= 29th Dáil =

TDs from 2002 to 2007

←	28th Dáil	30th Dáil	→

Overview
- Legislative body: Dáil Éireann
- Jurisdiction: Ireland
- Meeting place: Leinster House
- Term: 6 June 2002 – 26 April 2007
- Election: 2002 general election
- Government: 26th government of Ireland
- Members: 166
- Ceann Comhairle: Rory O'Hanlon
- Taoiseach: Bertie Ahern
- Tánaiste: Michael McDowell — Mary Harney until 13 September 2006
- Chief Whip: Tom Kitt — Mary Hanafin until 29 September 2004
- Leader of the Opposition: Enda Kenny

Sessions
- 1st: 6 June 2002 – 11 July 2002
- 2nd: 4 September 2002 – 12 July 2003
- 3rd: 30 September 2003 – 10 July 2004
- 4th: 29 September 2004 – 14 July 2005
- 5th: 28 September 2005 – 16 July 2006
- 6th: 27 September 2006 – 26 April 2007

The 29th Dáil was elected at the 2002 general election on 17 May 2002 and met on 6 June 2002. The members of Dáil Éireann, the house of representatives of the Oireachtas (legislature) of Ireland, are known as TDs. It sat with the 22nd Seanad as the two Houses of the Oireachtas.

The 29th Dáil was dissolved by President Mary McAleese on 26 April 2007, at the request of the Taoiseach Bertie Ahern. The 29th Dáil lasted 4 years, 324 days, the third longest after the 10th Dáil and the 28th Dáil.

== Composition of the 29th Dáil ==
- 26th government coalition parties

Party	June 2002	April 2007	Change
Fianna Fáil (Note: Niall Blaney joined Fianna Fáil, merging the Independent Fianna Fáil organisation into Fianna Fáil.)	81	78	▼3
Fine Gael	31	32	▲1
Labour	21	21	Steady
Progressive Democrats	8	8	Steady
Green	6	6	Steady
Sinn Féin	5	5	Steady
Socialist Party	1	1	Steady
Ind. Health Alliance	1	1	Steady
Independent Fianna Fáil	1	—N/a	▼1
Independent	11	13	▲2
Ceann Comhairle	—N/a	1	▲1
Total	166		

=== Graphical representation ===
This is a graphical comparison of party strengths in the 29th Dáil from June 2002. This was not the official seating plan.

== Ceann Comhairle ==
On 6 June 2002, Rory O'Hanlon (FF) was proposed by Bertie Ahern for the position of Ceann Comhairle. O'Hanlon was approved without a vote.

== List of TDs ==
This is a list of the 166 TDs elected to Dáil Éireann in the 2002 general election, sorted by party. The Changes table below records all changes in party affiliation during the 29th Dáil.

Party	Name	Constituency
Fianna Fáil (81)	Bertie Ahern	Dublin Central
Fianna Fáil (81)	Dermot Ahern	Louth
Fianna Fáil (81)	Michael Ahern	Cork East
Fianna Fáil (81)	Noel Ahern	Dublin North-West
Fianna Fáil (81)	Barry Andrews	Dún Laoghaire
Fianna Fáil (81)	Seán Ardagh	Dublin South-Central
Fianna Fáil (81)	Liam Aylward	Carlow–Kilkenny
Fianna Fáil (81)	Johnny Brady	Meath
Fianna Fáil (81)	Martin Brady	Dublin North-East
Fianna Fáil (81)	Séamus Brennan	Dublin South
Fianna Fáil (81)	John Browne	Wexford
Fianna Fáil (81)	Joe Callanan	Galway East
Fianna Fáil (81)	Ivor Callely	Dublin North-Central
Fianna Fáil (81)	Pat Carey	Dublin North-West
Fianna Fáil (81)	John Carty	Mayo
Fianna Fáil (81)	Donie Cassidy	Westmeath
Fianna Fáil (81)	Michael J. Collins	Limerick West
Fianna Fáil (81)	Mary Coughlan	Donegal South-West
Fianna Fáil (81)	Brian Cowen	Laois–Offaly
Fianna Fáil (81)	John Cregan	Limerick West
Fianna Fáil (81)	Martin Cullen	Waterford
Fianna Fáil (81)	John Curran	Dublin Mid-West
Fianna Fáil (81)	Noel Davern	Tipperary South
Fianna Fáil (81)	Síle de Valera	Clare
Fianna Fáil (81)	Noel Dempsey	Meath
Fianna Fáil (81)	Tony Dempsey	Wexford
Fianna Fáil (81)	John Dennehy	Cork South-Central
Fianna Fáil (81)	Jimmy Devins	Sligo–Leitrim
Fianna Fáil (81)	John Ellis	Sligo–Leitrim
Fianna Fáil (81)	Frank Fahey	Galway West
Fianna Fáil (81)	Michael Finneran	Longford–Roscommon
Fianna Fáil (81)	Dermot Fitzpatrick	Dublin Central
Fianna Fáil (81)	Seán Fleming	Laois–Offaly
Fianna Fáil (81)	Beverley Flynn	Mayo
Fianna Fáil (81)	Pat "the Cope" Gallagher	Donegal South-West
Fianna Fáil (81)	Jim Glennon	Dublin North
Fianna Fáil (81)	Mary Hanafin	Dún Laoghaire
Fianna Fáil (81)	Seán Haughey	Dublin North-Central
Fianna Fáil (81)	Máire Hoctor	Tipperary North
Fianna Fáil (81)	Joe Jacob	Wicklow
Fianna Fáil (81)	Cecilia Keaveney	Donegal North-East
Fianna Fáil (81)	Billy Kelleher	Cork North-Central
Fianna Fáil (81)	Peter Kelly	Longford–Roscommon
Fianna Fáil (81)	Tony Killeen	Clare
Fianna Fáil (81)	Séamus Kirk	Louth
Fianna Fáil (81)	Tom Kitt	Dublin South
Fianna Fáil (81)	Brian Lenihan	Dublin West
Fianna Fáil (81)	Conor Lenihan	Dublin South-West
Fianna Fáil (81)	Micheál Martin	Cork South-Central
Fianna Fáil (81)	Charlie McCreevy	Kildare North
Fianna Fáil (81)	Jim McDaid	Donegal North-East
Fianna Fáil (81)	Tom McEllistrim	Kerry North
Fianna Fáil (81)	John McGuinness	Carlow–Kilkenny
Fianna Fáil (81)	John Moloney	Laois–Offaly
Fianna Fáil (81)	Donal Moynihan	Cork North-West
Fianna Fáil (81)	Michael Moynihan	Cork North-West
Fianna Fáil (81)	Michael Mulcahy	Dublin South-Central
Fianna Fáil (81)	M. J. Nolan	Carlow–Kilkenny
Fianna Fáil (81)	Éamon Ó Cuív	Galway West
Fianna Fáil (81)	Charlie O'Connor	Dublin South-West
Fianna Fáil (81)	Willie O'Dea	Limerick East
Fianna Fáil (81)	John O'Donoghue	Kerry South
Fianna Fáil (81)	Denis O'Donovan	Cork South-West
Fianna Fáil (81)	Seán Ó Fearghaíl	Kildare South
Fianna Fáil (81)	Noel O'Flynn	Cork North-Central
Fianna Fáil (81)	Rory O'Hanlon	Cavan–Monaghan
Fianna Fáil (81)	Batt O'Keeffe	Cork South-Central
Fianna Fáil (81)	Ned O'Keeffe	Cork East
Fianna Fáil (81)	Peter Power	Limerick East
Fianna Fáil (81)	Seán Power	Kildare South
Fianna Fáil (81)	Dick Roche	Wicklow
Fianna Fáil (81)	Eoin Ryan	Dublin South-East
Fianna Fáil (81)	Brendan Smith	Cavan–Monaghan
Fianna Fáil (81)	Michael Smith	Tipperary North
Fianna Fáil (81)	Noel Treacy	Galway East
Fianna Fáil (81)	Dan Wallace	Cork North-Central
Fianna Fáil (81)	Mary Wallace	Meath
Fianna Fáil (81)	Joe Walsh	Cork South-West
Fianna Fáil (81)	Ollie Wilkinson	Waterford
Fianna Fáil (81)	Michael Woods	Dublin North-East
Fianna Fáil (81)	G. V. Wright	Dublin North
Fine Gael (31)	Bernard Allen	Cork North-Central
Fine Gael (31)	Pat Breen	Clare
Fine Gael (31)	John Bruton	Meath
Fine Gael (31)	Richard Bruton	Dublin North-Central
Fine Gael (31)	Paul Connaughton Snr	Galway East
Fine Gael (31)	Simon Coveney	Cork South-Central
Fine Gael (31)	Seymour Crawford	Cavan–Monaghan
Fine Gael (31)	John Deasy	Waterford
Fine Gael (31)	Jimmy Deenihan	Kerry North
Fine Gael (31)	Bernard Durkan	Kildare North
Fine Gael (31)	Damien English	Meath
Fine Gael (31)	Olwyn Enright	Laois–Offaly
Fine Gael (31)	Tom Hayes	Tipperary South
Fine Gael (31)	Phil Hogan	Carlow–Kilkenny
Fine Gael (31)	Paul Kehoe	Wexford
Fine Gael (31)	Enda Kenny	Mayo
Fine Gael (31)	Pádraic McCormack	Galway West
Fine Gael (31)	Dinny McGinley	Donegal South-West
Fine Gael (31)	Paul McGrath	Westmeath
Fine Gael (31)	Gay Mitchell	Dublin South-Central
Fine Gael (31)	Olivia Mitchell	Dublin South
Fine Gael (31)	Gerard Murphy	Cork North-West
Fine Gael (31)	Dan Neville	Limerick West
Fine Gael (31)	Denis Naughten	Longford–Roscommon
Fine Gael (31)	Michael Noonan	Limerick East
Fine Gael (31)	Fergus O'Dowd	Louth
Fine Gael (31)	Jim O'Keeffe	Cork South-West
Fine Gael (31)	John Perry	Sligo–Leitrim
Fine Gael (31)	Michael Ring	Mayo
Fine Gael (31)	David Stanton	Cork East
Fine Gael (31)	Billy Timmins	Wicklow
Labour Party (21)	Tommy Broughan	Dublin North-East
Labour Party (21)	Joan Burton	Dublin West
Labour Party (21)	Joe Costello	Dublin Central
Labour Party (21)	Breeda Moynihan-Cronin	Kerry South
Labour Party (21)	Eamon Gilmore	Dún Laoghaire
Labour Party (21)	Michael D. Higgins	Galway West
Labour Party (21)	Brendan Howlin	Wexford
Labour Party (21)	Kathleen Lynch	Cork North-Central
Labour Party (21)	Liz McManus	Wicklow
Labour Party (21)	Brian O'Shea	Waterford
Labour Party (21)	Jan O'Sullivan	Limerick East
Labour Party (21)	Séamus Pattison	Carlow–Kilkenny
Labour Party (21)	Willie Penrose	Westmeath
Labour Party (21)	Ruairi Quinn	Dublin South-East
Labour Party (21)	Pat Rabbitte	Dublin South-West
Labour Party (21)	Seán Ryan	Dublin North
Labour Party (21)	Joe Sherlock	Cork East
Labour Party (21)	Róisín Shortall	Dublin North-West
Labour Party (21)	Emmet Stagg	Kildare North
Labour Party (21)	Mary Upton	Dublin South-Central
Labour Party (21)	Jack Wall	Kildare South
Progressive Democrats (8)	Noel Grealish	Galway West
Progressive Democrats (8)	Mary Harney	Dublin Mid-West
Progressive Democrats (8)	Michael McDowell	Dublin South-East
Progressive Democrats (8)	Liz O'Donnell	Dublin South
Progressive Democrats (8)	Fiona O'Malley	Dún Laoghaire
Progressive Democrats (8)	Tim O'Malley	Limerick East
Progressive Democrats (8)	Tom Parlon	Laois–Offaly
Progressive Democrats (8)	Mae Sexton	Longford–Roscommon
Green Party (6)	Dan Boyle	Cork South-Central
Green Party (6)	Ciarán Cuffe	Dún Laoghaire
Green Party (6)	Paul Gogarty	Dublin Mid-West
Green Party (6)	John Gormley	Dublin South-East
Green Party (6)	Eamon Ryan	Dublin South
Green Party (6)	Trevor Sargent	Dublin North
Sinn Féin (5)	Seán Crowe	Dublin South-West
Sinn Féin (5)	Martin Ferris	Kerry North
Sinn Féin (5)	Arthur Morgan	Louth
Sinn Féin (5)	Caoimhghín Ó Caoláin	Cavan–Monaghan
Sinn Féin (5)	Aengus Ó Snodaigh	Dublin South-Central
Socialist Party (1)	Joe Higgins	Dublin West
Independent (13)	Niall Blaney	Donegal North-East
Independent (13)	James Breen	Clare
Independent (13)	Paudge Connolly	Cavan–Monaghan
Independent (13)	Jerry Cowley	Mayo
Independent (13)	Mildred Fox	Wicklow
Independent (13)	Tony Gregory	Dublin Central
Independent (13)	Marian Harkin	Sligo–Leitrim
Independent (13)	Séamus Healy	Tipperary South
Independent (13)	Michael Lowry	Tipperary North
Independent (13)	Finian McGrath	Dublin North-Central
Independent (13)	Paddy McHugh	Galway East
Independent (13)	Jackie Healy-Rae	Kerry South
Independent (13)	Liam Twomey	Wexford

== Changes ==
Date	Constituency	Loss	Gain	Note
6 June 2002	Cavan–Monaghan	Fianna Fáil	Ceann Comhairle	Rory O'Hanlon is elected Ceann Comhairle
27 September 2003	Limerick West	Fianna Fáil	Independent	Michael J. Collins resigns Fianna Fáil whip
5 May 2004	Mayo	Fianna Fáil	Independent	Beverley Flynn is expelled from Fianna Fáil
22 September 2004	Wexford	Independent	Fine Gael	Liam Twomey joins Fine Gael
31 October 2004	Kildare North	Fianna Fáil		Charlie McCreevy resigns his seat on appointment as European Commissioner
31 October 2004	Meath	Fine Gael		John Bruton resigns his seat on his appointment as EU Ambassador to the United States
11 March 2005	Meath		Fine Gael	Shane McEntee wins the seat vacated by John Bruton
11 March 2005	Kildare North		Independent	Catherine Murphy wins the seat vacated by Charlie McCreevy
26 July 2006	Donegal North-East	Independent Fianna Fáil	Fianna Fáil	Niall Blaney joins Fianna Fáil
