= 28th Dáil =

TDs from 1997 to 2002

←	27th Dáil	29th Dáil	→

Overview
- Legislative body: Dáil Éireann
- Jurisdiction: Ireland
- Meeting place: Leinster House
- Term: 26 June 1997 – 25 April 2002
- Election: 1997 general election
- Government: 25th government of Ireland
- Members: 166
- Ceann Comhairle: Séamus Pattison
- Taoiseach: Bertie Ahern
- Tánaiste: Mary Harney
- Chief Whip: Séamus Brennan
- Leader of the Opposition: Michael Noonan — John Bruton until 9 February 2001

Sessions
- 1st: 26 June 1997 – 10 July 1997
- 2nd: 10 September 1997 – 3 July 1998
- 3rd: 2 September 1998 – 2 July 1999
- 4th: 29 September 1999 – 30 June 2000
- 5th: 3 October 2000 – 6 July 2001
- 6th: 18 September 2001 – 25 April 2002

The 28th Dáil was elected at the 1997 general election on 6 June 1997 and met on 26 June 1997. The members of Dáil Éireann, the house of representatives of the Oireachtas (legislature) of Ireland, are known as TDs. It sat with the 21st Seanad as the two Houses of the Oireachtas.

The 28th Dáil was dissolved by President Mary McAleese on 25 April 2002, at the request of the Taoiseach, Bertie Ahern. The 28th Dáil lasted 4 years, 303 days, the second longest after the 10th Dáil.

== Composition of the 28th Dáil ==
- 25th government coalition parties

Party	June 1997	Apr. 2002	Change
Fianna Fáil	77	73	▼4
Fine Gael	54	54	Steady
Labour (Note: Democratic Left merged into Labour in January 1999.)	17	20	▲3
Progressive Democrats	4	4	Steady
Democratic Left	4	—N/a	▼4
Green	2	2	Steady
Sinn Féin	1	1	Steady
Socialist Party	1	1	Steady
Independent Fianna Fáil	1	1	Steady
Independent	5	9	▲4
Ceann Comhairle	—N/a	1	▲1
Total	166		

=== Graphical representation ===
This is a graphical comparison of party strengths in the 28th Dáil from June 1997. This was not the official seating plan.

== Ceann Comhairle ==
On 26 June 1997, Séamus Pattison (Lab) was proposed by Dick Spring and seconded by Mary O'Rourke for the position of Ceann Comhairle. Pattison was approved without a vote.

== List of TDs ==
This is a list of TDs elected to Dáil Éireann in the 1997 general election, arranged by party. This table is a record of the 1997 general election results. The Changes table below records all changes in membership and party affiliation.

Party	Name	Constituency
Fianna Fáil (77)	Bertie Ahern	Dublin Central
Fianna Fáil (77)	Dermot Ahern	Louth
Fianna Fáil (77)	Noel Ahern	Dublin North-West
Fianna Fáil (77)	Michael Ahern	Cork East
Fianna Fáil (77)	David Andrews	Dún Laoghaire
Fianna Fáil (77)	Seán Ardagh	Dublin South-Central
Fianna Fáil (77)	Liam Aylward	Carlow–Kilkenny
Fianna Fáil (77)	Johnny Brady	Meath
Fianna Fáil (77)	Martin Brady	Dublin North-East
Fianna Fáil (77)	Matt Brennan	Sligo–Leitrim
Fianna Fáil (77)	Séamus Brennan	Dublin South
Fianna Fáil (77)	Ben Briscoe	Dublin South-Central
Fianna Fáil (77)	John Browne	Wexford
Fianna Fáil (77)	Ray Burke	Dublin North
Fianna Fáil (77)	Hugh Byrne	Wexford
Fianna Fáil (77)	Ivor Callely	Dublin North-Central
Fianna Fáil (77)	Pat Carey	Dublin North-West
Fianna Fáil (77)	Michael J. Collins	Limerick West
Fianna Fáil (77)	Mary Coughlan	Donegal South-West
Fianna Fáil (77)	Brian Cowen	Laois–Offaly
Fianna Fáil (77)	Martin Cullen	Waterford
Fianna Fáil (77)	Brendan Daly	Clare
Fianna Fáil (77)	Noel Davern	Tipperary South
Fianna Fáil (77)	Noel Dempsey	Meath
Fianna Fáil (77)	John Dennehy	Cork South-Central
Fianna Fáil (77)	Síle de Valera	Clare
Fianna Fáil (77)	Seán Doherty	Longford–Roscommon
Fianna Fáil (77)	John Ellis	Sligo–Leitrim
Fianna Fáil (77)	Frank Fahey	Galway West
Fianna Fáil (77)	Seán Fleming	Laois–Offaly
Fianna Fáil (77)	Chris Flood	Dublin South-West
Fianna Fáil (77)	Beverley Flynn	Mayo
Fianna Fáil (77)	Denis Foley	Kerry North
Fianna Fáil (77)	Mary Hanafin	Dún Laoghaire
Fianna Fáil (77)	Seán Haughey	Dublin North-Central
Fianna Fáil (77)	Joe Jacob	Wicklow
Fianna Fáil (77)	Cecilia Keaveney	Donegal North-East
Fianna Fáil (77)	Brendan Kenneally	Waterford
Fianna Fáil (77)	Billy Kelleher	Cork North-Central
Fianna Fáil (77)	Tony Killeen	Clare
Fianna Fáil (77)	Séamus Kirk	Louth
Fianna Fáil (77)	Michael P. Kitt	Galway East
Fianna Fáil (77)	Tom Kitt	Dublin South
Fianna Fáil (77)	Liam Lawlor	Dublin West
Fianna Fáil (77)	Brian Lenihan	Dublin West
Fianna Fáil (77)	Conor Lenihan	Dublin South-West
Fianna Fáil (77)	Micheál Martin	Cork South-Central
Fianna Fáil (77)	Charlie McCreevy	Kildare North
Fianna Fáil (77)	Jim McDaid	Donegal North-East
Fianna Fáil (77)	Marian McGennis	Dublin Central
Fianna Fáil (77)	John McGuinness	Carlow–Kilkenny
Fianna Fáil (77)	Tom Moffatt	Mayo
Fianna Fáil (77)	John Moloney	Laois–Offaly
Fianna Fáil (77)	Donal Moynihan	Cork North-West
Fianna Fáil (77)	Michael Moynihan	Cork North-West
Fianna Fáil (77)	Éamon Ó Cuív	Galway West
Fianna Fáil (77)	Willie O'Dea	Limerick East
Fianna Fáil (77)	John O'Donoghue	Kerry South
Fianna Fáil (77)	Noel O'Flynn	Cork North-Central
Fianna Fáil (77)	Rory O'Hanlon	Cavan–Monaghan
Fianna Fáil (77)	Batt O'Keeffe	Cork South-Central
Fianna Fáil (77)	Ned O'Keeffe	Cork East
Fianna Fáil (77)	Michael O'Kennedy	Tipperary North
Fianna Fáil (77)	Mary O'Rourke	Westmeath
Fianna Fáil (77)	Seán Power	Kildare South
Fianna Fáil (77)	Albert Reynolds	Longford–Roscommon
Fianna Fáil (77)	Dick Roche	Wicklow
Fianna Fáil (77)	Eoin Ryan	Dublin South-East
Fianna Fáil (77)	Brendan Smith	Cavan–Monaghan
Fianna Fáil (77)	Michael Smith	Tipperary North
Fianna Fáil (77)	Noel Treacy	Galway East
Fianna Fáil (77)	Eddie Wade	Limerick East
Fianna Fáil (77)	Dan Wallace	Cork North-Central
Fianna Fáil (77)	Mary Wallace	Meath
Fianna Fáil (77)	Joe Walsh	Cork South-West
Fianna Fáil (77)	G. V. Wright	Dublin North
Fianna Fáil (77)	Michael Woods	Dublin North-East
Fine Gael (54)	Theresa Ahearn	Tipperary South
Fine Gael (54)	Bernard Allen	Cork North-Central
Fine Gael (54)	Seán Barrett	Dún Laoghaire
Fine Gael (54)	Monica Barnes	Dún Laoghaire
Fine Gael (54)	Louis Belton	Longford–Roscommon
Fine Gael (54)	Paul Bradford	Cork East
Fine Gael (54)	John Browne	Carlow–Kilkenny
Fine Gael (54)	John Bruton	Meath
Fine Gael (54)	Richard Bruton	Dublin North-Central
Fine Gael (54)	Andrew Boylan	Cavan–Monaghan
Fine Gael (54)	Liam Burke	Cork North-Central
Fine Gael (54)	Ulick Burke	Galway East
Fine Gael (54)	Donal Carey	Clare
Fine Gael (54)	Deirdre Clune	Cork South-Central
Fine Gael (54)	Paul Connaughton Snr	Galway East
Fine Gael (54)	Michael Joe Cosgrave	Dublin North-East
Fine Gael (54)	Hugh Coveney	Cork South-Central
Fine Gael (54)	Seymour Crawford	Cavan–Monaghan
Fine Gael (54)	Michael Creed	Cork North-West
Fine Gael (54)	Austin Currie	Dublin West
Fine Gael (54)	Michael D'Arcy	Wexford
Fine Gael (54)	Austin Deasy	Waterford
Fine Gael (54)	Jimmy Deenihan	Kerry North
Fine Gael (54)	Alan Dukes	Kildare South
Fine Gael (54)	Bernard Durkan	Kildare North
Fine Gael (54)	Tom Enright	Laois–Offaly
Fine Gael (54)	John Farrelly	Meath
Fine Gael (54)	Michael Finucane	Limerick West
Fine Gael (54)	Frances Fitzgerald	Dublin South-East
Fine Gael (54)	Charles Flanagan	Laois–Offaly
Fine Gael (54)	Brian Hayes	Dublin South-West
Fine Gael (54)	Jim Higgins	Mayo
Fine Gael (54)	Phil Hogan	Carlow–Kilkenny
Fine Gael (54)	Enda Kenny	Mayo
Fine Gael (54)	Gay Mitchell	Dublin South-Central
Fine Gael (54)	Jim Mitchell	Dublin Central
Fine Gael (54)	Olivia Mitchell	Dublin South
Fine Gael (54)	Brendan McGahon	Louth
Fine Gael (54)	Dinny McGinley	Donegal South-West
Fine Gael (54)	Paul McGrath	Westmeath
Fine Gael (54)	Pádraic McCormack	Galway West
Fine Gael (54)	Denis Naughten	Longford–Roscommon
Fine Gael (54)	Dan Neville	Limerick West
Fine Gael (54)	Michael Noonan	Limerick East
Fine Gael (54)	Jim O'Keeffe	Cork South-West
Fine Gael (54)	Nora Owen	Dublin North
Fine Gael (54)	John Perry	Sligo–Leitrim
Fine Gael (54)	Gerry Reynolds	Sligo–Leitrim
Fine Gael (54)	Michael Ring	Mayo
Fine Gael (54)	Alan Shatter	Dublin South
Fine Gael (54)	P. J. Sheehan	Cork South-West
Fine Gael (54)	David Stanton	Cork East
Fine Gael (54)	Billy Timmins	Wicklow
Fine Gael (54)	Ivan Yates	Wexford
Labour Party (17)	Michael Bell	Louth
Labour Party (17)	Tommy Broughan	Dublin North-East
Labour Party (17)	Michael Ferris	Tipperary South
Labour Party (17)	Michael D. Higgins	Galway West
Labour Party (17)	Brendan Howlin	Wexford
Labour Party (17)	Jim Kemmy	Limerick East
Labour Party (17)	Derek McDowell	Dublin North-Central
Labour Party (17)	Breeda Moynihan-Cronin	Kerry South
Labour Party (17)	Brian O'Shea	Waterford
Labour Party (17)	Séamus Pattison	Carlow–Kilkenny
Labour Party (17)	Willie Penrose	Westmeath
Labour Party (17)	Ruairi Quinn	Dublin South-East
Labour Party (17)	Róisín Shortall	Dublin North-West
Labour Party (17)	Dick Spring	Kerry North
Labour Party (17)	Emmet Stagg	Kildare North
Labour Party (17)	Pat Upton	Dublin South-Central
Labour Party (17)	Jack Wall	Kildare South
Democratic Left (4)	Proinsias De Rossa	Dublin North-West
Democratic Left (4)	Eamon Gilmore	Dún Laoghaire
Democratic Left (4)	Liz McManus	Wicklow
Democratic Left (4)	Pat Rabbitte	Dublin South-West
Progressive Democrats (4)	Mary Harney	Dublin South-West
Progressive Democrats (4)	Bobby Molloy	Galway West
Progressive Democrats (4)	Liz O'Donnell	Dublin South
Progressive Democrats (4)	Desmond O'Malley	Limerick East
Green Party (2)	John Gormley	Dublin South-East
Green Party (2)	Trevor Sargent	Dublin North
Independent Fianna Fáil (1)	Harry Blaney	Donegal North-East
Sinn Féin (1)	Caoimhghín Ó Caoláin	Cavan–Monaghan
Socialist Party (1)	Joe Higgins	Dublin West
Independent (5)	Mildred Fox	Wicklow
Independent (5)	Tom Gildea	Donegal South-West
Independent (5)	Tony Gregory	Dublin Central
Independent (5)	Jackie Healy-Rae	Kerry South
Independent (5)	Michael Lowry	Tipperary North

== Changes ==
Date	Constituency	Loss	Gain	Note
26 June 1997	Carlow–Kilkenny	Labour	Ceann Comhairle	Séamus Pattison takes office as Ceann Comhairle
25 September 1997	Limerick East	Labour		Death of Jim Kemmy
20 October 1997	Dublin North	Fianna Fáil		Ray Burke resigns from Dáil Éireann
11 March 1998	Limerick East		Labour	Jan O'Sullivan holds the seat vacated by the death of Jim Kemmy
11 March 1998	Dublin North		Labour	Seán Ryan takes the seat vacated by Ray Burke
14 March 1998	Cork South-Central	Fine Gael		Death of Hugh Coveney
13 October 1998	Louth	Labour	Independent	Michael Bell resigns from the Labour Party
23 October 1998	Cork South-Central		Fine Gael	Simon Coveney holds the seat vacated by the death of his father Hugh Coveney
30 November 1998	Louth	Independent	Labour	Michael Bell rejoins the Labour Party
24 January 1999	Dublin North-West	Democratic Left	Labour	Proinsias De Rossa joins the Labour Party in a merger with Democratic Left
24 January 1999	Dublin South-West	Democratic Left	Labour	Pat Rabbitte joins the Labour Party in a merger with Democratic Left
24 January 1999	Dún Laoghaire	Democratic Left	Labour	Eamon Gilmore joins the Labour Party in a merger with Democratic Left
24 January 1999	Wicklow	Democratic Left	Labour	Liz McManus joins the Labour Party in a merger with Democratic Left
22 February 1999	Dublin South-Central	Labour		Death of Pat Upton
24 February 1999	Mayo	Fianna Fáil	Independent	Beverley Flynn resigns from Fianna Fáil
27 October 1999	Dublin South-Central		Labour	Mary Upton holds the seat vacated by the death of her brother Pat Upton
3 November 1999	Mayo	Independent	Fianna Fáil	Beverley Flynn rejoins Fianna Fáil
9 February 2000	Kerry North	Fianna Fáil	Independent	Denis Foley resigns from Fianna Fáil
20 March 2000	Tipperary South	Labour		Death of Michael Ferris
7 June 2000	Dublin West	Fianna Fáil	Independent	Liam Lawlor resigns from Fianna Fáil
22 June 2000	Tipperary South		Independent	Séamus Healy takes the seat vacated by the death of Michael Ferris
20 September 2000	Tipperary South	Fine Gael		Death of Theresa Ahearn
11 April 2001	Mayo	Fianna Fáil	Independent	Beverley Flynn is expelled from Fianna Fáil
1 July 2001	Tipperary South		Fine Gael	Tom Hayes (FG) holds the seat vacated by the death of Theresa Ahearn
