= Tom Foxe =

Irish politician (1937–2000)

Teachta Dála
- In office November 1992 – June 1997
- Constituency: Longford–Roscommon
- In office June 1989 – November 1992
- Constituency: Roscommon

Personal details
- Born: 1 June 1937 County Roscommon, Ireland
- Died: 8 February 2000 (aged 62) County Roscommon, Ireland
- Party: Independent

Thomas Foxe (1 June 1937 – 8 February 2000) was an Irish independent politician

He was from Roscommon and owned Tom Foxe's Bar in the town.

Foxe was elected to Dáil Éireann as an independent Teachta Dála (TD) on his first attempt, at the 1989 general election in the Roscommon constituency. He unseated the sitting Fianna Fáil TD and former minister Seán Doherty.

He was re-elected at the 1992 general election, for the new constituency of Longford–Roscommon, but lost his seat at the 1997 general election.

At the 1991 local elections, he was elected to Roscommon County Council for Roscommon town, and served until his death on 8 February 2000.

Dáil	Election	Deputy (Party)	Deputy (Party)	Deputy (Party)	Deputy (Party)
4th	1923	George Noble Plunkett (Rep)	Henry Finlay (CnaG)	Gerald Boland (Rep)	Andrew Lavin (CnaG)
4th	1925 by-election	George Noble Plunkett (Rep)	Martin Conlon (CnaG)	Gerald Boland (Rep)	Andrew Lavin (CnaG)
5th	1927 (Jun)	Patrick O'Dowd (FF)	Martin Conlon (CnaG)	Gerald Boland (FF)	Michael Brennan (Ind.)
6th	1927 (Sep)	Patrick O'Dowd (FF)	Martin Conlon (CnaG)	Gerald Boland (FF)	Michael Brennan (Ind.)
7th	1932	Daniel O'Rourke (FF)	Martin Conlon (CnaG)	Gerald Boland (FF)	Frank MacDermot (NCP)
8th	1933	Patrick O'Dowd (FF)	Michael Brennan (CnaG)	Gerald Boland (FF)	Frank MacDermot (NCP)
9th	1937	Michael Brennan (FG)	Daniel O'Rourke (FF)	Gerald Boland (FF)	3 seats 1937–1948
10th	1938	Michael Brennan (FG)	Daniel O'Rourke (FF)	Gerald Boland (FF)	3 seats 1937–1948
11th	1943	John Meighan (CnaT)	John Beirne (CnaT)	Gerald Boland (FF)	3 seats 1937–1948
12th	1944	Daniel O'Rourke (FF)	John Beirne (CnaT)	Gerald Boland (FF)	3 seats 1937–1948
13th	1948	Daniel O'Rourke (FF)	John Beirne (CnaT)	Gerald Boland (FF)	Jack McQuillan (CnaP)
14th	1951	John Finan (CnaT)	John Beirne (CnaT)	Gerald Boland (FF)	Jack McQuillan (Ind.)
15th	1954	James Burke (FG)	John Beirne (CnaT)	Gerald Boland (FF)	Jack McQuillan (Ind.)
16th	1957	James Burke (FG)	John Beirne (CnaT)	Gerald Boland (FF)	Jack McQuillan (Ind.)
17th	1961	James Burke (FG)	Patrick J. Reynolds (FG)	Brian Lenihan Snr (FF)	Jack McQuillan (NPD)
17th	1964 by-election	Joan Burke (FG)	Patrick J. Reynolds (FG)	Brian Lenihan Snr (FF)	Jack McQuillan (NPD)
18th	1965	Joan Burke (FG)	Patrick J. Reynolds (FG)	Brian Lenihan Snr (FF)	Hugh Gibbons (FF)
19th	1969	Constituency abolished. See Roscommon–Leitrim			

Dáil	Election	Deputy (Party)	Deputy (Party)	Deputy (Party)
22nd	1981	Terry Leyden (FF)	Seán Doherty (FF)	John Connor (FG)
23rd	1982 (Feb)	Terry Leyden (FF)	Seán Doherty (FF)	Liam Naughten (FG)
24th	1982 (Nov)	Terry Leyden (FF)	Seán Doherty (FF)	Liam Naughten (FG)
25th	1987	Terry Leyden (FF)	Seán Doherty (FF)	Liam Naughten (FG)
26th	1989	Terry Leyden (FF)	Tom Foxe (Ind.)	John Connor (FG)
27th	1992	Constituency abolished. See Longford–Roscommon		

Dáil	Election	Deputy (Party)	Deputy (Party)	Deputy (Party)	Deputy (Party)
27th	1992	Albert Reynolds (FF)	Seán Doherty (FF)	Tom Foxe (Ind.)	John Connor (FG)
28th	1997	Albert Reynolds (FF)	Seán Doherty (FF)	Louis Belton (FG)	Denis Naughten (FG)
29th	2002	Peter Kelly (FF)	Michael Finneran (FF)	Mae Sexton (PDs)	Denis Naughten (FG)
30th	2007	Constituency abolished. See Longford–Westmeath and Roscommon–South Leitrim			
