= Mae Sexton =

Irish former politician (born 1955)

Teachta Dála
- In office May 2002 – May 2007
- Constituency: Longford–Roscommon

Personal details
- Born: 28 April 1955 (age 70) County Longford, Ireland
- Party: Independent (1991–1997, 2009, since 2012)
- Other political affiliations: Progressive Democrats (1997–2009); Labour Party (2010–2012)

Mae Sexton (born 28 April 1955) is an Irish former independent politician. She was previously a Progressive Democrats Teachta Dála (TD) for the Longford–Roscommon constituency from 2002 to 2007.

== Background ==
She is a native of the townland of Glack, near Longford town.

== Political career ==
Mae Sexton first became active in elected politics in 1991, when she stood as an independent candidate for Longford Town Council and Longford County Council and was elected to both bodies, receiving the largest number of votes in each case. She stood at the 1992 general election in Longford–Roscommon as an independent candidate, but obtained only 1,160 first preference votes (2.6%), and was eliminated, failing to be elected.

Prior to the 1997 general election, she joined the Progressive Democrats, and stood in the Longford–Roscommon constituency for the party, obtaining 2,289 first preference votes (4.8%), and being eliminated on the second count.

She was re-elected to both Longford Urban District and County Councils in the 1999 local elections, although her first preference vote for both bodies had declined.

She stood again at the 2002 general election. Her first preference vote increased to 4,679 (9.4%), and she was elected to Dáil Éireann, finishing 54 votes ahead of a Fianna Fáil candidate for the final seat, having edged out the sitting Fine Gael TD, Louis Belton, by just over 200 votes at an earlier stage in the count. Her election in 2002, in a predominantly rural midland constituency for a party often associated with the urban middle classes was one of the major surprises of that election, and came after a series of near misses from elimination during the progress of the election count.

=== Dáil Éireann ===
Sexton maintained an active profile within County Longford during her time as a Dáil deputy and built a minor profile nationally as a panellist on political discussion programmes on radio and television. In June 2005, she attracted attention by calling for the Irish government to abandon plans for a referendum on the European Constitution after the defeats of the referendums in France and the Netherlands.

=== 2007 general election ===
Her political future was affected by changes in constituency boundaries which came into force at the 2007 general election. County Longford was included in a new Longford–Westmeath constituency. At the local elections in 2004, in which Sexton was not allowed to stand because of legislation forbidding TDs and Senators to serve on local councils, her personal vote largely failed to transfer to her local party colleagues, with her former County Council seat being lost and only the Longford Town Council seat being held by the party.

At the 2007 general election she lost her seat, polling only 2,298 first preference votes (4.2%) in the new constituency and being eliminated on the third count. Unofficial tally figures published in local newspapers showed that her vote had halved in her County Longford base, while she received negligible support in County Westmeath. After the poor performance of the PDs in the election, she said in an interview with local radio that she was still committed to the party.

=== 2009 local elections ===
With the dissolution of the Progressive Democrats in 2009, Sexton stood as an independent candidate at the 2009 local elections in Longford. She regained her seats on both the Longford County and Town Councils.

=== Labour Party (2010–2012) ===
In April 2010, the Labour Party announced that Sexton had accepted an invitation to join the party. Sexton ran in the 2011 general election in Longford–Westmeath alongside sitting Labour TD Willie Penrose. She was unsuccessful garnering 3,960 votes or 6.8% of the poll. She left the Labour Party in December 2012, citing concerns over the budget.

=== 2014–2019 ===
She was re-elected to Longford County Council at the 2014 local elections. She was an unsuccessful independent candidate at the 2016 general election for the Longford–Westmeath constituency. She lost her seat on Longford County Council at the 2019 local elections.

Dáil	Election	Deputy (Party)	Deputy (Party)	Deputy (Party)	Deputy (Party)
27th	1992	Albert Reynolds (FF)	Seán Doherty (FF)	Tom Foxe (Ind.)	John Connor (FG)
28th	1997	Albert Reynolds (FF)	Seán Doherty (FF)	Louis Belton (FG)	Denis Naughten (FG)
29th	2002	Peter Kelly (FF)	Michael Finneran (FF)	Mae Sexton (PDs)	Denis Naughten (FG)
30th	2007	Constituency abolished. See Longford–Westmeath and Roscommon–South Leitrim			
