= Longford–Roscommon =

Dáil constituency (1992–2007)

- Former Dáil constituency

Former constituency
- Created: 1992
- Abolished: 2007
- Seats: 4
- Local government areas: County Longford; County Roscommon
- Created from: Longford–Westmeath; Roscommon
- Replaced by: Longford–Westmeath; Roscommon–South Leitrim

Longford–Roscommon was a parliamentary constituency represented in Dáil Éireann, the lower house of the Irish parliament or Oireachtas from 1992 to 2007. The constituency was served by 4 deputies (Teachtaí Dála, commonly known as TDs). The method of election was proportional representation by means of the single transferable vote (PR-STV).

== History and boundaries ==
The Longford–Roscommon constituency was created under the Electoral (Amendment) Act 1990 and first used at the 1992 general election. The constituency was previously represented through the constituencies of Roscommon and Longford–Westmeath, both of which were abolished in 1992.

The constituency spanned the entire area of County Longford and County Roscommon, taking in the towns of Longford and Roscommon and many other areas.

It was one of a number of constituencies which were altered by the Electoral (Amendment) Act 2005; with effect from the 2007 general election, the Longford–Roscommon constituency was abolished. Longford joined the recreated constituency of Longford–Westmeath, while Roscommon became part of Roscommon–South Leitrim.

== TDs ==
Teachtaí Dála (TDs) for Longford–Roscommon 1992–2007
Key to parties: FF = Fianna Fáil; FG = Fine Gael; Ind = Independent; PDs = Progressive Democrats
Dáil	Election	Deputy (Party)	Deputy (Party)	Deputy (Party)	Deputy (Party)
27th	1992	Albert Reynolds (FF)	Seán Doherty (FF)	Tom Foxe (Ind)	John Connor (FG)
28th	1997	Albert Reynolds (FF)	Seán Doherty (FF)	Louis Belton (FG)	Denis Naughten (FG)
29th	2002	Peter Kelly (FF)	Michael Finneran (FF)	Mae Sexton (PDs)	Denis Naughten (FG)
30th	2007	Constituency abolished. See Longford–Westmeath and Roscommon–South Leitrim			

Note: The columns in this table are used only for presentational purposes, and no significance should be attached to the order of columns. For details of the order in which seats were won at each election, see the detailed results of that election.

== Elections ==
*: Outgoing TD

=== 2002 general election ===
2002 general election: Longford–Roscommon
Party	Candidate	FPv%	Count									
Party	Candidate	FPv%	1	2	3	4	5	6	7	8	9	10
Fianna Fáil	Peter Kelly	14.7	7,319	7,323	7,334	7,407	7,634	7,872	7,905	7,980	8,005	9,318
Fine Gael	Denis Naughten	13.4	6,660	6,686	6,722	6,921	7,076	7,431	9,506	11,614		
Fianna Fáil	Michael Finneran	13.1	6,502	6,521	6,537	6,612	6,730	7,158	7,294	8,181	8,725	8,916
Fianna Fáil	Greg Kelly	12.9	6,430	6,471	6,490	6,670	6,897	7,014	7,740	8,459	8,687	8,862
Fine Gael	Louis Belton	9.6	4,762	4,767	4,788	4,921	5,037	5,193	5,705	5,832	6,215	
Progressive Democrats	Mae Sexton	9.4	4,679	4,699	4,751	4,905	5,198	5,497	5,558	6,071	6,301	8,917
Fine Gael	John Connor	7.7	3,829	3,880	3,899	4,042	4,150	4,289				
Independent	Úna Quinn	7.2	3,598	3,650	3,738	4,000	4,331	4,859	5,365			
Independent	Tom Crosby	4.3	2,123	2,133	2,144	2,251	2,422					
Sinn Féin	Paul Whelan	3.4	1,673	1,686	1,702	1,872						
Independent	Luke 'Ming' Flanagan	1.6	779	790	840							
Labour	Hughie Baxter	1.3	638	640	724							
Green	Catherine Ansboro	0.9	426	435								
Independent	Vincent Killalea	0.4	191									
Christian Solidarity	Brian Lenehan	0.2	80									
Electorate: 70,650 Valid: 49,689 Spoilt: 621 (1.2%) Quota: 9,938 Turnout: 50,310 (71.2%)

=== 1997 general election ===
1997 general election: Longford–Roscommon
Party	Candidate	FPv%	Count							
Party	Candidate	FPv%	1	2	3	4	5	6	7	8
Fianna Fáil	Albert Reynolds	18.5	8,742	8,793	9,847					
Fine Gael	Denis Naughten	14.1	6,652	6,801	6,917	7,291	9,040	9,058	12,868	
Fianna Fáil	Sean Doherty	12.2	5,768	6,050	6,191	7,446	8,526	8,643	9,693	
Fine Gael	Louis Belton	12.1	5,696	5,800	6,299	6,356	6,514	6,699	7,315	9,632
Fine Gael	John Connor	10.8	5,104	5,342	5,388	5,559	6,210	6,213		
Fianna Fáil	Michael Finneran	9.3	4,414	4,457	4,545	5,523	6,360	6,427	6,654	6,988
Independent	Tom Foxe	8.6	4,082	4,280	4,465	5,000				
Fianna Fáil	Terry Leyden	7.0	3,308	3,382	3,513					
Progressive Democrats	Mae Sexton	4.8	2,289	2,346						
Labour	Marian Gaffney	1.5	699							
Independent	Brian Sheerin	1.1	526							
Electorate: 63,942 Valid: 47,280 Spoilt: 563 (1.2%) Quota: 9,457 Turnout: 47,843 (74.8%)

=== 1992 general election ===
1992 general election: Longford–Roscommon
Party	Candidate	FPv%	Count								
Party	Candidate	FPv%	1	2	3	4	5	6	7	8	9
Fianna Fáil	Albert Reynolds	22.8	10,307								
Fianna Fáil	Seán Doherty	12.8	5,788	6,124	6,147	6,247	6,335	7,130	7,510	7,799	7,994
Independent	Tom Foxe	12.3	5,585	5,621	5,657	5,951	6,365	6,765	7,869	8,609	9,730
Fine Gael	John Connor	11.4	5,154	5,160	5,173	5,316	5,343	5,383	6,995	10,809	
Fine Gael	Louis Belton	10.5	4,769	4,974	4,992	5,091	5,667	5,691	6,396		
Fianna Fáil	Terry Leyden	9.6	4,331	4,732	4,752	4,838	4,962	6,016	6,578	6,931	7,132
Fine Gael	Liam Naughten	8.0	3,633	3,642	3,651	3,759	3,784	4,815			
Fianna Fáil	Michael Finneran	7.2	3,261	3,378	3,385	3,421	3,464				
Independent	Mae Sexton	2.6	1,160	1,279	1,325	1,500					
Labour	Jim Nolan	1.3	595	600	655						
Independent	Martin Hogan	1.0	459	462	473						
Sinn Féin	Tena O'Leary	0.4	160	165							
Green	Peter Sweetman	0.2	103	106							
Electorate: 60,709 Valid: 45,305 Spoilt: 501 (1.1%) Quota: 9,062 Turnout: 45,806 (75.5%)

== See also ==
- Dáil constituencies
- Politics of the Republic of Ireland
- Historic Dáil constituencies
- Elections in the Republic of Ireland
