= Paul McGrath (politician) =

Irish former politician (born 1948)

Teachta Dála
- In office November 1992 – May 2007
- Constituency: Westmeath
- In office June 1989 – November 1992
- Constituency: Longford–Westmeath

Personal details
- Born: 13 February 1948 (age 78)
- Party: Fine Gael
- Education: Leeds Trinity and All Saints College

Paul McGrath (born 13 February 1948) is an Irish former Fine Gael politician. He was a Teachta Dála (TD) for Longford–Westmeath and Westmeath constituencies from 1989 to 2007.

McGrath, a native of Ballymore, County Westmeath was educated at St Finian's College, Mullingar and at Leeds Trinity and All Saints College. Prior to entering national politics, he worked as a primary schoolteacher in County Westmeath.

McGrath was elected to Dáil Éireann at the 1989 general election as a Fine Gael candidate in the Longford–Westmeath constituency, replacing the retiring Fine Gael TD, Patrick Cooney. He retained his seat in all subsequent elections, which since the 1992 general election has been part of the Westmeath constituency. In 1991, he was elected as a member of Westmeath County Council and Mullingar Town Council, and was a member of both bodies until his retirement from local politics in 2002.

In Dáil Éireann, he served as Fine Gael spokesperson on Public Works from 1993 to 1994 and as front bench spokesperson on Education in 1994, while Fine Gael were in opposition. During Fine Gael's period in government between 1995 and 1997, he was not appointed as a senior or junior minister, but was chairperson of the Joint Oireachtas Committee on the Family between 1995 and 1997.

In 1993 McGrath spoke against the decriminalisation of homosexuality. In the debate he remarked that "if this Bill is passed, I am concerned about the possible effect on Irish society. Will we now see exhibitions in public by homosexuals holding hands, kissing, cuddling, etc? Is homosexual behaviour to be put on a par with heterosexual behaviour?".

In the 29th Dáil elected in 2002, he was a member of the Joint Oireachtas Committee on Finance and the Committee on the Houses of the Oireachtas, as well as being Fine Gael's deputy spokesperson on Finance.

In 2005, his Westmeath constituency was re-constituted into the new Longford–Westmeath constituency. In an unexpected move, McGrath retired at the 2007 general election. Among the reasons cited were his age, his dissatisfaction with Fine Gael's proposed candidate selection strategy in the new constituency, and that he felt it unlikely that he would be chosen as a minister if Fine Gael were returned to government.

Dáil	Election	Deputy (Party)	Deputy (Party)	Deputy (Party)	Deputy (Party)	Deputy (Party)
2nd	1921	Lorcan Robbins (SF)	Seán Mac Eoin (SF)	Joseph McGuinness (SF)	Laurence Ginnell (SF)	4 seats 1921–1923
3rd	1922	John Lyons (Lab)	Seán Mac Eoin (PT-SF)	Francis McGuinness (PT-SF)	Laurence Ginnell (AT-SF)	4 seats 1921–1923
4th	1923	John Lyons (Ind.)	Conor Byrne (Rep)	James Killane (Rep)	Patrick Shaw (CnaG)	Patrick McKenna (FP)
5th	1927 (Jun)	Henry Broderick (Lab)	Michael Kennedy (FF)	James Victory (FF)	Patrick Shaw (CnaG)	Hugh Garahan (FP)
6th	1927 (Sep)	Henry Broderick (Lab)	Michael Kennedy (FF)	James Killane (FF)	Patrick Shaw (CnaG)	Michael Connolly (CnaG)
6th	1930 by-election	Henry Broderick (Lab)	Michael Kennedy (FF)	James Geoghegan (FF)	Patrick Shaw (CnaG)	Michael Connolly (CnaG)
7th	1932	Francis Gormley (FF)	Michael Kennedy (FF)	James Geoghegan (FF)	Patrick Shaw (CnaG)	Seán Mac Eoin (CnaG)
8th	1933	James Victory (FF)	Michael Kennedy (FF)	James Geoghegan (FF)	Charles Fagan (NCP)	Seán Mac Eoin (CnaG)
9th	1937	Constituency abolished. See Athlone–Longford and Meath–Westmeath				

Dáil	Election	Deputy (Party)	Deputy (Party)	Deputy (Party)	Deputy (Party)	Deputy (Party)
13th	1948	Erskine H. Childers (FF)	Thomas Carter (FF)	Michael Kennedy (FF)	Seán Mac Eoin (FG)	Charles Fagan (Ind.)
14th	1951	Erskine H. Childers (FF)	Frank Carter (FF)	Michael Kennedy (FF)	Seán Mac Eoin (FG)	Charles Fagan (Ind.)
15th	1954	Erskine H. Childers (FF)	Frank Carter (FF)	Michael Kennedy (FF)	Seán Mac Eoin (FG)	Charles Fagan (FG)
16th	1957	Erskine H. Childers (FF)	Ruairí Ó Brádaigh (SF)	Michael Kennedy (FF)	Seán Mac Eoin (FG)	Charles Fagan (FG)
17th	1961	Frank Carter (FF)	Joe Sheridan (Ind.)	Michael Kennedy (FF)	Seán Mac Eoin (FG)	4 seats 1961–1992
18th	1965	Frank Carter (FF)	Joe Sheridan (Ind.)	Patrick Lenihan (FF)	Gerry L'Estrange (FG)	4 seats 1961–1992
19th	1969	Frank Carter (FF)	Joe Sheridan (Ind.)	Patrick Lenihan (FF)	Gerry L'Estrange (FG)	4 seats 1961–1992
19th	1970 by-election	Frank Carter (FF)	Joe Sheridan (Ind.)	Patrick Cooney (FG)	Gerry L'Estrange (FG)	4 seats 1961–1992
20th	1973	Frank Carter (FF)	Joe Sheridan (Ind.)	Patrick Cooney (FG)	Gerry L'Estrange (FG)	4 seats 1961–1992
21st	1977	Albert Reynolds (FF)	Joe Sheridan (Ind.)	Seán Keegan (FF)	Gerry L'Estrange (FG)	4 seats 1961–1992
22nd	1981	Albert Reynolds (FF)	Patrick Cooney (FG)	Seán Keegan (FF)	Gerry L'Estrange (FG)	4 seats 1961–1992
23rd	1982 (Feb)	Albert Reynolds (FF)	Patrick Cooney (FG)	Seán Keegan (FF)	Gerry L'Estrange (FG)	4 seats 1961–1992
24th	1982 (Nov)	Albert Reynolds (FF)	Patrick Cooney (FG)	Mary O'Rourke (FF)	Gerry L'Estrange (FG)	4 seats 1961–1992
25th	1987	Albert Reynolds (FF)	Patrick Cooney (FG)	Mary O'Rourke (FF)	Henry Abbott (FF)	4 seats 1961–1992
26th	1989	Albert Reynolds (FF)	Louis Belton (FG)	Mary O'Rourke (FF)	Paul McGrath (FG)	4 seats 1961–1992
27th	1992	Constituency abolished. See Longford–Roscommon and Westmeath				

Dáil	Election	Deputy (Party)	Deputy (Party)	Deputy (Party)	Deputy (Party)	Deputy (Party)
30th	2007	Willie Penrose (Lab)	Peter Kelly (FF)	Mary O'Rourke (FF)	James Bannon (FG)	4 seats 2007–2024
31st	2011	Willie Penrose (Lab)	Robert Troy (FF)	Nicky McFadden (FG)	James Bannon (FG)	4 seats 2007–2024
31st	2014 by-election	Willie Penrose (Lab)	Robert Troy (FF)	Gabrielle McFadden (FG)	James Bannon (FG)	4 seats 2007–2024
32nd	2016	Willie Penrose (Lab)	Robert Troy (FF)	Kevin "Boxer" Moran (Ind.)	Peter Burke (FG)	4 seats 2007–2024
33rd	2020	Sorca Clarke (SF)	Robert Troy (FF)	Joe Flaherty (FF)	Peter Burke (FG)	4 seats 2007–2024
34th	2024	Sorca Clarke (SF)	Robert Troy (FF)	Kevin "Boxer" Moran (Ind.)	Peter Burke (FG)	Micheál Carrigy (FG)

Dáil	Election	Deputy (Party)	Deputy (Party)	Deputy (Party)
27th	1992	Willie Penrose (Lab)	Mary O'Rourke (FF)	Paul McGrath (FG)
28th	1997	Willie Penrose (Lab)	Mary O'Rourke (FF)	Paul McGrath (FG)
29th	2002	Willie Penrose (Lab)	Donie Cassidy (FF)	Paul McGrath (FG)
30th	2007	Constituency abolished. See Longford–Westmeath		
