= 2002 Irish general election =

Election to the 29th Dáil

- 17 May 2002

166 seats in Dáil Éireann (Note: Including Séamus Pattison (Lab), returned automatically for Carlow–Kilkenny as outgoing Ceann Comhairle, under Art. 16.6 of the Constitution and the Electoral Act 1992.) 84 seats needed for a majority
- Turnout: 62.6% ▼3.3 pp
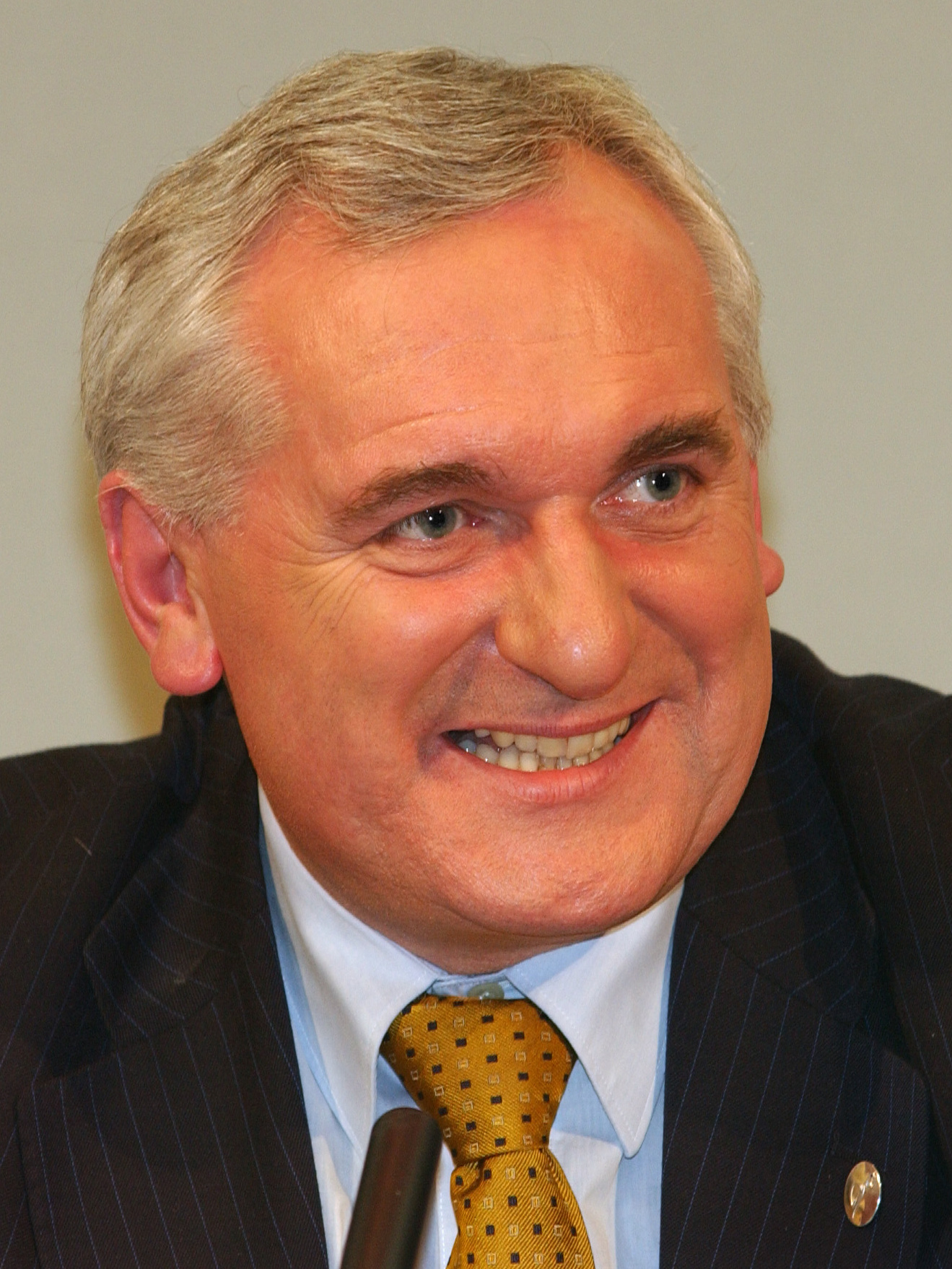

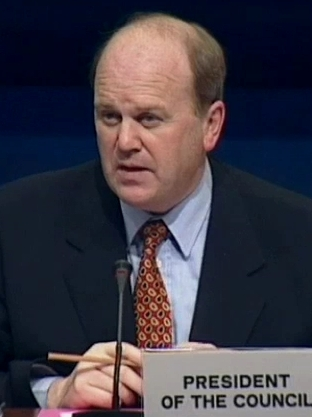

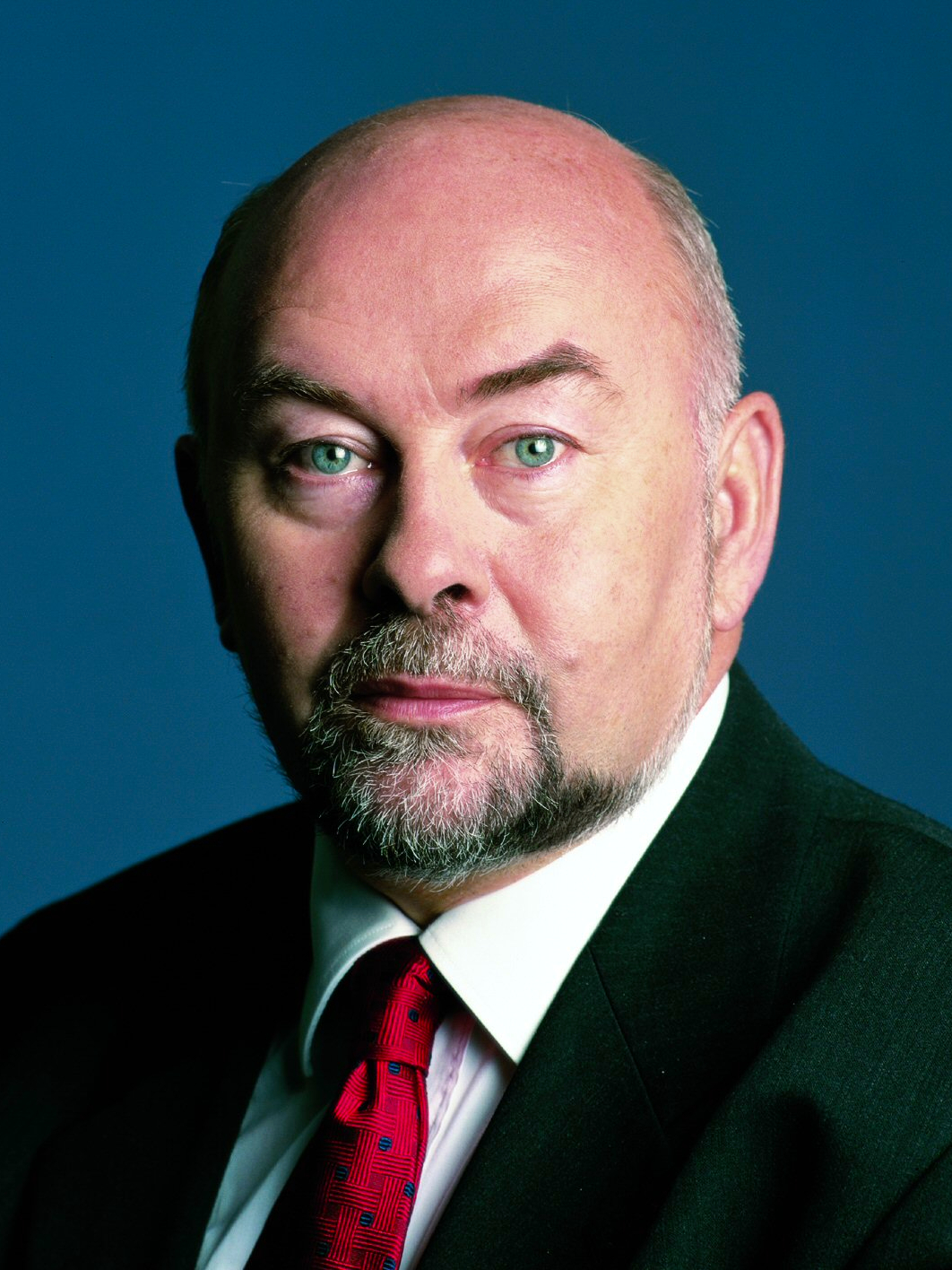

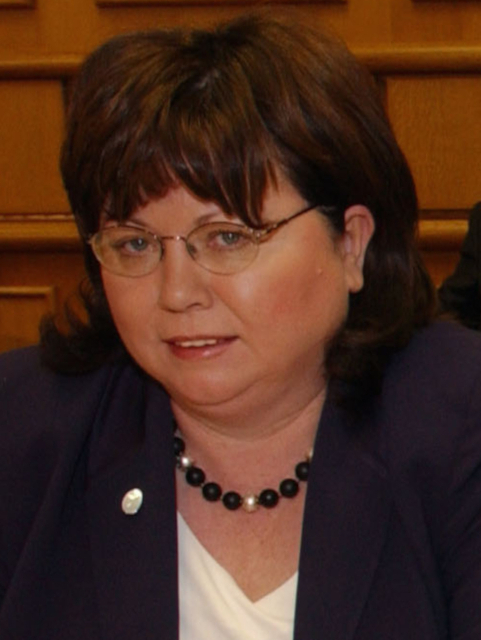

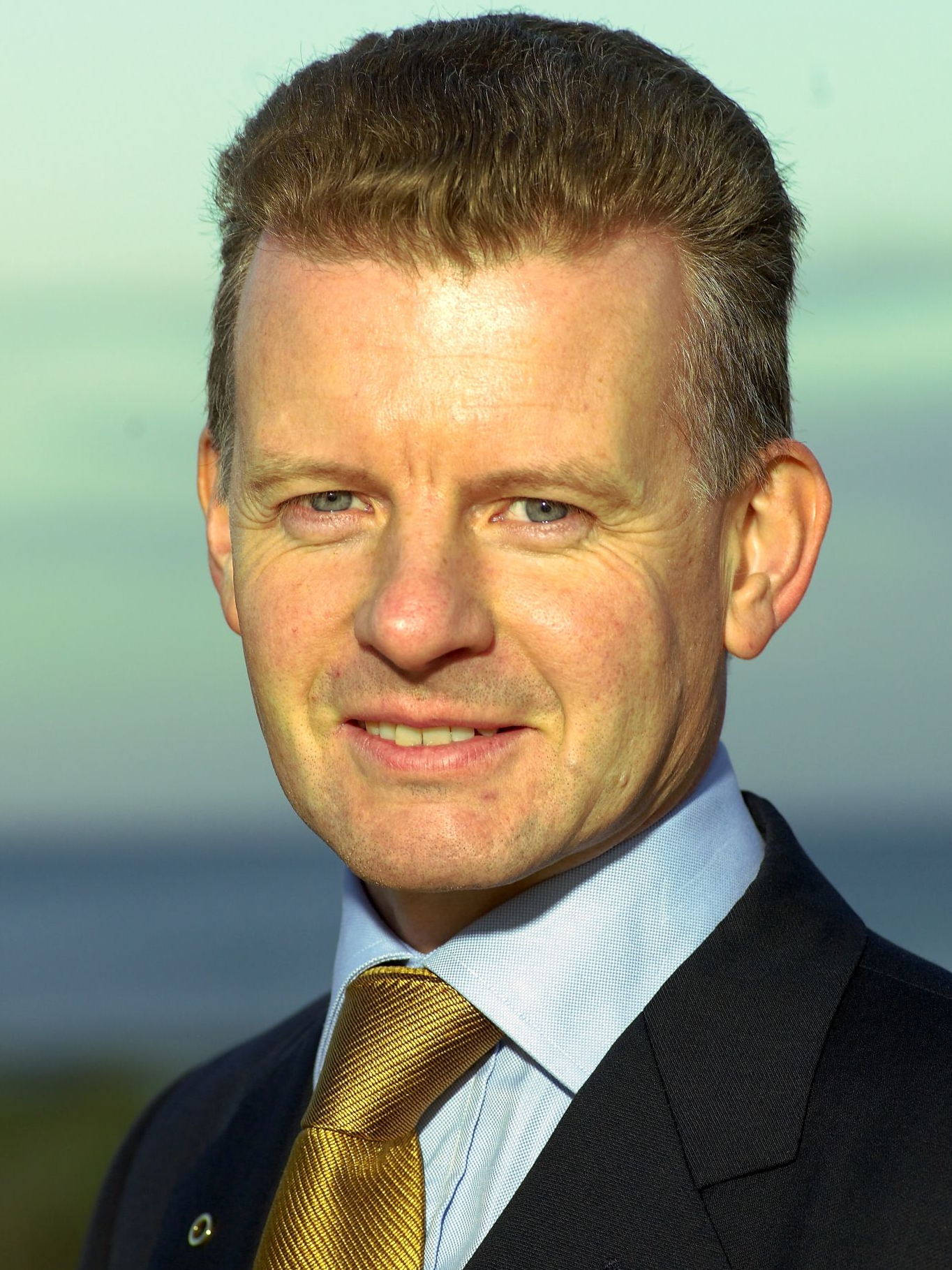

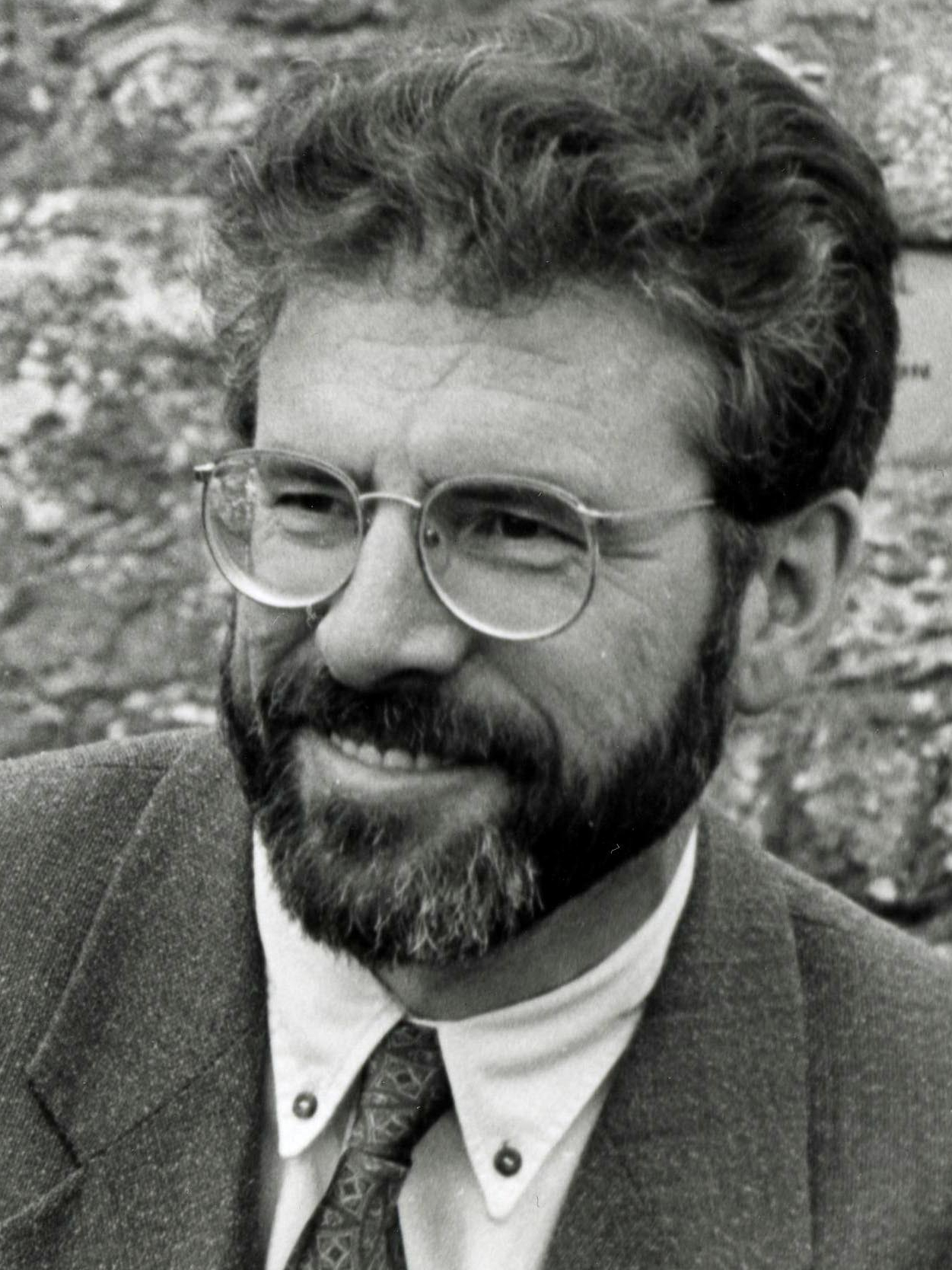
	First party	Second party	Third party
Leader	Bertie Ahern	Michael Noonan	Ruairi Quinn
Party	Fianna Fáil	Fine Gael	Labour
Leader since	19 December 1994	9 February 2001	November 1997
Leader's seat	Dublin Central	Limerick East	Dublin South-East
Last election	77 seats, 39.3%	54 seats, 27.9%	17 seats, 12.9%
Seats won	81	31	21
Seat change	▲4	▼23	▲4 (Note: Democratic Left, which won 4 seats in 1997, merged with the Labour Party in 1999.)
Popular vote	770,748	417,619	200,130
Percentage	41.5%	22.5%	10.8%
Swing	▲2.2 pp	▼5.4 pp	▼2.1 pp
	Fourth party	Fifth party	Sixth party
Leader	Mary Harney	Trevor Sargent	Gerry Adams
Party	Progressive Democrats	Green	Sinn Féin
Leader since	12 October 1993	6 October 2001	13 November 1983
Leader's seat	Dublin South-West	Dublin North	N/A (Note: Adams sat as the abstentionist MP for Belfast West in the UK Parliament; Caoimhghín Ó Caoláin (TD for Cavan–Monaghan) was leader of the party in the Dáil.)
Last election	4 seats, 4.7%	2 seats, 2.8%	1 seat, 2.6%
Seats won	8	6	5
Seat change	▲4	▲4	▲4
Popular vote	73,628	71,470	121,020
Percentage	4.0%	3.8%	6.5%
Swing	▼0.7 pp	▲1.0 pp	▲3.9 pp
Taoiseach before election
Bertie Ahern
Fianna Fáil
Taoiseach after election
Bertie Ahern
Fianna Fáil

The 2002 Irish general election to the 29th Dáil was held on Friday, 17 May, just over three weeks after the dissolution of the 28th Dáil on Thursday, 25 April by President Mary McAleese, at the request of the Taoiseach, Bertie Ahern. The general election took place in 42 Dáil constituencies throughout Ireland for 166 seats in Dáil Éireann, the house of representatives of the Oireachtas, with a revision of constituencies since the last election under the Electoral (Amendment) (No. 2) Act 1998. The outgoing minority Fianna Fáil–Progressive Democrat administration was returned with a majority of 10.

The 29th Dáil met at Leinster House on Thursday, 6 June to nominate the Taoiseach for appointment by the president and to approve the appointment of a new government of Ireland. Bertie Ahern was re-appointed Taoiseach, forming the 26th government of Ireland, a majority coalition government of Fianna Fáil and the Progressive Democrats.

== Overview ==
The general election was significant for a number of reasons:

- The election was considered a success for Fianna Fáil, with the party coming within a handful of seats from achieving an overall majority (the nearest the country came to a single-party government since 1987) and winning the most first-preference votes in every single Dáil constituency. The only high-profile loss was cabinet minister Mary O'Rourke losing her seat in Westmeath.
- The re-election of the Fianna Fáil–Progressive Democrats government, the first occasion since 1969 that an Irish government won re-election.
- The meltdown in Fine Gael support, which saw the main opposition party drop from 54 to 31 seats, and lose all but three seats in Dublin.
- The failure of the Labour Party, contrary to all expectations, to increase its seat total. Later in the year, Ruairi Quinn stepped down as leader of the Labour Party. He was replaced by Pat Rabbitte, who was one of four Democratic Left TDs who joined in a merger with Labour in 1999. The most high-profile loss for the party was the defeat of former leader Dick Spring in Kerry.
- The success of the Green Party, which increased its TDs from two to six, including its first TD outside of Dublin.
- The electoral success of Sinn Féin, which increased its seat number from one to five.
- The election of a large number of independent candidates.
- Contrary to what opinion polls and political pundits were predicting, the Progressive Democrats kept all of their seats, and picked up four more.
- It was the first time electronic voting machines were used in an Irish election. They were used in three constituencies: Dublin North, Dublin West and Meath. They would not be used again at a general election.

== Fine Gael ==
The most noticeable feature of the election was the collapse in Fine Gael's vote. It suffered its second worst electoral result ever (after the 1948 general election), with several prominent members failing to get re-elected, including:

- Alan Dukes – former party leader
- Jim Mitchell – deputy leader
- Nora Owen – former deputy leader and former Minister for Justice
- Austin Currie – former presidential candidate
- Jim Higgins – former Chief Whip
- Alan Shatter – front bench member
- Deirdre Clune – front bench member
- Michael Creed – front bench member
- Frances Fitzgerald – front bench member

The party's losses were especially pronounced in Dublin, where just three TDs (Richard Bruton, Gay Mitchell and Olivia Mitchell) were returned, fewer than Fianna Fáil, Labour, the Progressive Democrats or the Greens. The reasons for the drop in support for Fine Gael are many and varied:

- There was an element of bad luck in some losses, and the proportion of seats they lost (42.6%) was much greater than the proportion of votes (25.2%).
- In 2002, the Irish economy was booming, unemployment was low, and the outgoing government was a stable one that had lasted its full term.
- No other opposition party, noticeably Labour, would agree to a pre-election pact with Fine Gael, sensing the unpopularity of the party. This meant that no-one felt that Fine Gael would be able to lead a government after the election. In contrast, the two parties of the outgoing government fought the election on a united front.
- The Fine Gael party was poorly organised in Dublin, and morale was low.
- The political landscape had changed in Ireland since Fine Gael's heyday in the 1980s. The Progressive Democrats and the Green Party in particular ate into Fine Gael's middle class support, and anti-Fianna Fáil voters had a much wider range of parties to choose from. All 4 of the extra seats won by the Green Party were at the expense of Fine Gael, as were 3 out of 4 of the Progressive Democrats' gains.
- Toward the end of the campaign, Michael McDowell warned that because Fianna Fáil were so high in the opinion polls, they could form a government by themselves. This led to a significant shift to the Progressive Democrats at the last minute, and many Fine Gael voters voted strategically for the Progressive Democrats to avoid a single-party Fianna Fáil government.

In the immediate aftermath of the election, Fine Gael leader Michael Noonan announced his resignation from the leadership and Enda Kenny was chosen as the new leader in the subsequent election.

== Results ==
Party	Fianna Fáil	Fine Gael	Labour Party	Sinn Féin	Progressive Democrats	Green Party	Socialist Party
Leader	Bertie Ahern	Michael Noonan	Ruairi Quinn	Gerry Adams	Mary Harney	Trevor Sargent	Joe Higgins
Votes	41.5%, 770,748	22.5%, 417,619	10.8%, 200,130	6.5%, 121,020	4.0%, 73,628	3.8%, 71,470	0.8%, 14,896
Seats	81 (48.8%)	31 (18.7%)	20 (12.7%)	5 (3.0%)	8 (4.8%)	6 (3.6%)	1 (0.6%)

↓
81	8	15	31	20	6	5	1
Fianna Fáil	PDs	Inds	Fine Gael	Labour Party	Green Party	Sinn Féin

Vote Share of different parties in the election.
1. Fianna Fáil (41.5%)
2. Fine Gael (22.5%)
3. Labour Party (10.8%)
4. Sinn Féin (6.50%)
5. Progressive Democrats (4.00%)
6. Green Party (3.80%)
7. Socialist Party (0.80%)
8. Other (10.1%)

Election to the 29th Dáil – 17 May 2002
Party	Leader	Seats	±	% of seats	First pref. votes	% FPv	±%
Fianna Fáil	Bertie Ahern	81	▲8	48.8	770,748	41.5	▲2.2
Fine Gael	Michael Noonan	31	▼23	18.7	417,619	22.5	▼5.4
Labour	Ruairi Quinn	21	▲4	12.7	200,130	10.8	▼2.1
Sinn Féin	Gerry Adams	5	▲4	3.0	121,020	6.5	▲4.0
Progressive Democrats	Mary Harney	8	▲4	4.8	73,628	4.0	▼0.7
Green	Trevor Sargent	6	▲4	3.6	71,470	3.8	▲1.0
Socialist Party	Joe Higgins	1	0	0.6	14,896	0.8	▲0.1
Christian Solidarity		0	0	0.0	4,741	0.3	▼0.2
Workers' Party	Seán Garland	0	0	0.0	4,012	0.2	▼0.2
Socialist Workers	N/A	0	0	0.0	3,333	0.2	▲0.1
Independent	N/A	13	▲7	7.8	176,305	9.5	▲2.6
Spoilt votes					20,707	—N/a	—N/a
Total		166	0	100	1,878,609	100	—N/a
Electorate/Turnout					3,002,173	62.6	—N/a

Independents include Independent Health Alliance candidates (12,296 votes, 1 seat) and Independent Fianna Fáil (6,124 votes, 1 seat).

=== Voting summary ===
First preference vote
Fianna Fáil	41.48%
Fine Gael	22.48%
Labour	10.77%
Sinn Féin	6.51%
Progressive Democrats	3.96%
Green	3.85%
Socialist	0.80%
Others	0.65%
Independent	9.49%

=== Seats summary ===
Dáil seats
Fianna Fáil	48.80%
Fine Gael	18.67%
Labour	12.05%
Progressive Democrats	4.82%
Green	3.85%
Sinn Féin	3.61%
Socialist	0.60%
Independent	7.83%

== Government formation ==
Fianna Fáil and the Progressive Democrats formed the 26th government of Ireland, a majority coalition government. As of 2025 it is the only coalition government in Irish politics to have been returned after a general election.

== Dáil membership changes ==
The following changes took place as a result of the election:

- 22 outgoing TDs retired
- 143 TDs stood for re-election (plus the Ceann Comhairle, Séamus Pattison who was automatically returned)
  - 110 of those were re-elected
  - 33 failed to be re-elected
- 55 successor TDs were elected
  - 47 were elected for the first time
  - 8 had previously been TDs
- There were 7 successor female TDs, replacing 6 outgoing, increasing the total number by 1 to 22
- There were changes in 38 of 42 constituencies contested

Outgoing TDs are listed in the constituency they contested in the election. For some, such as Marian McGennis, this differs from the constituency they represented in the outgoing Dáil. Where more than one change took place in a constituency the concept of successor is an approximation for presentation only.

Constituency	Departing TD	Party	Change	Comment	Successor TD	Party
Carlow–Kilkenny	John Browne	Fine Gael	Retired	Nolan – Former TD	M. J. Nolan	Fianna Fáil
Cavan–Monaghan	Andrew Boylan	Fine Gael	Lost seat		Paudge Connolly	Independent
Clare	Brendan Daly	Fianna Fáil	Lost seat		James Breen	Independent
Clare	Donal Carey	Fine Gael	Lost seat		Pat Breen	Fine Gael
Cork East	Paul Bradford	Fine Gael	Lost seat	Sherlock – Former TD	Joe Sherlock	Labour Party
Cork North-Central	Liam Burke	Fine Gael	Retired	Lynch – Former TD	Kathleen Lynch	Labour Party
Cork North-West	Michael Creed	Fine Gael	Lost seat		Gerard Murphy	Fine Gael
Cork South-Central	Deirdre Clune	Fine Gael	Lost seat		Dan Boyle	Green Party
Cork South-West	P. J. Sheehan	Fine Gael	Lost seat		Denis O'Donovan	Fianna Fáil
Donegal North-East	Harry Blaney	Ind. Fianna Fáil	Retired		Niall Blaney	Ind. Fianna Fáil
Donegal South-West	Tom Gildea	Independent	Retired	Gallagher – Former TD	Pat "the Cope" Gallagher	Fianna Fáil
Dublin Central	Jim Mitchell	Fine Gael	Lost seat	Mitchell – FG Deputy Leader. Fitzpatrick – Former TD	Dermot Fitzpatrick	Fianna Fáil
Dublin Central				Former TD (took McGennis' seat)	Joe Costello	Labour Party
Dublin Mid-West	Austin Currie	Fine Gael	Lost seat	Currie – Former Presidential candidate	Paul Gogarty	Green Party
Dublin Mid-West	New constituency, new seat				John Curran	Fianna Fáil
Dublin North	Nora Owen	Fine Gael	Lost seat	Owen – Former Minister for Justice	Jim Glennon	Fianna Fáil
Dublin North-Central	Derek McDowell	Labour Party	Lost seat		Finian McGrath	Independent Health Alliance
Dublin North-East	Michael Joe Cosgrave	Fine Gael	Lost seat	Seats reduced from 4 to 3		
Dublin North-West	Proinsias De Rossa	Labour Party	Retired	Seats reduced from 4 to 3		
Dublin South	Alan Shatter	Fine Gael	Lost seat	Shatter – Fine Gael Front Bench member	Eamon Ryan	Green Party
Dublin South-Central	Ben Briscoe	Fianna Fáil	Retired		Michael Mulcahy	Fianna Fáil
Dublin South-Central	Marian McGennis	Fianna Fáil	Lost seat	McGennis prev held Dublin Central	Aengus Ó Snodaigh	Sinn Féin
Dublin South-East	Frances Fitzgerald	Fine Gael	Lost seat	McDowell – Former TD	Michael McDowell	Progressive Democrats
Dublin South-West	Brian Hayes	Fine Gael	Lost seat		Seán Crowe	Sinn Féin
Dublin South-West	Chris Flood	Fianna Fáil	Retired		Charlie O'Connor	Fianna Fáil
Dublin West	Liam Lawlor	Independent	Retired	Burton – Former TD	Joan Burton	Labour Party
Dún Laoghaire	David Andrews	Fianna Fáil	Retired		Barry Andrews	Fianna Fáil
Dún Laoghaire	Seán Barrett	Fine Gael	Retired		Fiona O'Malley	Progressive Democrats
Dún Laoghaire	Monica Barnes	Fine Gael	Retired		Ciarán Cuffe	Green Party
Galway East	Michael P. Kitt	Fianna Fáil	Lost seat		Joe Callanan	Fianna Fáil
Galway East	Ulick Burke	Fine Gael	Lost seat		Paddy McHugh	Independent
Galway West	Bobby Molloy	Progressive Democrats	Retired		Noel Grealish	Progressive Democrats
Kerry North	Denis Foley	Independent	Retired		Tom McEllistrim	Fianna Fáil
Kerry North	Dick Spring	Labour Party	Lost seat	Spring – Former Leader of the Labour Party	Martin Ferris	Sinn Féin
Kerry South	No membership changes					
Kildare North	No membership changes					
Kildare South	Alan Dukes	Fine Gael	Lost seat	Dukes – Former Leader of Fine Gael	Seán Ó Fearghaíl	Fianna Fáil
Laois–Offaly	Tom Enright	Fine Gael	Retired		Olwyn Enright	Fine Gael
Laois–Offaly	Charles Flanagan	Fine Gael	Lost seat		Tom Parlon	Progressive Democrats
Limerick East	Desmond O'Malley	Progressive Democrats	Retired	Former leader of the Progressive Democrats	Tim O'Malley	Progressive Democrats
Limerick East	Eddie Wade	Fianna Fáil	Lost seat		Peter Power	Fianna Fáil
Limerick West	Michael Finucane	Fine Gael	Lost seat		John Cregan	Fianna Fáil
Longford–Roscommon	Seán Doherty	Fianna Fáil	Retired		Michael Finneran	Fianna Fáil
Longford–Roscommon	Louis Belton	Fine Gael	Lost seat		Mae Sexton	Progressive Democrats
Longford–Roscommon	Albert Reynolds	Fianna Fáil	Retired	Reynolds – Former Taoiseach	Peter Kelly	Fianna Fáil
Louth	Brendan McGahon	Fine Gael	Retired		Fergus O'Dowd	Fine Gael
Louth	Michael Bell	Labour Party	Lost seat		Arthur Morgan	Sinn Féin
Mayo	Jim Higgins	Fine Gael	Lost seat	Higgins – Former Chief Whip	Jerry Cowley	Independent
Mayo	Tom Moffatt	Fianna Fáil	Lost seat		John Carty	Fianna Fáil
Meath	John V. Farrelly	Fine Gael	Lost seat		Damien English	Fine Gael
Sligo–Leitrim	Matt Brennan	Fianna Fáil	Retired		Jimmy Devins	Fianna Fáil
Sligo–Leitrim	Gerry Reynolds	Fine Gael	Lost seat		Marian Harkin	Independent
Tipperary North	Michael O'Kennedy	Fianna Fáil	Retired		Máire Hoctor	Fianna Fáil
Tipperary South	No membership changes					
Waterford	Austin Deasy	Fine Gael	Retired		John Deasy	Fine Gael
Waterford	Brendan Kenneally	Fianna Fáil	Lost seat		Ollie Wilkinson	Fianna Fáil
Westmeath	Mary O'Rourke	Fianna Fáil	Lost seat		Donie Cassidy	Fianna Fáil
Wexford	Hugh Byrne	Fianna Fáil	Lost seat		Tony Dempsey	Fianna Fáil
Wexford	Michael D'Arcy	Fine Gael	Lost seat		Liam Twomey	Independent
Wexford	Ivan Yates	Fine Gael	Retired		Paul Kehoe	Fine Gael
Wicklow	No membership changes					

The cross-party seat transfers are summarized thus:

Election to the 28th Dáil – seats won/lost by party, 1997–2002
Party	1997	27th Dáil	Gain from (loss to)																2002
Party	1997	27th Dáil	FF		FG		Lab		SF		PD		Grn		Soc		Ind		2002
Fianna Fáil	77	(3)			7					(1)							2	(1)	81
Fine Gael	54	–		(7)				(2)		(1)		(4)		(4)				(5)	31
Labour Party	21	–			2					(2)							1	(1)	21
Sinn Féin	1	–	1		1		2												5
Progressive Democrats	4	–			4														8
Green Party	2	–			4														6
Socialist Party	1	–																	1
Independents	6	3	1	(2)	5		1	(1)											13
Total	166	–	2	(9)	23	–	3	(3)	–	(4)	–	(4)	–	(4)	–	–	3	(7)	166

== Seanad election ==
The Dáil election was followed by the election to the 22nd Seanad.
