= Michael Finneran =

Irish former politician (born 1947)

Minister of State
- 2008–2011: Environment, Heritage and Local Government

Teachta Dála
- In office May 2007 – February 2011
- Constituency: Roscommon–South Leitrim
- In office May 2002 – May 2007
- Constituency: Longford–Roscommon

Senator
- In office 1 November 1989 – 17 May 2002
- Constituency: Administrative Panel

Personal details
- Born: 10 September 1947 (age 79) Roscommon, Ireland
- Party: Fianna Fáil

Michael Finneran (born 10 September 1947) is an Irish former Fianna Fáil politician who served as Minister of State for the Environment, Heritage and Local Government from 2008 to 2011. He served as a Teachta Dála (TD) from 2002 to 2011 and a Senator for the Administrative Panel from 1989 to 2002.

A former psychiatric nurse, Finneran was first elected to Dáil Éireann at the 2002 general election for the Longford–Roscommon constituency. He was previously a member of Seanad Éireann from 1989 to 2002.

On 13 May 2008, shortly after Brian Cowen became Taoiseach, he was appointed as Minister of State at the Department of the Environment, Community and Local Government with special responsibility for Housing, Urban Renewal and Developing Areas. His area of responsibility was changed to Housing and Local Services in 2009.

He retired from politics at the 2011 general election.

Political offices
Preceded by Batt O'Keeffe	Minister of State for Housing and Local Services; 2008–2011	Office abolished

Dáil	Election	Deputy (Party)	Deputy (Party)	Deputy (Party)	Deputy (Party)
27th	1992	Albert Reynolds (FF)	Seán Doherty (FF)	Tom Foxe (Ind.)	John Connor (FG)
28th	1997	Albert Reynolds (FF)	Seán Doherty (FF)	Louis Belton (FG)	Denis Naughten (FG)
29th	2002	Peter Kelly (FF)	Michael Finneran (FF)	Mae Sexton (PDs)	Denis Naughten (FG)
30th	2007	Constituency abolished. See Longford–Westmeath and Roscommon–South Leitrim			

Dáil	Election	Deputy (Party)	Deputy (Party)	Deputy (Party)
30th	2007	Michael Finneran (FF)	Frank Feighan (FG)	Denis Naughten (FG)
31st	2011	Luke 'Ming' Flanagan (Ind.)	Frank Feighan (FG)	Denis Naughten (FG)
31st	2014 by-election	Michael Fitzmaurice (Ind.)	Frank Feighan (FG)	Denis Naughten (FG)
32nd	2016	Constituency abolished. See Roscommon–Galway and Sligo–Leitrim		
