= Independent Health Alliance =

Defunct Irish political party

- Founded: 2002
- Dissolved: 2002
- Ideology: Healthcare Provision; Welfare State

The Independent Health Alliance was an electoral alliance which contested the 2002 Irish general election. The Alliance campaigned on the provision of health services in Ireland, which was a constant criticism of the Fianna Fáil–Progressive Democrats coalition government. It also campaigned for disability rights.

The Alliance fielded eight candidates for the 2002 election including Offaly County Councillor Molly Buckley, Dublin City Councillor Finian McGrath, and former Limerick Hurling manager Tom Ryan. Only Finian McGrath was elected in Dublin North-Central. The Alliance broke up shortly afterwards.
