= Seán Doherty (Roscommon politician) =

Irish politician (1944–2005)

Cathaoirleach of Seanad Éireann
- In office 1 November 1989 – 23 January 1992
- Preceded by: Tras Honan
- Succeeded by: Seán Fallon

Minister for Justice
- In office 9 March 1982 – 14 December 1982
- Taoiseach: Charles Haughey
- Preceded by: Jim Mitchell
- Succeeded by: Michael Noonan

Minister of State
- 1980–1981: Justice

Teachta Dála
- In office November 1992 – May 2002
- Constituency: Longford–Roscommon
- In office June 1981 – June 1989
- Constituency: Roscommon
- In office June 1977 – June 1981
- Constituency: Roscommon–Leitrim

Senator
- In office 1 November 1989 – 25 November 1992
- Constituency: Administrative Panel

Personal details
- Born: 29 June 1944 Cootehall, County Roscommon, Ireland
- Died: 7 June 2005 (aged 60) Letterkenny, County Donegal, Ireland
- Party: Fianna Fáil
- Spouse: Maura Nangle (m. 1974)
- Children: 4
- Education: University College Dublin; King's Inns

Seán Doherty (29 June 1944 – 7 June 2005) was an Irish Fianna Fáil politician who served as Cathaoirleach of Seanad Éireann from 1989 to 1992, Minister for Justice from March 1982 to December 1982 and Minister of State for Justice from 1980 to 1981. He served as a Teachta Dála (TD) from 1977 to 1989 and 1992 to 2002. He was a Senator for the Administrative Panel from 1989 to 1992.

== Background ==
Born and raised in Cootehall near Boyle, County Roscommon, he was educated at national level in County Leitrim and then at University College Dublin and King's Inns.

In 1965, Doherty became a member of the Garda Síochána and served as a Detective in Sligo before joining the Special Branch in Dublin in the early 1970s.

Doherty came from a family which had a long tradition of public service and political involvement in County Roscommon. In 1973, Doherty took a seat on Roscommon County Council, which was vacant after the death of his father.

Doherty married Maura Nangle, who is the sister of Irish musician Carmel Gunning. Together they had four daughters, Rachel Doherty was a councillor on Roscommon County Council.

== Political career ==
After serving for four years as a local representative on Roscommon County Council, Doherty was elected as a Fianna Fáil TD for the Roscommon–Leitrim constituency at the 1977 general election.

=== Support of Charles Haughey ===
At the 1979 Fianna Fáil leadership election, Doherty was a key member of the "gang of five" which supported Charles Haughey's campaign. The other members were Albert Reynolds, Mark Killilea Jnr, Tom McEllistrim and Jackie Fahey. Haughey was successful in the contest and Doherty served as Minister of State at the Department of Justice from 1979 to 1981. In the short-lived 1982 Fianna Fáil government, Doherty entered cabinet as Minister for Justice.

=== Dowra affair ===
The brother of Seán Doherty's wife Maura, Garda Thomas Nangle, was charged with assaulting James McGovern, a native of County Fermanagh, in a public house in December 1981. On 27 September 1982, hours before the case was due to be heard in the District Court in Dowra, a small village in northwest County Cavan, McGovern was arrested by the Special Branch of the RUC on the basis of entirely false Garda intelligence that he was involved in terrorism. The case against Nangle was dismissed because the principal witness, McGovern, failed to appear in court. The solicitor representing Nangle was Kevin Doherty, Seán Doherty's brother. This use of Garda/RUC Special Branch liaison, set up under the Anglo-Irish Agreement in 1985, prevented meetings between the Garda Commissioner and the RUC chief constable for almost three years.

=== Phone tapping ===
After Doherty left office it was revealed in The Irish Times that he had ordered the tapping of three journalists' home telephones. The newspaper also disclosed that he had been interfering in the workings of the Gardaí and the administration of justice for both political and personal reasons. In February 1983, he resigned from the parliamentary party. He was readmitted in December 1984. He was re-elected at the 1987 general election.

=== Seanad Éireann ===
At the 1989 general election, he was defeated by the independent candidate Tom Foxe. He also unsuccessfully contested the 1989 European Parliament election held on the same day as the general election. Later in 1989, he was elected to Seanad Éireann on the Administrative Panel. He was elected as Cathaoirleach of the 19th Seanad.

=== Resignations of Doherty and Haughey ===
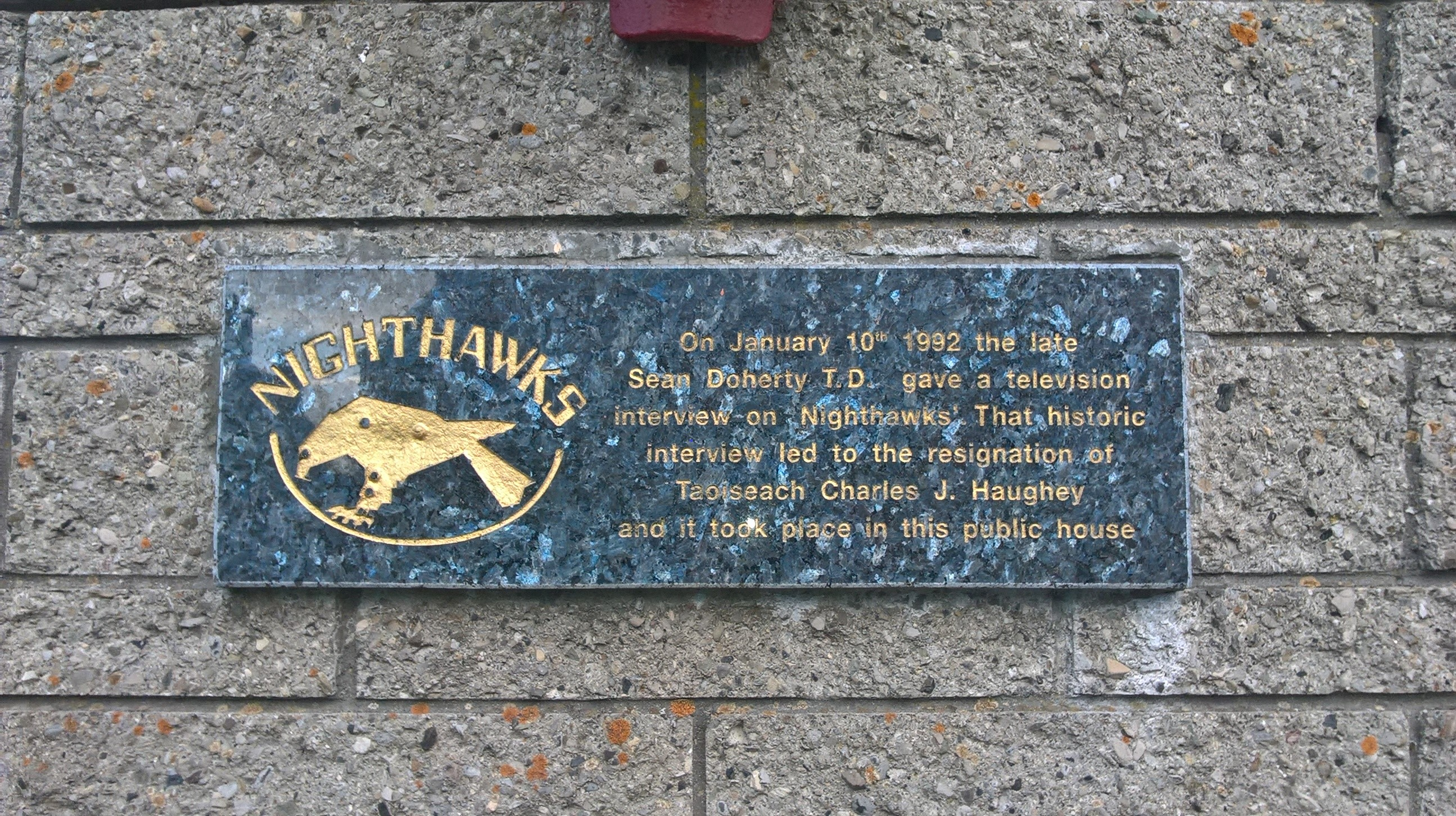
Plaque at the Hells Kitchen Railway Museum (Castlerea).

Doherty declared in an interview on Nighthawks that he had shown transcripts of the tapped phone conversations to Charles Haughey while Haughey was Taoiseach in 1982. Doherty had previously denied this. On 22 January 1992, resigned as Cathaoirleach "to preserve the integrity of the House from any impact resulting from last night's disclosures". Haughey continued to deny the claim, but was forced to resign as leader of Fianna Fáil and as Taoiseach.

Doherty was elected for Longford–Roscommon at the 1992 general election and held his seat until his retirement at the 2002 general election.

== Death ==
Seán Doherty died at Letterkenny General Hospital as a result of a brain haemorrhage on 7 June 2005 while on a family holiday in County Donegal.

Political offices
New office	Minister of State for Justice; 1980–1981	Succeeded by Dick Spring
Preceded by Jim Mitchell	Minister for Justice; Mar.–Dec. 1982	Succeeded by Michael Noonan
Oireachtas
Preceded by Tras Honan	Cathaoirleach of Seanad Éireann; 1989–1992	Succeeded by Seán Fallon

Dáil	Election	Deputy (Party)	Deputy (Party)	Deputy (Party)
19th	1969	Hugh Gibbons (FF)	Brian Lenihan (FF)	Joan Burke (FG)
20th	1973	Hugh Gibbons (FF)	Patrick J. Reynolds (FG)	Joan Burke (FG)
21st	1977	Terry Leyden (FF)	Seán Doherty (FF)	Joan Burke (FG)
22nd	1981	Constituency abolished. See Roscommon and Sligo–Leitrim		

Dáil	Election	Deputy (Party)	Deputy (Party)	Deputy (Party)	Deputy (Party)
4th	1923	George Noble Plunkett (Rep)	Henry Finlay (CnaG)	Gerald Boland (Rep)	Andrew Lavin (CnaG)
4th	1925 by-election	George Noble Plunkett (Rep)	Martin Conlon (CnaG)	Gerald Boland (Rep)	Andrew Lavin (CnaG)
5th	1927 (Jun)	Patrick O'Dowd (FF)	Martin Conlon (CnaG)	Gerald Boland (FF)	Michael Brennan (Ind.)
6th	1927 (Sep)	Patrick O'Dowd (FF)	Martin Conlon (CnaG)	Gerald Boland (FF)	Michael Brennan (Ind.)
7th	1932	Daniel O'Rourke (FF)	Martin Conlon (CnaG)	Gerald Boland (FF)	Frank MacDermot (NCP)
8th	1933	Patrick O'Dowd (FF)	Michael Brennan (CnaG)	Gerald Boland (FF)	Frank MacDermot (NCP)
9th	1937	Michael Brennan (FG)	Daniel O'Rourke (FF)	Gerald Boland (FF)	3 seats 1937–1948
10th	1938	Michael Brennan (FG)	Daniel O'Rourke (FF)	Gerald Boland (FF)	3 seats 1937–1948
11th	1943	John Meighan (CnaT)	John Beirne (CnaT)	Gerald Boland (FF)	3 seats 1937–1948
12th	1944	Daniel O'Rourke (FF)	John Beirne (CnaT)	Gerald Boland (FF)	3 seats 1937–1948
13th	1948	Daniel O'Rourke (FF)	John Beirne (CnaT)	Gerald Boland (FF)	Jack McQuillan (CnaP)
14th	1951	John Finan (CnaT)	John Beirne (CnaT)	Gerald Boland (FF)	Jack McQuillan (Ind.)
15th	1954	James Burke (FG)	John Beirne (CnaT)	Gerald Boland (FF)	Jack McQuillan (Ind.)
16th	1957	James Burke (FG)	John Beirne (CnaT)	Gerald Boland (FF)	Jack McQuillan (Ind.)
17th	1961	James Burke (FG)	Patrick J. Reynolds (FG)	Brian Lenihan Snr (FF)	Jack McQuillan (NPD)
17th	1964 by-election	Joan Burke (FG)	Patrick J. Reynolds (FG)	Brian Lenihan Snr (FF)	Jack McQuillan (NPD)
18th	1965	Joan Burke (FG)	Patrick J. Reynolds (FG)	Brian Lenihan Snr (FF)	Hugh Gibbons (FF)
19th	1969	Constituency abolished. See Roscommon–Leitrim			

Dáil	Election	Deputy (Party)	Deputy (Party)	Deputy (Party)
22nd	1981	Terry Leyden (FF)	Seán Doherty (FF)	John Connor (FG)
23rd	1982 (Feb)	Terry Leyden (FF)	Seán Doherty (FF)	Liam Naughten (FG)
24th	1982 (Nov)	Terry Leyden (FF)	Seán Doherty (FF)	Liam Naughten (FG)
25th	1987	Terry Leyden (FF)	Seán Doherty (FF)	Liam Naughten (FG)
26th	1989	Terry Leyden (FF)	Tom Foxe (Ind.)	John Connor (FG)
27th	1992	Constituency abolished. See Longford–Roscommon		

Dáil	Election	Deputy (Party)	Deputy (Party)	Deputy (Party)	Deputy (Party)
27th	1992	Albert Reynolds (FF)	Seán Doherty (FF)	Tom Foxe (Ind.)	John Connor (FG)
28th	1997	Albert Reynolds (FF)	Seán Doherty (FF)	Louis Belton (FG)	Denis Naughten (FG)
29th	2002	Peter Kelly (FF)	Michael Finneran (FF)	Mae Sexton (PDs)	Denis Naughten (FG)
30th	2007	Constituency abolished. See Longford–Westmeath and Roscommon–South Leitrim			
