= Louis Belton =

Irish politician (1943–2023)

Teachta Dála
- In office June 1997 – May 2002
- Constituency: Longford–Roscommon
- In office June 1989 – November 1992
- Constituency: Longford–Westmeath

Senator
- In office 17 February 1993 – 6 June 1997
- Constituency: Administrative Panel

Personal details
- Born: 30 November 1943 County Longford, Ireland
- Died: 11 November 2023 (aged 79) Mullingar, County Westmeath, Ireland
- Party: Fine Gael
- Education: St Mel's College

Louis J. Belton (30 November 1943 – 11 November 2023) was an Irish Fine Gael politician from Kenagh, County Longford, and the seventh member of the Belton family to be elected to the Oireachtas.

Formerly a building society employee, Belton was a member of Longford County Council from 1979 to 1999. He was elected to Dáil Éireann at the 1989 general election as Teachta Dála (TD) for the Longford–Westmeath constituency, but lost his seat at the 1992 general election when contesting the revised Longford–Roscommon constituency.

However, he was then elected to the 20th Seanad in 1993, when he topped the poll for the Administrative Panel. He regained his Dáil seat at the 1997 general election but lost it again at the 2002 general election to Mae Sexton of the Progressive Democrats. He did not contest the 2007 general election. His brother Patrick was a county councillor and Mayor of Longford.

Belton died at the Midland Regional Hospital, Mullingar on 11 November 2023, aged 79.

== See also ==
- Families in the Oireachtas

| Dáil | Election | Deputy (Party) | Deputy (Party) | Deputy (Party) | Deputy (Party) | Deputy (Party) |
|---|---|---|---|---|---|---|
| 2nd | 1921 | Lorcan Robbins (SF) | Seán Mac Eoin (SF) | Joseph McGuinness (SF) | Laurence Ginnell (SF) | 4 seats 1921–1923 |
| 3rd | 1922 | John Lyons (Lab) | Seán Mac Eoin (PT-SF) | Francis McGuinness (PT-SF) | Laurence Ginnell (AT-SF) | 4 seats 1921–1923 |
| 4th | 1923 | John Lyons (Ind) | Conor Byrne (Rep) | James Killane (Rep) | Patrick Shaw (CnaG) | Patrick McKenna (FP) |
| 5th | 1927 (Jun) | Henry Broderick (Lab) | Michael Kennedy (FF) | James Victory (FF) | Patrick Shaw (CnaG) | Hugh Garahan (FP) |
| 6th | 1927 (Sep) | Henry Broderick (Lab) | Michael Kennedy (FF) | James Killane (FF) | Patrick Shaw (CnaG) | Michael Connolly (CnaG) |
| 6th | 1930 by-election | Henry Broderick (Lab) | Michael Kennedy (FF) | James Geoghegan (FF) | Patrick Shaw (CnaG) | Michael Connolly (CnaG) |
| 7th | 1932 | Francis Gormley (FF) | Michael Kennedy (FF) | James Geoghegan (FF) | Patrick Shaw (CnaG) | Seán Mac Eoin (CnaG) |
| 8th | 1933 | James Victory (FF) | Michael Kennedy (FF) | James Geoghegan (FF) | Charles Fagan (NCP) | Seán Mac Eoin (CnaG) |
| 9th | 1937 | Constituency abolished. See Athlone–Longford and Meath–Westmeath | | | | |

| Dáil | Election | Deputy (Party) | Deputy (Party) | Deputy (Party) | Deputy (Party) | Deputy (Party) |
|---|---|---|---|---|---|---|
| 13th | 1948 | Erskine H. Childers (FF) | Thomas Carter (FF) | Michael Kennedy (FF) | Seán Mac Eoin (FG) | Charles Fagan (Ind) |
| 14th | 1951 | Erskine H. Childers (FF) | Frank Carter (FF) | Michael Kennedy (FF) | Seán Mac Eoin (FG) | Charles Fagan (Ind) |
| 15th | 1954 | Erskine H. Childers (FF) | Frank Carter (FF) | Michael Kennedy (FF) | Seán Mac Eoin (FG) | Charles Fagan (FG) |
| 16th | 1957 | Erskine H. Childers (FF) | Ruairí Ó Brádaigh (SF) | Michael Kennedy (FF) | Seán Mac Eoin (FG) | Charles Fagan (FG) |
| 17th | 1961 | Frank Carter (FF) | Joe Sheridan (Ind) | Michael Kennedy (FF) | Seán Mac Eoin (FG) | 4 seats 1961–1992 |
| 18th | 1965 | Frank Carter (FF) | Joe Sheridan (Ind) | Patrick Lenihan (FF) | Gerry L'Estrange (FG) | 4 seats 1961–1992 |
| 19th | 1969 | Frank Carter (FF) | Joe Sheridan (Ind) | Patrick Lenihan (FF) | Gerry L'Estrange (FG) | 4 seats 1961–1992 |
| 19th | 1970 by-election | Frank Carter (FF) | Joe Sheridan (Ind) | Patrick Cooney (FG) | Gerry L'Estrange (FG) | 4 seats 1961–1992 |
| 20th | 1973 | Frank Carter (FF) | Joe Sheridan (Ind) | Patrick Cooney (FG) | Gerry L'Estrange (FG) | 4 seats 1961–1992 |
| 21st | 1977 | Albert Reynolds (FF) | Joe Sheridan (Ind) | Seán Keegan (FF) | Gerry L'Estrange (FG) | 4 seats 1961–1992 |
| 22nd | 1981 | Albert Reynolds (FF) | Patrick Cooney (FG) | Seán Keegan (FF) | Gerry L'Estrange (FG) | 4 seats 1961–1992 |
| 23rd | 1982 (Feb) | Albert Reynolds (FF) | Patrick Cooney (FG) | Seán Keegan (FF) | Gerry L'Estrange (FG) | 4 seats 1961–1992 |
| 24th | 1982 (Nov) | Albert Reynolds (FF) | Patrick Cooney (FG) | Mary O'Rourke (FF) | Gerry L'Estrange (FG) | 4 seats 1961–1992 |
| 25th | 1987 | Albert Reynolds (FF) | Patrick Cooney (FG) | Mary O'Rourke (FF) | Henry Abbott (FF) | 4 seats 1961–1992 |
| 26th | 1989 | Albert Reynolds (FF) | Louis Belton (FG) | Mary O'Rourke (FF) | Paul McGrath (FG) | 4 seats 1961–1992 |
| 27th | 1992 | Constituency abolished. See Longford–Roscommon and Westmeath | | | | |

| Dáil | Election | Deputy (Party) | Deputy (Party) | Deputy (Party) | Deputy (Party) | Deputy (Party) |
|---|---|---|---|---|---|---|
| 30th | 2007 | Willie Penrose (Lab) | Peter Kelly (FF) | Mary O'Rourke (FF) | James Bannon (FG) | 4 seats 2007–2024 |
| 31st | 2011 | Willie Penrose (Lab) | Robert Troy (FF) | Nicky McFadden (FG) | James Bannon (FG) | 4 seats 2007–2024 |
| 31st | 2014 by-election | Willie Penrose (Lab) | Robert Troy (FF) | Gabrielle McFadden (FG) | James Bannon (FG) | 4 seats 2007–2024 |
| 32nd | 2016 | Willie Penrose (Lab) | Robert Troy (FF) | Kevin "Boxer" Moran (Ind) | Peter Burke (FG) | 4 seats 2007–2024 |
| 33rd | 2020 | Sorca Clarke (SF) | Robert Troy (FF) | Joe Flaherty (FF) | Peter Burke (FG) | 4 seats 2007–2024 |
| 34th | 2024 | Sorca Clarke (SF) | Robert Troy (FF) | Kevin "Boxer" Moran (Ind) | Peter Burke (FG) | Micheál Carrigy (FG) |

| Dáil | Election | Deputy (Party) | Deputy (Party) | Deputy (Party) | Deputy (Party) |
|---|---|---|---|---|---|
| 27th | 1992 | Albert Reynolds (FF) | Seán Doherty (FF) | Tom Foxe (Ind) | John Connor (FG) |
| 28th | 1997 | Albert Reynolds (FF) | Seán Doherty (FF) | Louis Belton (FG) | Denis Naughten (FG) |
| 29th | 2002 | Peter Kelly (FF) | Michael Finneran (FF) | Mae Sexton (PDs) | Denis Naughten (FG) |
| 30th | 2007 | Constituency abolished. See Longford–Westmeath and Roscommon–South Leitrim | | | |
