= Seymour Crawford =

Irish politician (1944–2018)

Teachta Dála
- In office November 1992 – February 2011
- Constituency: Cavan–Monaghan

Monaghan County Councillor
- In office June 1991 – September 2003
- Constituency: Clones

Personal details
- Born: 1 June 1944 Monaghan, Ireland
- Died: 21 October 2018 (aged 74) Cavan, Ireland
- Party: Fine Gael
- Education: Queen's University Belfast

Seymour Crawford (1 June 1944 – 21 October 2018) was an Irish Fine Gael politician who served as a TD for the Cavan–Monaghan constituency from 1992 to 2011.

Crawford was elected as a TD at the 1992 general election to the 27th Dáil. He was re-elected to Dáil Éireann at the 1997, 2002 and 2007 general elections. He was a member of Monaghan County Council from June 1991 until September 2003. In 2004, he served as vice-chairperson of the British-Irish Inter-Parliamentary Body and was a member from 1993 to 2007.

He was vice-president of the Irish Farmers' Association from 1984 to 1988. He was a member of Newbliss Presbyterian Church and was the only Ulster Protestant and Presbyterian member of the Oireachtas during his term in the Dáil. He received the Bastow Memorial Award for service in meat and livestock in 1985.

He retired from politics at the 2011 general election. Crawford died on 21 October 2018.

Dáil	Election	Deputy (Party)	Deputy (Party)	Deputy (Party)	Deputy (Party)	Deputy (Party)
21st	1977	Jimmy Leonard (FF)	John Wilson (FF)	Thomas J. Fitzpatrick (FG)	Rory O'Hanlon (FF)	John Conlan (FG)
22nd	1981	Kieran Doherty (AHB)	John Wilson (FF)	Thomas J. Fitzpatrick (FG)	Rory O'Hanlon (FF)	John Conlan (FG)
23rd	1982 (Feb)	Jimmy Leonard (FF)	John Wilson (FF)	Thomas J. Fitzpatrick (FG)	Rory O'Hanlon (FF)	John Conlan (FG)
24th	1982 (Nov)	Jimmy Leonard (FF)	John Wilson (FF)	Thomas J. Fitzpatrick (FG)	Rory O'Hanlon (FF)	John Conlan (FG)
25th	1987	Jimmy Leonard (FF)	John Wilson (FF)	Thomas J. Fitzpatrick (FG)	Rory O'Hanlon (FF)	Andrew Boylan (FG)
26th	1989	Jimmy Leonard (FF)	John Wilson (FF)	Bill Cotter (FG)	Rory O'Hanlon (FF)	Andrew Boylan (FG)
27th	1992	Jimmy Leonard (FF)	Brendan Smith (FF)	Seymour Crawford (FG)	Rory O'Hanlon (FF)	Andrew Boylan (FG)
28th	1997	Caoimhghín Ó Caoláin (SF)	Brendan Smith (FF)	Seymour Crawford (FG)	Rory O'Hanlon (FF)	Andrew Boylan (FG)
29th	2002	Caoimhghín Ó Caoláin (SF)	Brendan Smith (FF)	Seymour Crawford (FG)	Rory O'Hanlon (FF)	Paudge Connolly (Ind.)
30th	2007	Caoimhghín Ó Caoláin (SF)	Brendan Smith (FF)	Seymour Crawford (FG)	Rory O'Hanlon (FF)	Margaret Conlon (FF)
31st	2011	Caoimhghín Ó Caoláin (SF)	Brendan Smith (FF)	Heather Humphreys (FG)	Joe O'Reilly (FG)	Seán Conlan (FG)
32nd	2016	Caoimhghín Ó Caoláin (SF)	Brendan Smith (FF)	Heather Humphreys (FG)	Niamh Smyth (FF)	4 seats 2016–2020
33rd	2020	Matt Carthy (SF)	Brendan Smith (FF)	Heather Humphreys (FG)	Niamh Smyth (FF)	Pauline Tully (SF)
34th	2024	Matt Carthy (SF)	Brendan Smith (FF)	David Maxwell (FG)	Niamh Smyth (FF)	Cathy Bennett (SF)
