= Tom Moffatt =

Irish former politician (born 1940)

Minister of State
- 1997–2002: Health and Children

Teachta Dála
- In office June 1997 – June 2002
- Constituency: Mayo
- In office November 1992 – May 1997
- Constituency: Mayo East

Personal details
- Born: January 1940 (age 86) Ballina, County Mayo, Ireland
- Party: Fianna Fáil
- Spouse: Patricia Cashman
- Education: University College Galway

Tom Moffatt (born January 1940) is an Irish former Fianna Fáil politician. Moffatt was elected to Dáil Éireann a Fianna Fáil Teachta Dála (TD) for the Mayo East constituency at the 1992 general election. He was re-elected for the Mayo constituency at the 1997 general election.

In July 1997 he was appointed as Minister of State at the Department of Health in the government of Bertie Ahern. He lost his seat at the 2002 general election.

Dáil	Election	Deputy (Party)	Deputy (Party)	Deputy (Party)
19th	1969	Seán Flanagan (FF)	Thomas O'Hara (FG)	Martin Finn (FG)
20th	1973	Seán Flanagan (FF)	Seán Calleary (FF)	Martin Finn (FG)
21st	1977	P. J. Morley (FF)	Seán Calleary (FF)	Paddy O'Toole (FG)
22nd	1981	P. J. Morley (FF)	Seán Calleary (FF)	Paddy O'Toole (FG)
23rd	1982 (Feb)	P. J. Morley (FF)	Seán Calleary (FF)	Paddy O'Toole (FG)
24th	1982 (Nov)	P. J. Morley (FF)	Seán Calleary (FF)	Paddy O'Toole (FG)
25th	1987	P. J. Morley (FF)	Seán Calleary (FF)	Jim Higgins (FG)
26th	1989	P. J. Morley (FF)	Seán Calleary (FF)	Jim Higgins (FG)
27th	1992	P. J. Morley (FF)	Tom Moffatt (FF)	Jim Higgins (FG)
28th	1997	Constituency abolished. See Mayo		

Dáil	Election	Deputy (Party)	Deputy (Party)	Deputy (Party)	Deputy (Party)	Deputy (Party)
28th	1997	Beverley Flynn (FF)	Tom Moffatt (FF)	Enda Kenny (FG)	Michael Ring (FG)	Jim Higgins (FG)
29th	2002	Beverley Flynn (FF)	John Carty (FF)	Enda Kenny (FG)	Michael Ring (FG)	Jerry Cowley (Ind.)
30th	2007	Beverley Flynn (Ind.)	Dara Calleary (FF)	Enda Kenny (FG)	Michael Ring (FG)	John O'Mahony (FG)
31st	2011	Michelle Mulherin (FG)	Dara Calleary (FF)	Enda Kenny (FG)	Michael Ring (FG)	John O'Mahony (FG)
32nd	2016	Lisa Chambers (FF)	Dara Calleary (FF)	Enda Kenny (FG)	Michael Ring (FG)	4 seats 2016–2024
33rd	2020	Rose Conway-Walsh (SF)	Dara Calleary (FF)	Alan Dillon (FG)	Michael Ring (FG)	4 seats 2016–2024
34th	2024	Rose Conway-Walsh (SF)	Dara Calleary (FF)	Alan Dillon (FG)	Keira Keogh (FG)	Paul Lawless (Aon)
