= 1992 Irish general election =

Election to the 27th Dáil

- 25 November 1992

166 seats in Dáil Éireann (Note: Including Seán Treacy (Ind), returned automatically for Tipperary South as outgoing Ceann Comhairle, under Art. 16.6 of the Constitution and the Electoral Act 1963, as amended.) 84 seats needed for a majority
- Turnout: 68.5% 0.0 pp
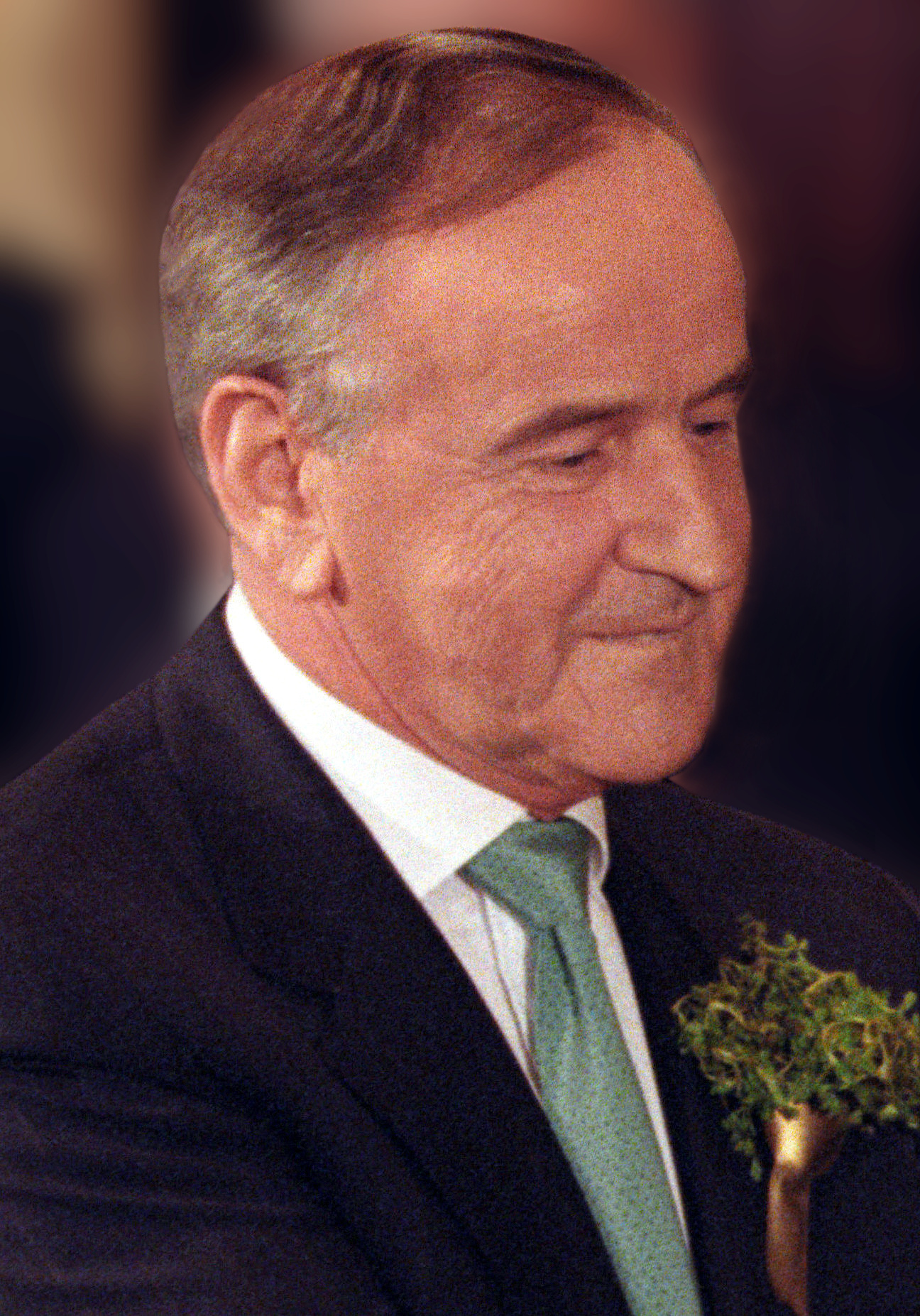

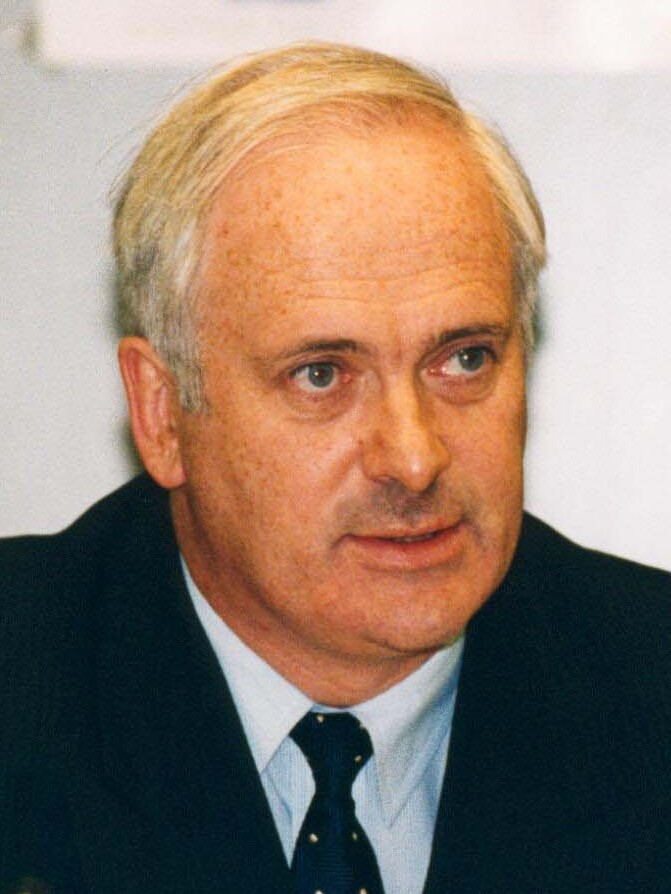

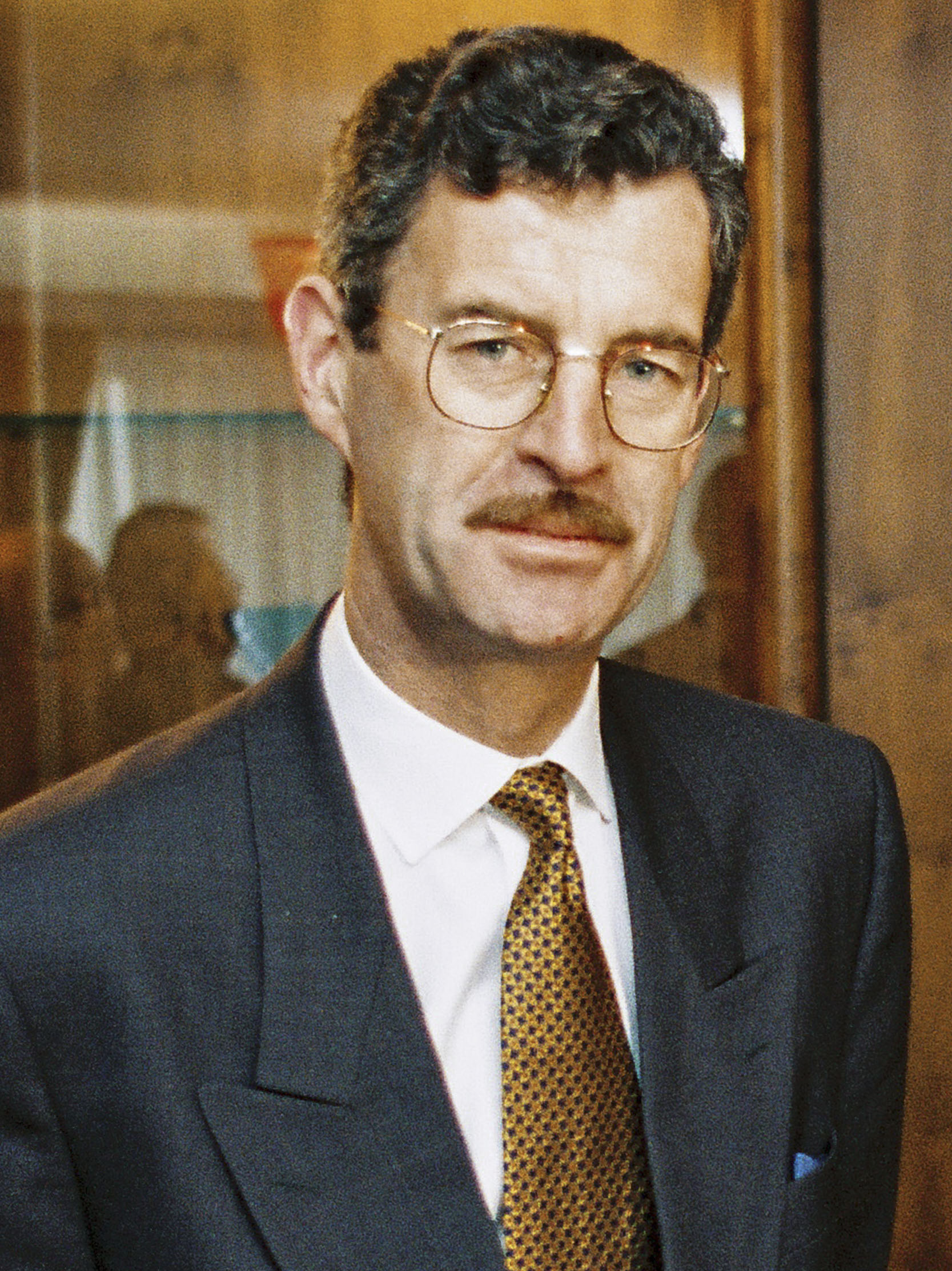

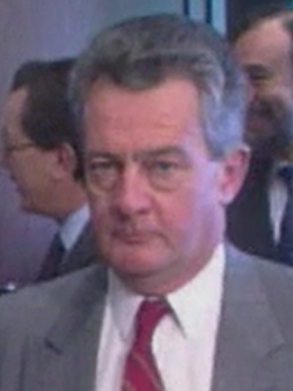

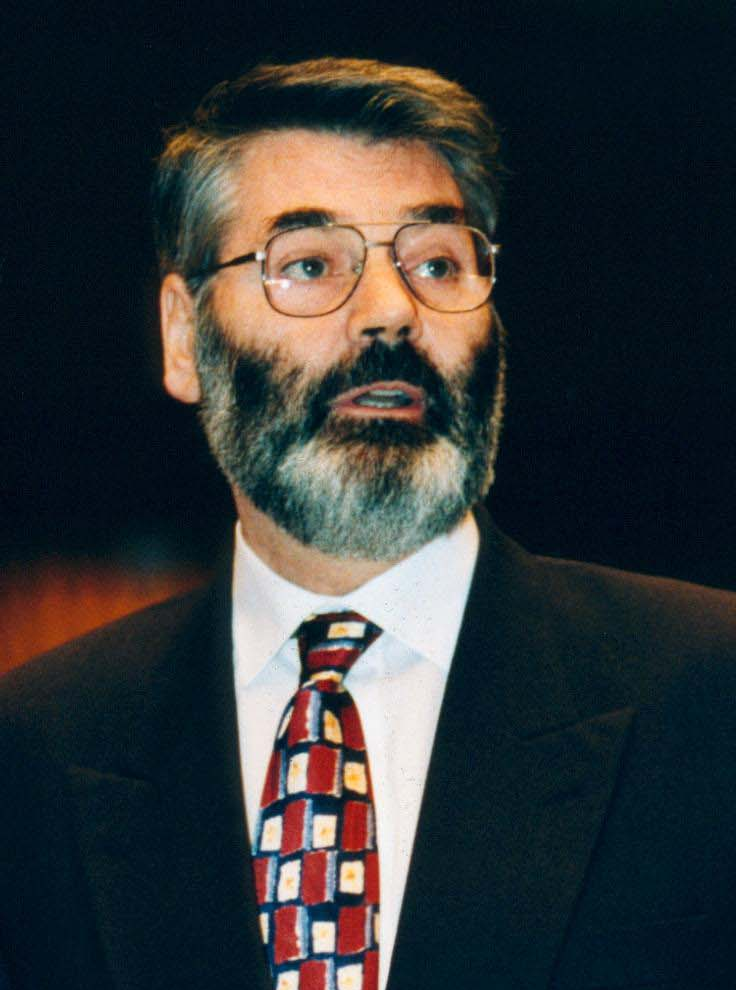
	First party	Second party	Third party
Leader	Albert Reynolds	John Bruton	Dick Spring
Party	Fianna Fáil	Fine Gael	Labour
Leader since	6 February 1992	20 November 1990	November 1982
Leader's seat	Longford–Roscommon	Meath	Kerry North
Last election	77 seats, 44.2%	55 seats, 29.2%	15 seats, 9.5%
Seats won	68	45	33
Seat change	▼9	▼10	▲18
Popular vote	674,650	422,106	333,013
Percentage	39.1%	24.5%	19.3%
Swing	▼5.1 pp	▼4.7 pp	▲9.8 pp
	Fourth party	Fifth party	Sixth party
			GP
Leader	Desmond O'Malley	Proinsias De Rossa	—
Party	Progressive Democrats	Democratic Left	Green
Leader since	21 December 1985	1992	—
Leader's seat	Limerick East	Dublin North-West	—
Last election	6 seats, 5.5%	New	1 seat, 1.5%
Seats won	10	4	1
Seat change	▲4	New	0
Popular vote	80,787	47,945	24,110
Percentage	4.7%	2.8%	1.4%
Swing	▼0.8 pp	New	▼0.1 pp
Taoiseach before election
Albert Reynolds
Fianna Fáil
Taoiseach after election
Albert Reynolds
Fianna Fáil

The 1992 Irish general election to the 27th Dáil was held on Wednesday, 25 November, almost three weeks after the dissolution of the 26th Dáil on 5 November by President Mary Robinson, on the request of Taoiseach Albert Reynolds following a defeat of the government in a motion of confidence. The general election took place in 41 Dáil constituencies throughout Ireland for 166 seats in Dáil Éireann, the house of representatives of the Oireachtas, under a revision in the Electoral (Amendment) Act 1990. Three referendums on abortion were held on the same date.

The 27th Dáil met at Leinster House on 14 December 1992 to nominate the Taoiseach for appointment by the president and to approve the appointment of a new government of Ireland. No government was formed on that date, but on 12 January 1993, Reynolds was re-appointed Taoiseach, forming the 23rd government of Ireland, a coalition government of Fianna Fáil and the Labour Party.

== Campaign ==
The general election of 1992 was precipitated by the collapse of the Fianna Fáil–Progressive Democrats coalition government. Allegations of dishonesty at the Beef Tribunal forced Desmond O'Malley and his party to part ways with Albert Reynolds's Fianna Fáil. Both Albert Reynolds and John Bruton of Fine Gael were fighting their first general election as leader of their respective parties. For Reynolds it would be his only election as leader. The campaign went very poorly for Fianna Fáil with Reynolds's support dropping by 20%.

On the left, the Labour Party had increased their support in the local elections the previous year and many were predicting major gains for the party in the Dáil. The Workers' Party had split at a special convention that year over a motion to re-constitute the party, similar to the move made the same year by the Italian Communist Party, and sever all links with the Official IRA. Six out of their seven TDs and a majority of their councillors left the party when the motion failed to be passed and formed Democratic Left in early 1992.

Many political pundits had predicted that Fianna Fáil would not be re-elected and that a "Rainbow Coalition" involving Fine Gael, the Labour Party and possibly Democratic Left would be formed. John Bruton, the leader of Fine Gael, had problems of his own. Opinion polls showed that if a "Rainbow Coalition" came to power, Dick Spring of the Labour Party was seen as a better potential Taoiseach than Bruton. The possibility of a rotating Taoiseach was also hinted at in the media.

The big winner of the campaign was Dick Spring and the Labour Party. They distanced themselves completely from Fine Gael and fought an independent line. During the campaign Spring made very little comment about what the party would do after the election, however, he did say that if the Labour Party was part of a coalition he would have to be granted a turn as Taoiseach.

The election also saw Moosajee Bhamjee (Labour Party) become the first Muslim TD.

== Results ==
Election to the 27th Dáil – 25 November 1992
Party	Leader	Seats	±	% of seats	First pref. votes	% FPv	±%
Fianna Fáil	Albert Reynolds	68	▼9	41.0	674,650	39.1	▼5.0
Fine Gael	John Bruton	45	▼10	27.1	422,106	24.5	▼4.8
Labour	Dick Spring	33	▲18	19.8	333,013	19.3	▲9.8
Progressive Democrats	Desmond O'Malley	10	▲4	6.0	80,787	4.7	▼0.8
Democratic Left	Proinsias De Rossa	4	New	2.4	47,945	2.8	New
Sinn Féin	Gerry Adams	0	0	0	27,809	1.6	▲0.4
Green	N/A	1	0	0.6	24,110	1.4	▼0.1
Workers' Party	Tomás Mac Giolla	0	▼7 (Note: In early 1992, 6 Workers' Party TDs left the party and founded Democratic Left (DL).)	0	11,533	0.7	▼4.3
Christian Centrist		0	New	0	3,413	0.2	–
Independent	N/A	5	▲1	3.0	99,487	5.8	▲2.5
Spoilt votes					26,498	—N/a	—N/a
Total		166	0	100	1,751,351	100	—N/a
Electorate/Turnout					2,557,036	68.5%	—N/a

In 1989 the Democratic Socialist Party won 0.6% of the vote and 1 seat; the party merged with the Labour Party in 1990. Independents include Independent Fianna Fáil (5,248 votes, 1 seat).

=== Voting summary ===
First preference vote
Fianna Fáil	39.11%
Fine Gael	24.47%
Labour	19.31%
Progressive Democrats	4.68%
Democratic Left	2.78%
Sinn Féin	1.61%
Green	1.40%
Others	0.87%
Independent	5.77%

=== Seats summary ===
Dáil seats
Fianna Fáil	40.96%
Fine Gael	27.11%
Labour	19.88%
Progressive Democrats	6.02%
Democratic Left	2.41%
Green	0.60%
Independent	3.01%

== Government formation ==
Fianna Fáil had its worst performance since 1927, winning less than 40% of the vote. Fine Gael, in spite of predictions of success, lost 10 seats. The Labour Party recorded its best ever result, an event dubbed the "Spring Tide" and more than doubled its number of seats. Talks between Fine Gael and Labour on establishing a minority government floundered after several weeks, partly over the issue of the "revolving Taoiseach". Spring had to enter into coalition with Fianna Fáil, or force another election. The coalition deal proved very unpopular with many of Labour's supporters, because Dick Spring had campaigned heavily against Fianna Fáil and particularly Albert Reynolds. As a result of the coalition, Albert Reynolds was elected Taoiseach with over 100 votes, the biggest majority by any Taoiseach until 2011.

Following a number of scandals in 1994, particularly over the beef industry, the Labour Party left the coalition and, after negotiations, formed the Rainbow Coalition with Fine Gael and Democratic Left on 15 December 1994, as three by-election gains had by then made a Fine Gael-Labour-Democratic Left majority government possible. This was the first and to date, the only, time a new government with new coalition parties took office within a Dáil term.

== Dáil membership changes ==
The following changes took place as a result of the election:

- 11 outgoing TDs retired
- 155 TDs stood for re-election
  - 126 of those were re-elected
  - 30 failed to be re-elected
- 41 successor TDs were elected
  - 33 were elected for the first time
  - 8 had previously been TDs
- There were 10 successor female TDs, increasing the total number by 7 to 20
- There were changes in 29 of the 41 constituencies contested

Outgoing TDs are listed in the constituency they contested in the election. For some, such as John Stafford, this differs from the constituency they represented in the outgoing Dáil. Where more than one change took place in a constituency the concept of successor is an approximation for presentation only.

Constituency	Departing TD	Party	Change	Comment	Successor TD	Party
Carlow–Kilkenny	No membership changes					
Cavan–Monaghan	John Wilson	Fianna Fáil	Retired		Brendan Smith	Fianna Fáil
Cavan–Monaghan	Bill Cotter	Fine Gael	Lost seat		Seymour Crawford	Fine Gael
Clare	Brendan Daly	Fianna Fáil	Lost seat		Tony Killeen	Fianna Fáil
Clare	Madeleine Taylor-Quinn	Fine Gael	Lost seat		Moosajee Bhamjee	Labour Party
Cork East	Joe Sherlock	Democratic Left	Lost seat		John Mulvihill	Labour Party
Cork North-Central	Denis Lyons	Fianna Fáil	Lost seat	Burke – Former TD	Liam Burke	Fine Gael
Cork North-West	Laurence Kelly	Fianna Fáil	Lost seat	Moynihan – Former TD	Donal Moynihan	Fianna Fáil
Cork South-Central	John Dennehy	Fianna Fáil	Lost seat	O'Keeffe – Former TD	Batt O'Keeffe	Fianna Fáil
Cork South-Central	Pearse Wyse	Progressive Democrats	Retired		Pat Cox	Progressive Democrats
Cork South-West	No membership changes					
Donegal North-East	No membership changes					
Donegal South-West	No membership changes					
Dublin Central	Dermot Fitzpatrick	Fianna Fáil	Lost seat		Joe Costello	Labour Party
Dublin North			New seat		Trevor Sargent	Green Party
Dublin North-Central	Vincent Brady	Fianna Fáil	Retired		Derek McDowell	Labour Party
Dublin North-Central	Charles Haughey	Fianna Fáil	Retired	Son of outgoing TD	Seán Haughey	Fianna Fáil
Dublin North-Central	Pat Lee	Fine Gael	Lost seat	Previously represented Dublin Central but due to boundary changes ran in Dublin North-Central		
Dublin North-Central	John Stafford	Fianna Fáil	Lost seat	Previously represented Dublin Central but due to boundary changes ran in Dublin North-Central		
Dublin North-East	Michael Joe Cosgrave	Fine Gael	Lost seat		Seán Kenny	Labour Party
Dublin North-East	Pat McCartan	Democratic Left	Lost seat		Tommy Broughan	Labour Party
Dublin North-West	Michael Barrett	Fianna Fáil	Retired		Noel Ahern	Fianna Fáil
Dublin North-West	Jim Tunney	Fianna Fáil	Lost seat		Róisín Shortall	Labour Party
Dublin South	Nuala Fennell	Fine Gael	Retired		Eithne FitzGerald	Labour Party
Dublin South	Roger Garland	Green Party	Lost seat		Liz O'Donnell	Progressive Democrats
Dublin South-Central	Eric Byrne	Democratic Left	Lost seat		Pat Upton	Labour Party
Dublin South-Central	Fergus O'Brien	Fine Gael	Retired	Seats reduced from 5 to 4		
Dublin South-East	Garret FitzGerald	Fine Gael	Retired		Frances Fitzgerald	Fine Gael
Dublin South-East	Joe Doyle	Fine Gael	Lost seat	McDowell – Former TD	Michael McDowell	Progressive Democrats
Dublin South-East	Gerard Brady	Fianna Fáil	Lost seat		Eoin Ryan	Fianna Fáil
Dublin South-West			New seat		Éamonn Walsh	Labour Party
Dublin West	Tomás Mac Giolla	Workers' Party	Lost seat		Joan Burton	Labour Party
Dún Laoghaire	Monica Barnes	Fine Gael	Lost seat		Helen Keogh	Progressive Democrats
Dún Laoghaire	Brian Hillery	Fianna Fáil	Lost seat	Became a minister on first day	Niamh Bhreathnach	Labour Party
Galway East	No membership changes					
Galway West	Frank Fahey	Fianna Fáil	Lost seat		Éamon Ó Cuív	Fianna Fáil
Kerry North	Tom McEllistrim	Fianna Fáil	Lost seat	Foley – Former TD	Denis Foley	Fianna Fáil
Kerry South	Michael Moynihan	Labour Party	Retired	Daughter of outgoing TD	Breeda Moynihan-Cronin	Labour Party
Kildare	No membership changes					
Laois–Offaly	Tom Enright	Fine Gael	Lost seat		Pat Gallagher	Labour Party
Limerick East	No membership changes					
Limerick West	No membership changes					
Longford–Roscommon	Louis Belton	Fine Gael	Lost seat	Represented Longford–Westmeath but due to constituency changes was one of 5 outgoing TDs standing in this new 4 seat constituency		
Longford–Roscommon	Terry Leyden	Fianna Fáil	Lost seat	Doherty – Former TD	Seán Doherty	Fianna Fáil
Louth	No membership changes					
Mayo East	Seán Calleary	Fianna Fáil	Retired		Tom Moffatt	Fianna Fáil
Mayo West	Martin O'Toole	Fianna Fáil	Retired		Séamus Hughes	Fianna Fáil
Meath	John Farrelly	Fine Gael	Lost seat		Brian Fitzgerald	Labour Party
Sligo–Leitrim	Gerry Reynolds	Fine Gael	Lost seat		Declan Bree	Labour Party
Tipperary North	No membership changes					
Tipperary South	No membership changes					
Waterford	No membership changes					
Westmeath	Due to boundary changes, only 2 outgoing TDs from Longford–Westmeath moved to this 3-seat constituency				Willie Penrose	Labour Party
Wexford	Séamus Cullimore	Fianna Fáil	Lost seat	Byrne – Former TD	Hugh Byrne	Fianna Fáil
Wexford	Michael D'Arcy	Fine Gael	Lost seat	Doyle – Former TD	Avril Doyle	Fine Gael
Wicklow	Dick Roche	Fianna Fáil	Lost seat		Johnny Fox	Independent
Wicklow			New seat		Liz McManus	Democratic Left

== Seanad election ==
The Dáil election was followed in early 1993 by the election to the 20th Seanad.
