= Belton (surname) =

The surname Belton may refer to:

- Alexis Belton (born 1993), American golfer, long drive champion
- Andrew Belton (1882–1970), British Army officer
- Betty Belton (1916–1989), English cricketer
- Bill Belton (born 1993), American footballer
- Catherine Belton (born 1973), British journalist, Moscow correspondent for the Financial Times
- Cathy Belton (born 1970), Irish actress
- Charles Belton (1820–1891), English cricketer
- Claire Belton, American illustrator, created cartoon cat Pusheen
- Christopher Belton (born 1955), British writer
- Dane Belton (born 1999), American football player
- Daniel Belton (born 1970), New Zealand dancer
- Danielle Belton, American editor-in-chief of HuffPost
- Dave Belton (born 1964), American politician
- David Belton, British director, writer, and film producer
- Don Belton (1956–2009), openly gay African-American author
- Horace Belton (1955–2019), American football player
- Howard Belton (1893–1988), Oregon, US, farmer and politician
- Jack Belton (died 1963), Irish politician, builder and publican
- Jackie Belton (1895–1952), English footballer
- James Belton (1855–1935), Australian politician
- Janine Belton (born 1979), English swimmer
- John Belton (academic), Professor Emeritus of English and Film at Rutgers University
- Kai Belton, American politician from Connecticut
- Keith Belton (born 1981), American footballer
- Kevin Belton (born c. 1960), American chef, television presenter, author and educator
- Kim Belton (born 1958), American sports producer, former basketball player
- Louis Belton (1943–2023), Irish Fine Gael politician
- Luke Belton (1918–2006), Irish Fine Gael politician
- Michael J. Belton (1934–2018), American astronomer
- Paddy Belton (1926–1987), Irish politician, company director and publican
- Patrick Belton (1885–1945), Irish politician, leader of the Irish Christian Front
- Ray Belton, American academic administrator
- Richard Belton (1913–1974), Irish politician
- Robyn Belton (born 1947), New Zealand illustrator of children's books
- Roy Belton (1900 or 1901–1920), lynched white American murder suspect
- Sharon Sayles Belton (born 1951), American community leader, politician and activist
- Tracy Belton (born 1984), American football defensive back
- Willie Belton (1948–1992), American football running back

== See also ==
- Belton Richard
