= Belton =

Belton may refer to:

== People ==
- Belton Richard (1939–2017), Cajun musician
- Belton (surname), various people

== Places ==
=== Canada ===
- Belton, Ontario

=== United Kingdom ===
- Belton, North Lincolnshire, Lincolnshire
- Belton, South Kesteven, Lincolnshire
  - Belton House, a National Trust property
  - RAF Belton Park
- Belton, Leicestershire
- Belton with Browston, Norfolk
- Belton-in-Rutland

=== United States ===
- Belton, Kentucky
- Belton, Missouri
- Belton, Montana, known today as West Glacier
- Belton, South Carolina
- Belton, Texas

=== Extraterrestrial ===
- Belton Regio (formerly Cthulhu Regio), a dark region on Pluto

== Other ==
- Belton v. Gebhart, one of the cases which were combined into Brown v. Board of Education
- New York v. Belton, a 1981 United States Supreme Court cases concerning search and seizure
- HMS Belton (M1199)

== See also ==
- Bellton, West Virginia, United States
