= Members of the European Parliament (1958–1979) =

The European Parliament received delegations from several countries in the session from 1958 to 1979.

- MEPs for Belgium 1958–1979
- MEPs for Denmark 1973–1979
- MEPs for France 1958–1979
- MEPs for Ireland 1973
- MEPs for Ireland 1973–1977
- MEPs for Ireland 1977–1979
- MEPs for Italy 1958–1979
- MEPs for Luxembourg 1958–1979
- List of members of the European Parliament for the Netherlands, 1958–1979
- MEPs for the United Kingdom 1973–1979
- MEPs for West-Germany 1958–1979
