= Gerry L'Estrange =

Irish politician (1917–1996)

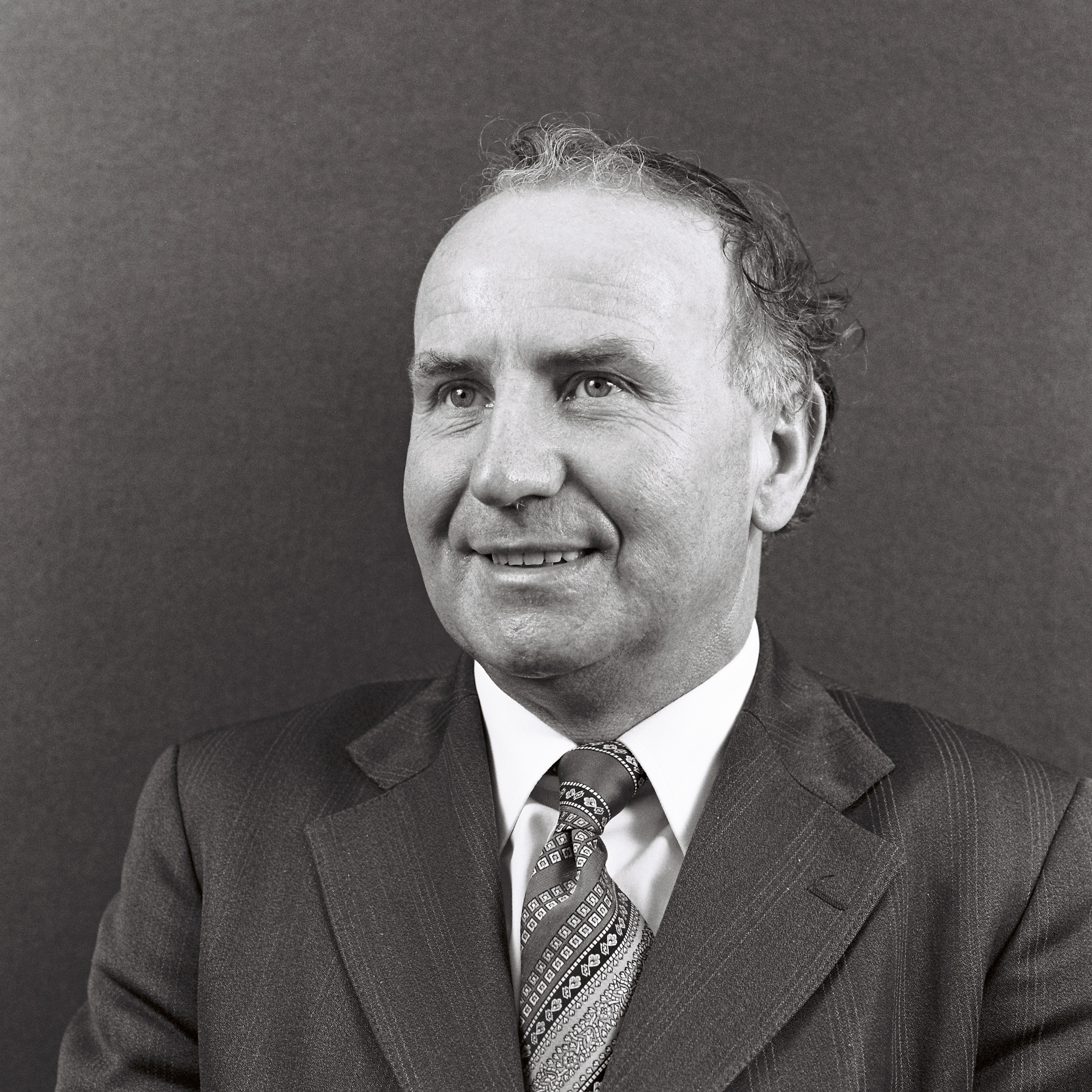

Minister of State
- 1981–1982: Health
- Jun.–Nov. 1981: Government Chief Whip
- Jun.–Nov. 1981: Defence

Teachta Dála
- In office April 1965 – February 1987
- Constituency: Longford–Westmeath

Member of the European Parliament
- In office 1 January 1973 – 4 June 1979
- Constituency: Oireachtas Delegation

Senator
- In office 22 July 1954 – 7 April 1965
- Constituency: Administrative Panel

Personal details
- Born: Mathew Gerrard Lestrange; 7 November 1917 Street, County Westmeath, Ireland
- Died: 5 April 1996 (aged 78) Multyfarnham, County Westmeath, Ireland
- Party: Fine Gael
- Other political affiliations: Clann na Talmhan
- Spouse: Aileen Kellaghan

Mathew Gerrard L'Estrange (7 November 1917 – 5 April 1996) was an Irish Fine Gael politician who served as Government Chief Whip and Minister of State at the Department of Defence from June 1981 to November 1981. He served as a Teachta Dála (TD) for the Longford–Westmeath from 1965 to 1987, a Member of the European Parliament (MEP) for the Oireachtas from 1973 to 1979 and a Senator for the Administrative Panel from 1954 to 1965.

== Political career ==
L'Estrange was elected to Westmeath County Council in 1942, and served on that body until 1981. He was cathaoirleach of the council for three years from 1959 to 1961 and served on virtually all the subsidiary and other bodies to which the council made appointments. He was chairman of the General Council of County Councils (Ireland) on three occasions, now known as the Association of County and City Councils.

L'Estrange was an unsuccessful Clann na Talmhan candidate for Dáil Éireann at the 1944 general election. He later joined Fine Gael and ran as their candidate at the 1948 general election, but was again unsuccessful. In 1954, he secured election to the 8th Seanad as a Senator for the Administrative Panel. He was re-elected in 1957 to 9th Seanad, and in 1961 to 10th Seanad.

After another unsuccessful candidacy at the 1961 general election, L'Estrange was finally elected to the 18th Dáil for the Longford–Westmeath constituency at the 1965 election, and was re-elected at each successive election until he retired from politics at the 1987 general election.

After the 1981 general election, a Fine Gael–Labour Party coalition was returned to office in the 22nd Dáil under Taoiseach Garret FitzGerald. L'Estrange was appointed Minister of State at the Department of the Taoiseach, a position which included the role of Chief Whip.

In 1973, L'Estrange was appointed a member of the second delegation from the Oireachtas to the European Parliament and re-appointed to the third delegation in 1977.

When his party was in Government and was being attacked by Fianna Fáil on the draining of the River Shannon, he is reputed to have replied "If you can suck as well as you can blow, the Shannon will be drained by teatime".

== Personal life ==
Gerry L'Estrange was born in Correaly, Street, County Westmeath the eldest of six children of farmer Patrick L'Estrange and Maud (née Byrne).

He was a noted athlete who competed on the national and local stage in long-distance running. In 1955, he married farmer's daughter Aileen Kellaghan from Ballinriddera, Multyfarnham, County Westmeath. They lived in Killintown, Multyfarnham.

Both L'Estrange and his wife were keen on greyhound racing, owning and training their own dogs.

L'Estrange died on Good Friday, 1996 after a long illness. The then Taoiseach, John Bruton, spoke of a man who "could speak strongly and from a deep conviction and at the same time hold no personal malice towards any of the victims of his eloquence". Maurice Manning recalled a man never "in bad humour or without that smile which usually meant that a practical joke or a good story was on the way".

Political offices
Preceded by Seán Moore	Government Chief Whip; Jun.–Nov. 1981	Succeeded by Fergus O'Brien
Preceded by Seán Moore	Minister of State at the Department of Defence; Jun.–Nov. 1981	Succeeded by Fergus O'Brien
Preceded by Donal Creed	Minister of State at the Department of Health; 1981–1982	Succeeded by Fergus O'Brien

Dáil	Election	Deputy (Party)	Deputy (Party)	Deputy (Party)	Deputy (Party)	Deputy (Party)
2nd	1921	Lorcan Robbins (SF)	Seán Mac Eoin (SF)	Joseph McGuinness (SF)	Laurence Ginnell (SF)	4 seats 1921–1923
3rd	1922	John Lyons (Lab)	Seán Mac Eoin (PT-SF)	Francis McGuinness (PT-SF)	Laurence Ginnell (AT-SF)	4 seats 1921–1923
4th	1923	John Lyons (Ind.)	Conor Byrne (Rep)	James Killane (Rep)	Patrick Shaw (CnaG)	Patrick McKenna (FP)
5th	1927 (Jun)	Henry Broderick (Lab)	Michael Kennedy (FF)	James Victory (FF)	Patrick Shaw (CnaG)	Hugh Garahan (FP)
6th	1927 (Sep)	Henry Broderick (Lab)	Michael Kennedy (FF)	James Killane (FF)	Patrick Shaw (CnaG)	Michael Connolly (CnaG)
6th	1930 by-election	Henry Broderick (Lab)	Michael Kennedy (FF)	James Geoghegan (FF)	Patrick Shaw (CnaG)	Michael Connolly (CnaG)
7th	1932	Francis Gormley (FF)	Michael Kennedy (FF)	James Geoghegan (FF)	Patrick Shaw (CnaG)	Seán Mac Eoin (CnaG)
8th	1933	James Victory (FF)	Michael Kennedy (FF)	James Geoghegan (FF)	Charles Fagan (NCP)	Seán Mac Eoin (CnaG)
9th	1937	Constituency abolished. See Athlone–Longford and Meath–Westmeath				

Dáil	Election	Deputy (Party)	Deputy (Party)	Deputy (Party)	Deputy (Party)	Deputy (Party)
13th	1948	Erskine H. Childers (FF)	Thomas Carter (FF)	Michael Kennedy (FF)	Seán Mac Eoin (FG)	Charles Fagan (Ind.)
14th	1951	Erskine H. Childers (FF)	Frank Carter (FF)	Michael Kennedy (FF)	Seán Mac Eoin (FG)	Charles Fagan (Ind.)
15th	1954	Erskine H. Childers (FF)	Frank Carter (FF)	Michael Kennedy (FF)	Seán Mac Eoin (FG)	Charles Fagan (FG)
16th	1957	Erskine H. Childers (FF)	Ruairí Ó Brádaigh (SF)	Michael Kennedy (FF)	Seán Mac Eoin (FG)	Charles Fagan (FG)
17th	1961	Frank Carter (FF)	Joe Sheridan (Ind.)	Michael Kennedy (FF)	Seán Mac Eoin (FG)	4 seats 1961–1992
18th	1965	Frank Carter (FF)	Joe Sheridan (Ind.)	Patrick Lenihan (FF)	Gerry L'Estrange (FG)	4 seats 1961–1992
19th	1969	Frank Carter (FF)	Joe Sheridan (Ind.)	Patrick Lenihan (FF)	Gerry L'Estrange (FG)	4 seats 1961–1992
19th	1970 by-election	Frank Carter (FF)	Joe Sheridan (Ind.)	Patrick Cooney (FG)	Gerry L'Estrange (FG)	4 seats 1961–1992
20th	1973	Frank Carter (FF)	Joe Sheridan (Ind.)	Patrick Cooney (FG)	Gerry L'Estrange (FG)	4 seats 1961–1992
21st	1977	Albert Reynolds (FF)	Joe Sheridan (Ind.)	Seán Keegan (FF)	Gerry L'Estrange (FG)	4 seats 1961–1992
22nd	1981	Albert Reynolds (FF)	Patrick Cooney (FG)	Seán Keegan (FF)	Gerry L'Estrange (FG)	4 seats 1961–1992
23rd	1982 (Feb)	Albert Reynolds (FF)	Patrick Cooney (FG)	Seán Keegan (FF)	Gerry L'Estrange (FG)	4 seats 1961–1992
24th	1982 (Nov)	Albert Reynolds (FF)	Patrick Cooney (FG)	Mary O'Rourke (FF)	Gerry L'Estrange (FG)	4 seats 1961–1992
25th	1987	Albert Reynolds (FF)	Patrick Cooney (FG)	Mary O'Rourke (FF)	Henry Abbott (FF)	4 seats 1961–1992
26th	1989	Albert Reynolds (FF)	Louis Belton (FG)	Mary O'Rourke (FF)	Paul McGrath (FG)	4 seats 1961–1992
27th	1992	Constituency abolished. See Longford–Roscommon and Westmeath				

Dáil	Election	Deputy (Party)	Deputy (Party)	Deputy (Party)	Deputy (Party)	Deputy (Party)
30th	2007	Willie Penrose (Lab)	Peter Kelly (FF)	Mary O'Rourke (FF)	James Bannon (FG)	4 seats 2007–2024
31st	2011	Willie Penrose (Lab)	Robert Troy (FF)	Nicky McFadden (FG)	James Bannon (FG)	4 seats 2007–2024
31st	2014 by-election	Willie Penrose (Lab)	Robert Troy (FF)	Gabrielle McFadden (FG)	James Bannon (FG)	4 seats 2007–2024
32nd	2016	Willie Penrose (Lab)	Robert Troy (FF)	Kevin "Boxer" Moran (Ind.)	Peter Burke (FG)	4 seats 2007–2024
33rd	2020	Sorca Clarke (SF)	Robert Troy (FF)	Joe Flaherty (FF)	Peter Burke (FG)	4 seats 2007–2024
34th	2024	Sorca Clarke (SF)	Robert Troy (FF)	Kevin "Boxer" Moran (Ind.)	Peter Burke (FG)	Micheál Carrigy (FG)
