= Jack Belton =

Irish politician (died 1963)

- Belton, c. 1948

Teachta Dála
- In office February 1948 – 23 February 1963
- Constituency: Dublin North-East

Lord Mayor of Dublin
- In office 1950–1951
- Preceded by: Cormac Breathnach
- Succeeded by: Andrew Clarkin

Personal details
- Born: Dublin, Ireland
- Died: 23 February 1963 Dublin, Ireland
- Party: Fine Gael
- Parent: Patrick Belton (father)
- Relatives: Richard Belton (brother); Paddy Belton (brother); Avril Doyle (niece)

John Belton (died 23 February 1963) was an Irish politician, builder and publican. He was first elected to Dáil Éireann as a Fine Gael Teachta Dála (TD) for the Dublin North-East constituency at the 1948 general election. He was re-elected at the 1951, 1954, 1957 and 1961 general elections.

During his youth, Belton was a rugby union prop and represented Ireland in 1946.

Belton died in office on 23 February 1963, and the by-election held on 30 May 1963 was won by his brother Paddy Belton. He served as Lord Mayor of Dublin from 1950 to 1951.

Other members of the Belton family to have served in the Oireachtas include his father Patrick Belton, his brother Richard Belton and his niece Avril Doyle.

== See also ==
- Families in the Oireachtas

Civic offices
| Preceded by Cormac Breathnach | Lord Mayor of Dublin; 1950–1951 | Succeeded by Andrew Clarkin |

| Dáil | Election | Deputy (Party) | Deputy (Party) | Deputy (Party) | Deputy (Party) | Deputy (Party) |
|---|---|---|---|---|---|---|
| 9th | 1937 | Alfie Byrne (Ind.) | Oscar Traynor (FF) | James Larkin (Ind.) | 3 seats 1937–1948 | |
| 10th | 1938 | Alfie Byrne (Ind.) | Oscar Traynor (FF) | Richard Mulcahy (FG) | 3 seats 1937–1948 | |
| 11th | 1943 | Alfie Byrne (Ind.) | Oscar Traynor (FF) | James Larkin (Lab) | 3 seats 1937–1948 | |
| 12th | 1944 | Alfie Byrne (Ind.) | Oscar Traynor (FF) | Harry Colley (FF) | 3 seats 1937–1948 | |
| 13th | 1948 | Alfie Byrne (Ind.) | Oscar Traynor (FF) | Harry Colley (FF) | Jack Belton (FG) | Peadar Cowan (CnaP) |
| 14th | 1951 | Alfie Byrne (Ind.) | Oscar Traynor (FF) | Harry Colley (FF) | Jack Belton (FG) | Peadar Cowan (Ind.) |
| 15th | 1954 | Alfie Byrne (Ind.) | Oscar Traynor (FF) | Harry Colley (FF) | Jack Belton (FG) | Denis Larkin (Lab) |
| 15th | 1956 by-election | Patrick Byrne (FG) | Oscar Traynor (FF) | Harry Colley (FF) | Jack Belton (FG) | Denis Larkin (Lab) |
| 16th | 1957 | Patrick Byrne (FG) | Oscar Traynor (FF) | Charles Haughey (FF) | Jack Belton (FG) | Denis Larkin (Lab) |
| 17th | 1961 | Patrick Byrne (FG) | George Colley (FF) | Charles Haughey (FF) | Jack Belton (FG) | Eugene Timmons (FF) |
| 17th | 1963 by-election | Patrick Byrne (FG) | George Colley (FF) | Charles Haughey (FF) | Paddy Belton (FG) | Eugene Timmons (FF) |
| 18th | 1965 | Patrick Byrne (FG) | George Colley (FF) | Charles Haughey (FF) | Paddy Belton (FG) | Denis Larkin (Lab) |
| 19th | 1969 | Conor Cruise O'Brien (Lab) | Eugene Timmons (FF) | Charles Haughey (FF) | Paddy Belton (FG) | 4 seats 1969–1977 |
| 20th | 1973 | Conor Cruise O'Brien (Lab) | Eugene Timmons (FF) | Charles Haughey (FF) | Paddy Belton (FG) | 4 seats 1969–1977 |
| 21st | 1977 | Constituency abolished | | | | |

| Dáil | Election | Deputy (Party) | Deputy (Party) | Deputy (Party) | Deputy (Party) |
|---|---|---|---|---|---|
| 22nd | 1981 | Michael Woods (FF) | Liam Fitzgerald (FF) | Seán Dublin Bay Rockall Loftus (Ind.) | Michael Joe Cosgrave (FG) |
| 23rd | 1982 (Feb) | Michael Woods (FF) | Maurice Manning (FG) | Ned Brennan (FF) | Michael Joe Cosgrave (FG) |
| 24th | 1982 (Nov) | Michael Woods (FF) | Maurice Manning (FG) | Liam Fitzgerald (FF) | Michael Joe Cosgrave (FG) |
| 25th | 1987 | Michael Woods (FF) | Pat McCartan (WP) | Liam Fitzgerald (FF) | Michael Joe Cosgrave (FG) |
| 26th | 1989 | Michael Woods (FF) | Pat McCartan (WP) | Liam Fitzgerald (FF) | Michael Joe Cosgrave (FG) |
| 27th | 1992 | Michael Woods (FF) | Tommy Broughan (Lab) | Liam Fitzgerald (FF) | Seán Kenny (Lab) |
| 28th | 1997 | Michael Woods (FF) | Tommy Broughan (Lab) | Martin Brady (FF) | Michael Joe Cosgrave (FG) |
| 29th | 2002 | Michael Woods (FF) | Tommy Broughan (Lab) | Martin Brady (FF) | 3 seats from 2002 |
| 30th | 2007 | Michael Woods (FF) | Tommy Broughan (Lab) | Terence Flanagan (FG) | 3 seats from 2002 |
| 31st | 2011 | Seán Kenny (Lab) | Tommy Broughan (Lab) | Terence Flanagan (FG) | 3 seats from 2002 |
| 32nd | 2016 | Constituency abolished. See Dublin Bay North | | | |
