= Minister of State at the Department of the Taoiseach =

Junior ministerial post in the government of Ireland

Government Chief Whip
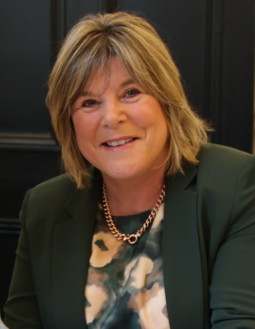
- Incumbent; Mary Butler since 23 January 2025
- Appointer: Taoiseach
- Inaugural holder: Daniel McCarthy (as Parliamentary Secretary to the President)
- Formation: 6 December 1922
- Deputy: Emer Currie

The minister of state at the Department of the Taoiseach is a junior ministerial post in the Department of the Taoiseach of the Government of Ireland who performs duties and functions delegated by the Taoiseach.

The position was first created in 1922 as Parliamentary secretary to the President of the Executive Council. In 1937, following the adoption of the Constitution of Ireland, the position was changed to that of Parliamentary Secretary to the Taoiseach. In 1978, the position was superseded by the office of Minister of State at the Department of the Taoiseach.

One of the Ministers of State in this department is assigned the role of Government Chief Whip and is the most senior minister of state in the government of Ireland. They attend cabinet meetings, but do not have a vote and are not one of fifteen members of the government. The role of the Whip is primarily that of the disciplinarian for all government parties, to ensure that all deputies, including ministers, attend for Dáil Business and follow the government line on all issues.

The incumbent government chief whip is Mary Butler, TD, and the deputy chief whip is Emer Currie.

== Responsibilities of Government Chief Whip ==
The main responsibilities of the Chief Whip include:

=== Attendance at Government meetings ===
The Chief Whip is a Minister of State who attends Government meetings, but does not have a vote. The title is sometimes given as "Minister of State, attending Government". Other Ministers of state with the title "Minister of State, attending Government" are commonly known as super junior ministers.

=== Preparation of weekly brief for Taoiseach on legislation in preparation ===
Before each Dáil Session letters are sent to all Ministers to see what legislation or other business their department expects to place before the Dáil. A weekly report on what stage Bills are at is given to the Taoiseach. During the Order of Business the Taoiseach is often queried about what legislation is promised. The weekly report shows what Bills are promised and gives an expected date of publication of the Bill.

=== Scheduling and monitoring of Dáil business ===
Once a bill has been published and is placed on the Dáil Order Paper the staff in the Whip's office keep in touch with Minister's Private Secretaries about when they wish to have their bill taken in the Dáil - sometimes the Whip's office have to insist that a bill is taken on a certain day, particularly when there is not much business for the House. Every Wednesday the Private Secretary prepares an agenda (called a schedule - see example) for each sitting day of the following week. This is discussed at a meeting of the Dáil Business Committee, which includes the whips of the major parties, including the government (Fianna Fáil) chief whip; Fine Gael whip; Sinn Féin whip and Labour Party whip.

=== Operation of the pairing system ===
A pair is an arrangement whereby a Government Deputy's name is linked with an Opposition Deputy in the event of a Vote arising. The practice is that under such an arrangement neither Deputy votes in any Division arising while the pairing agreement is valid. Because it is obviously so important for the Government to maintain its majority in the Dáil Chamber the pairing arrangements must be attended to very carefully. If a member cannot attend a notice explaining their absence must be sent to the Chief Whip as early as possible.

=== Leinster House accommodation for political parties ===
The minister has to ensure that facilities and services in Leinster House are satisfactory for members and staff. The Opposition Whips liaise with him on matters such as office equipment which they may require.

=== Chairing Legislation Committee ===
The Chief Whip chairs the weekly meeting of the Legislation Committee. This Committee meets to discuss the progress of Bills in Departments and tries to ensure that there is always enough business for the Dáil and Seanad. The meeting is attended by the Attorney General, a Parliamentary Draftsman, Programme Manager to the Taoiseach, Programme Manager to the Tánaiste, Principal Officer in this Department (who looks after legislation) and the Chief Whip.

== List of government chief whips ==
=== Parliamentary Secretary to the President 1922–1937 ===
| Name | Term of office | | Party | Executive Council |
| Daniel McCarthy | 6 December 1922 | 31 March 1924 | Cumann na nGaedheal | 1st • 2nd |
| James Dolan | 19 June 1924 | 24 June 1927 | Cumann na nGaedheal | 2nd |
| Eamonn Duggan | 24 June 1927 | 9 March 1932 | Cumann na nGaedheal | 3rd • 4th • 5th |
| Gerald Boland | 9 March 1932 | 7 February 1933 | Fianna Fáil | 6th |
| Patrick Little | 8 February 1933 | 29 December 1937 | Fianna Fáil | 7th • 8th |
=== Parliamentary Secretary to the Taoiseach 1937–1977 ===
| Name | Term of office | | Party | Government |
| Patrick Little | 29 December 1937 | 26 September 1939 | Fianna Fáil | 1st • 2nd |
| Paddy Smith | 27 September 1939 | 2 July 1943 | Fianna Fáil | 2nd |
| Eamon Kissane | 2 July 1943 | 18 February 1948 | Fianna Fáil | 3rd • 4th |
| Liam Cosgrave | 18 February 1948 | 13 June 1951 | Fine Gael | 5th |
| Donnchadh Ó Briain | 13 June 1951 | 2 June 1954 | Fianna Fáil | 6th |
| Denis J. O'Sullivan | 2 June 1954 | 20 March 1957 | Fine Gael | 7th |
| Donnchadh Ó Briain | 20 March 1957 | 11 October 1961 | Fianna Fáil | 8th • 9th |
| Joseph Brennan | 11 October 1961 | 21 April 1965 | Fianna Fáil | 10th |
| Michael Carty | 21 April 1965 | 2 July 1969 | Fianna Fáil | 11th • 12th |
| Desmond O'Malley | 2 July 1969 | 7 May 1970 | Fianna Fáil | 13th |
| David Andrews | 8 May 1970 | 14 March 1973 | Fianna Fáil | 13th |
| John M. Kelly | 14 March 1973 | 20 May 1977 | Fine Gael | 14th |
| Patrick Lalor | 5 July 1977 | 1 January 1978 | Fianna Fáil | 15th |
=== Ministers of State at the Department of the Taoiseach 1978–present ===
| Name | Term of office | | Party | Government |
| Patrick Lalor | 1 January 1978 | 1 July 1979 | Fianna Fáil | 15th |
| Michael Woods | 1 July 1979 | 11 December 1979 | Fianna Fáil | 15th |
| Seán Moore | 13 December 1979 | 30 June 1981 | Fianna Fáil | 16th |
| Gerry L'Estrange | 30 June 1981 | 11 November 1981 | Fine Gael | 17th |
| Fergus O'Brien | 11 November 1981 | 9 March 1982 | Fine Gael | 17th |
| Bertie Ahern | 9 March 1982 | 14 December 1982 | Fianna Fáil | 18th |
| Seán Barrett | 14 December 1982 | 13 February 1986 | Fine Gael | 19th |
| Fergus O'Brien | 13 February 1986 | 10 March 1987 | Fine Gael | 19th |
| Vincent Brady | 10 March 1987 | 14 November 1991 | Fianna Fáil | 20th • 21st |
| Dermot Ahern | 15 November 1991 | 11 February 1992 | Fianna Fáil | 21st |
| Noel Dempsey | 11 February 1992 | 15 December 1994 | Fianna Fáil | 22nd • 23rd |
| Seán Barrett | 15 December 1994 | 23 May 1995 | Fine Gael | 24th |
| Jim Higgins | 24 May 1995 | 26 June 1997 | Fine Gael | 24th |
| Séamus Brennan | 26 June 1997 | 6 June 2002 | Fianna Fáil | 25th |
| Mary Hanafin | 6 June 2002 | 29 September 2004 | Fianna Fáil | 26th |
| Tom Kitt | 29 September 2004 | 7 May 2008 | Fianna Fáil | 26th • 27th |
| Pat Carey | 7 May 2008 | 23 March 2010 | Fianna Fáil | 28th |
| John Curran | 23 March 2010 | 9 March 2011 | Fianna Fáil | 28th |
| Paul Kehoe | 9 March 2011 | 6 May 2016 | Fine Gael | 29th |
| Regina Doherty | 6 May 2016 | 14 June 2017 | Fine Gael | 30th |
| Joe McHugh | 14 June 2017 | 16 October 2018 | Fine Gael | 31st |
| Seán Kyne | 16 October 2018 | 27 June 2020 | Fine Gael | 31st |
| Dara Calleary | 27 June 2020 | 15 July 2020 | Fianna Fáil | 32nd |
| Jack Chambers | 15 July 2020 | 17 December 2022 | Fianna Fáil | 32nd |
| Hildegarde Naughton | 17 December 2022 | 23 January 2025 | Fine Gael | 33rd • 34th |
| Mary Butler | 23 January 2025 | Incumbent | Fianna Fáil | 35th |

== Other ministers of state at the Department of the Taoiseach 1986–present ==
| Name | Term of office | | Party | Responsibility | Government |
|---|---|---|---|---|---|
| Seán Barrett | 13 February 1986 | 10 March 1987 | Fine Gael | Dáil Reform | 19th |
| Nuala Fennell | 16 December 1982 | 10 March 1987 | Fine Gael | Women's Affairs and Family Law Reform | 19th |
| Ted Nealon | 16 December 1982 | 10 March 1987 | Fine Gael | Arts and Culture | 19th |
| Máire Geoghegan-Quinn | 12 March 1987 | 12 July 1989 | Fianna Fáil | Co-ordination of Government policy and EC matters | 20th |
| Máire Geoghegan-Quinn | 19 July 1989 | 15 November 1991 | Fianna Fáil | Co-ordination of Government policy and EC matters | 21st |
| Noel Treacy | 30 June 1988 | 12 July 1989 | Fianna Fáil | Heritage | 20th |
| Brendan Daly | 19 July 1989 | 11 February 1992 | Fianna Fáil | Heritage | 21st |
| Michael P. Kitt | 15 November 1991 | 11 February 1992 | Fianna Fáil | Co-ordination of Government policy and EC matters | 21st |
| Tom Kitt | 13 February 1992 | 12 January 1993 | Fianna Fáil | Arts and culture, Women's affairs and European affairs | 22nd |
| Tom Kitt | 14 January 1993 | 15 December 1994 | Fianna Fáil | European affairs | 23rd |
| Noel Treacy | 14 January 1993 | 15 December 1994 | Fianna Fáil | | 23rd |
| Gay Mitchell | 20 December 1994 | 26 June 1997 | Fine Gael | European affairs | 24th |
| Avril Doyle | 27 January 1995 | 26 June 1997 | Fine Gael | Consumers of Public Services | 24th |
| Donal Carey | 27 January 1995 | 26 June 1997 | Fine Gael | Western Development and Rural Renewal | 24th |
| Dick Roche | 19 June 2002 | 29 September 2004 | Fianna Fáil | European Affairs | 26th |
| Noel Treacy | 29 September 2004 | 20 June 2007 | Fianna Fáil | European Affairs | 26th |
| Dick Roche | 14 June 2007 | 9 March 2011 | Fianna Fáil | European Affairs | 27th • 28th |
| Dara Calleary | 23 March 2010 | 9 March 2011 | Fianna Fáil | Public service transformation | 28th |
| Lucinda Creighton | 10 March 2011 | 11 July 2013 | Fine Gael | European Affairs | 29th |
| Paschal Donohoe | 12 July 2013 | 11 July 2014 | Fine Gael | European Affairs | 29th |
| Jimmy Deenihan | 15 July 2014 | 6 May 2016 | Fine Gael | Diaspora | 29th |
| Simon Harris | 15 July 2014 | 6 May 2016 | Fine Gael | | 29th |
| Dara Murphy | 15 July 2014 | 20 June 2017 | Fine Gael | European Affairs and Data protection | 29th • 30th |
| Joe McHugh | 19 May 2016 | 16 June 2017 | Fine Gael | Diaspora | 30th |
| Paul Kehoe | 6 May 2016 | 14 June 2017 | Fine Gael | | 30th • 31st |
| Helen McEntee | 20 June 2017 | 27 June 2020 | Fine Gael | European Affairs | 31st |
| Pat Breen | 20 June 2017 | 27 June 2020 | Fine Gael | Data protection | 31st |
| Thomas Byrne | 1 July 2020 | 21 December 2022 | Fianna Fáil | European Affairs | 32nd |
| Peter Burke | 21 December 2022 | 9 April 2024 | Fine Gael | European Affairs | 33rd |
| Jennifer Carroll MacNeill | 10 April 2024 | 23 January 2025 | Fine Gael | European Affairs | 34th |
| Thomas Byrne | 29 January 2025 | Incumbent | Fianna Fáil | European Affairs | 35th |
