= Ep Wieldraaijer =

Dutch politician

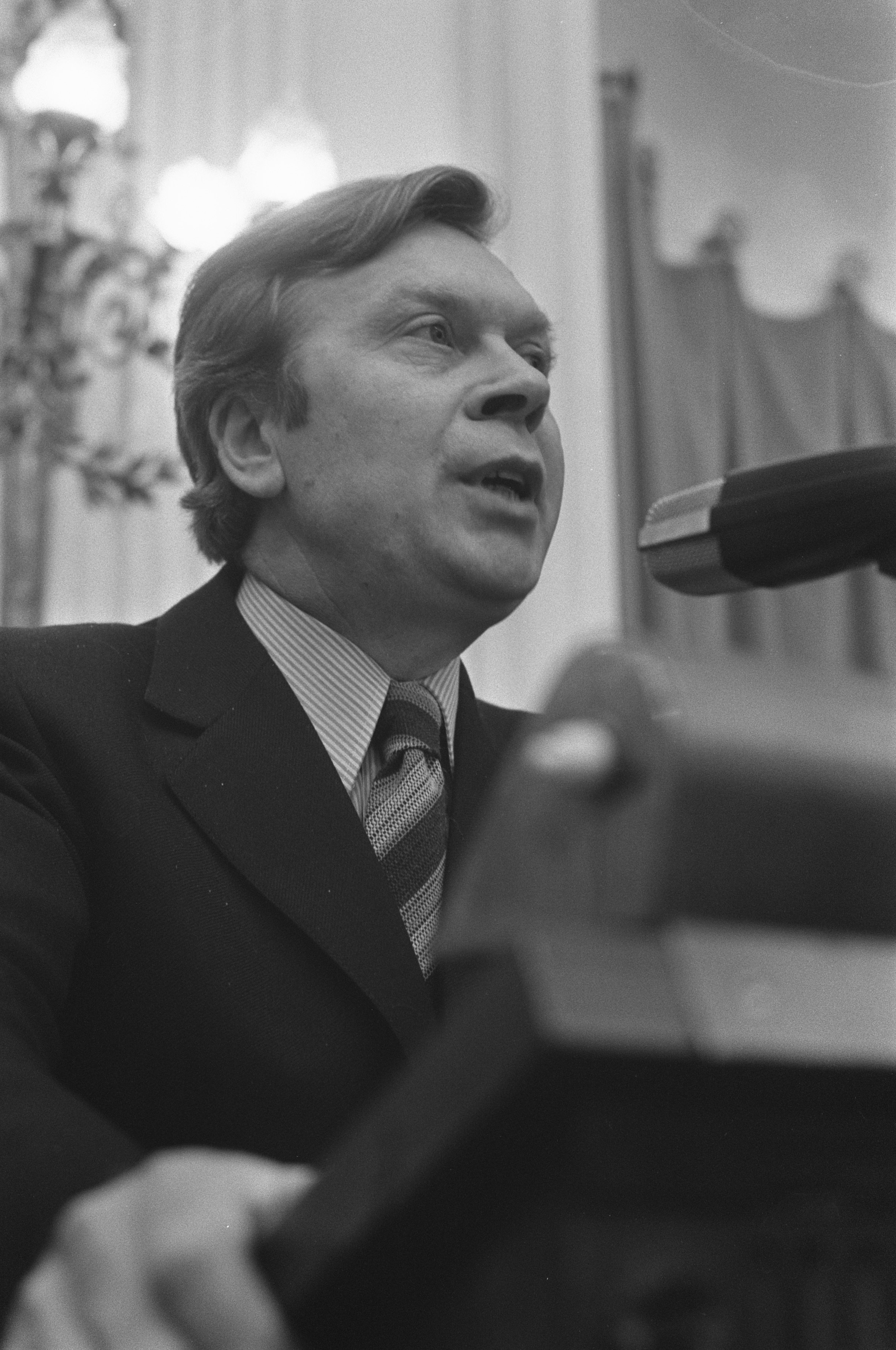
Wieldraaijer in April 1972

Egbert Roelof "Ep" Wieldraaijer (31 March 1927 – 16 February 2017) was a Dutch politician. A member of the Labour Party, he served in the House of Representatives from 1963 to 1974. During this term, he also served as a member of the European Parliament for the Netherlands from 1973 to 1974. Beginning in 1978, Wieldraaijer served a ten-year term as the Mayor of Avereest. He was born in Borne, Overijssel.

Wieldraaijer died on 16 February 2017 in Enschede, at the age of 89.
