= 1963 Dublin North-East by-election =

By-election to the 17th Dáil

- 30 May 1963
- Turnout: 39,285 (57.3%)
	Belton	O'Brien	Larkin
Nominee	Paddy Belton	Stan O'Brien	Denis Larkin
Party	Fine Gael	Fianna Fáil	Labour
First preferences	16,357	13,132	7,270
Percentage	41.6%	33.4%	18.5%
Final count	21,956	15,358	–
TD before election
Jack Belton
Fine Gael
TD after election
Paddy Belton
Fine Gael

A Dáil by-election was held in the constituency of Dublin North-East in Ireland on Thursday, 30 May 1963, to fill a vacancy in the 17th Dáil. It followed the death of Fine Gael Teachta Dála (TD) Jack Belton on 23 February 1963.

The writ of election to fill the vacancy was agreed by the Dáil on 7 May 1963.

The by-election was won by the Fine Gael candidate Paddy Belton, brother of the deceased TD, Jack Belton.

== Result ==
1963 Dublin North-East by-election
Party	Candidate	FPv%	Count		
Party	Candidate	FPv%	1	2	3
Fine Gael	Paddy Belton	41.6	16,357	17,252	21,956
Fianna Fáil	Stan O'Brien	33.4	13,132	13,652	15,358
Labour	Denis Larkin	18.5	7,270	8,071	
Independent	Seán D. Loftus	6.4	2,526		
Electorate: 68,573 Valid: 39,285 Quota: 19,643 Turnout: 57.3%
