= William Cumiskey =

Irish politician

Lord Mayor of Dublin
- In office 1979–1980
- Preceded by: Paddy Belton
- Succeeded by: Fergus O'Brien

Personal details
- Born: Dublin, Ireland
- Party: Labour Party

William Cumiskey was an Irish Labour Party politician.

He was a member of Dublin City Council for the North Inner City electoral area from 1967 to 1985. Cumiskey held the office of Lord Mayor of Dublin from 18 June 1979 to the end of June 1980.

When he was elected mayor, he won 27 votes against Eugene Timmons, who received 13 votes, and Seán Dublin Bay Rockall Loftus, who received 4 votes.

He stood unsuccessfully as a Labour Party candidate at the 1969 general election for Dublin North-Central. He was also unsuccessful at the 1973 general election for the same constituency.

Civic offices
Preceded by Paddy Belton	Lord Mayor of Dublin; 1979–1980	Succeeded by Fergus O'Brien
