= Paddy Belton =

Irish politician (1926–1987)

Teachta Dála
- In office May 1963 – June 1977
- Constituency: Dublin North-East

Lord Mayor of Dublin
- In office 1978–1979
- Preceded by: Michael Collins
- Succeeded by: William Cumiskey

Personal details
- Born: 26 June 1926 Dublin, Ireland
- Died: 22 May 1987 (aged 60) Dublin, Ireland
- Party: Fine Gael
- Spouse: Elizabeth Cassidy (m. 1957)
- Children: 6
- Parent: Patrick Belton (father)
- Relatives: Richard Belton (brother); Jack Belton (brother); Avril Doyle (niece)
- Education: Belvedere College

Patrick Belton (26 June 1926 – 22 May 1987) was an Irish politician, company director and publican.

He was born on 26 June 1926 at 5 Mount Street Crescent, Dublin, the third of four sons of Patrick Belton and his wife Mary (née Fitzgibbon). He was first elected to Dáil Éireann as a Fine Gael Teachta Dála (TD) at the Dublin North-East by-election held on 30 May 1963 caused by the death of his brother Jack Belton. He was re-elected for Dublin North-East at the 1965, 1969 and 1973 general elections. He lost his seat at the 1977 general election. He served as Lord Mayor of Dublin from 1978 to 1979.

Other members of the Belton family to have served in the Oireachtas include his father Patrick Belton, his brothers Richard Belton and Jack Belton; and his niece Avril Doyle.

== See also ==
- Families in the Oireachtas

Civic offices
Preceded by Michael Collins	Lord Mayor of Dublin; 1978–1979	Succeeded by William Cumiskey

Dáil	Election	Deputy (Party)	Deputy (Party)	Deputy (Party)	Deputy (Party)	Deputy (Party)
9th	1937	Alfie Byrne (Ind)	Oscar Traynor (FF)	James Larkin (Ind)	3 seats 1937–1948	
10th	1938	Alfie Byrne (Ind)	Oscar Traynor (FF)	Richard Mulcahy (FG)	3 seats 1937–1948	
11th	1943	Alfie Byrne (Ind)	Oscar Traynor (FF)	James Larkin (Lab)	3 seats 1937–1948	
12th	1944	Alfie Byrne (Ind)	Oscar Traynor (FF)	Harry Colley (FF)	3 seats 1937–1948	
13th	1948	Alfie Byrne (Ind)	Oscar Traynor (FF)	Harry Colley (FF)	Jack Belton (FG)	Peadar Cowan (CnaP)
14th	1951	Alfie Byrne (Ind)	Oscar Traynor (FF)	Harry Colley (FF)	Jack Belton (FG)	Peadar Cowan (Ind)
15th	1954	Alfie Byrne (Ind)	Oscar Traynor (FF)	Harry Colley (FF)	Jack Belton (FG)	Denis Larkin (Lab)
15th	1956 by-election	Patrick Byrne (FG)	Oscar Traynor (FF)	Harry Colley (FF)	Jack Belton (FG)	Denis Larkin (Lab)
16th	1957	Patrick Byrne (FG)	Oscar Traynor (FF)	Charles Haughey (FF)	Jack Belton (FG)	Denis Larkin (Lab)
17th	1961	Patrick Byrne (FG)	George Colley (FF)	Charles Haughey (FF)	Jack Belton (FG)	Eugene Timmons (FF)
17th	1963 by-election	Patrick Byrne (FG)	George Colley (FF)	Charles Haughey (FF)	Paddy Belton (FG)	Eugene Timmons (FF)
18th	1965	Patrick Byrne (FG)	George Colley (FF)	Charles Haughey (FF)	Paddy Belton (FG)	Denis Larkin (Lab)
19th	1969	Conor Cruise O'Brien (Lab)	Eugene Timmons (FF)	Charles Haughey (FF)	Paddy Belton (FG)	4 seats 1969–1977
20th	1973	Conor Cruise O'Brien (Lab)	Eugene Timmons (FF)	Charles Haughey (FF)	Paddy Belton (FG)	4 seats 1969–1977
21st	1977	Constituency abolished				

Dáil	Election	Deputy (Party)	Deputy (Party)	Deputy (Party)	Deputy (Party)
22nd	1981	Michael Woods (FF)	Liam Fitzgerald (FF)	Seán Dublin Bay Rockall Loftus (Ind)	Michael Joe Cosgrave (FG)
23rd	1982 (Feb)	Michael Woods (FF)	Maurice Manning (FG)	Ned Brennan (FF)	Michael Joe Cosgrave (FG)
24th	1982 (Nov)	Michael Woods (FF)	Maurice Manning (FG)	Liam Fitzgerald (FF)	Michael Joe Cosgrave (FG)
25th	1987	Michael Woods (FF)	Pat McCartan (WP)	Liam Fitzgerald (FF)	Michael Joe Cosgrave (FG)
26th	1989	Michael Woods (FF)	Pat McCartan (WP)	Liam Fitzgerald (FF)	Michael Joe Cosgrave (FG)
27th	1992	Michael Woods (FF)	Tommy Broughan (Lab)	Liam Fitzgerald (FF)	Seán Kenny (Lab)
28th	1997	Michael Woods (FF)	Tommy Broughan (Lab)	Martin Brady (FF)	Michael Joe Cosgrave (FG)
29th	2002	Michael Woods (FF)	Tommy Broughan (Lab)	Martin Brady (FF)	3 seats from 2002
30th	2007	Michael Woods (FF)	Tommy Broughan (Lab)	Terence Flanagan (FG)	3 seats from 2002
31st	2011	Seán Kenny (Lab)	Tommy Broughan (Lab)	Terence Flanagan (FG)	3 seats from 2002
32nd	2016	Constituency abolished. See Dublin Bay North			
