= List of members of the European Parliament for Ireland, 1973–1977 =

This is a list of the 10 members of the European Parliament for Ireland appointed to the delegation from the Oireachtas following the 1973 general election. The second delegation served from March 1973 until the 1977 general election.

Name	National party	National office
Donal Creed	Fine Gael	Teachta Dála
Thomas Dunne	Fine Gael	Teachta Dála
Jim Gibbons	Fianna Fáil	Teachta Dála
Michael Herbert	Fianna Fáil	Teachta Dála
Liam Kavanagh	Labour	Teachta Dála
Brian Lenihan	Fianna Fáil	Teachta Dála
Gerry L'Estrange	Fine Gael	Teachta Dála
Charles McDonald	Fine Gael	Senator
Tom Nolan	Fianna Fáil	Teachta Dála
Michael Yeats	Fianna Fáil	Senator

== See also ==
- Members of the European Parliament (1958–1979) – List by country
