= Ronald Mason Jr. =

American lawyer (born 1953)

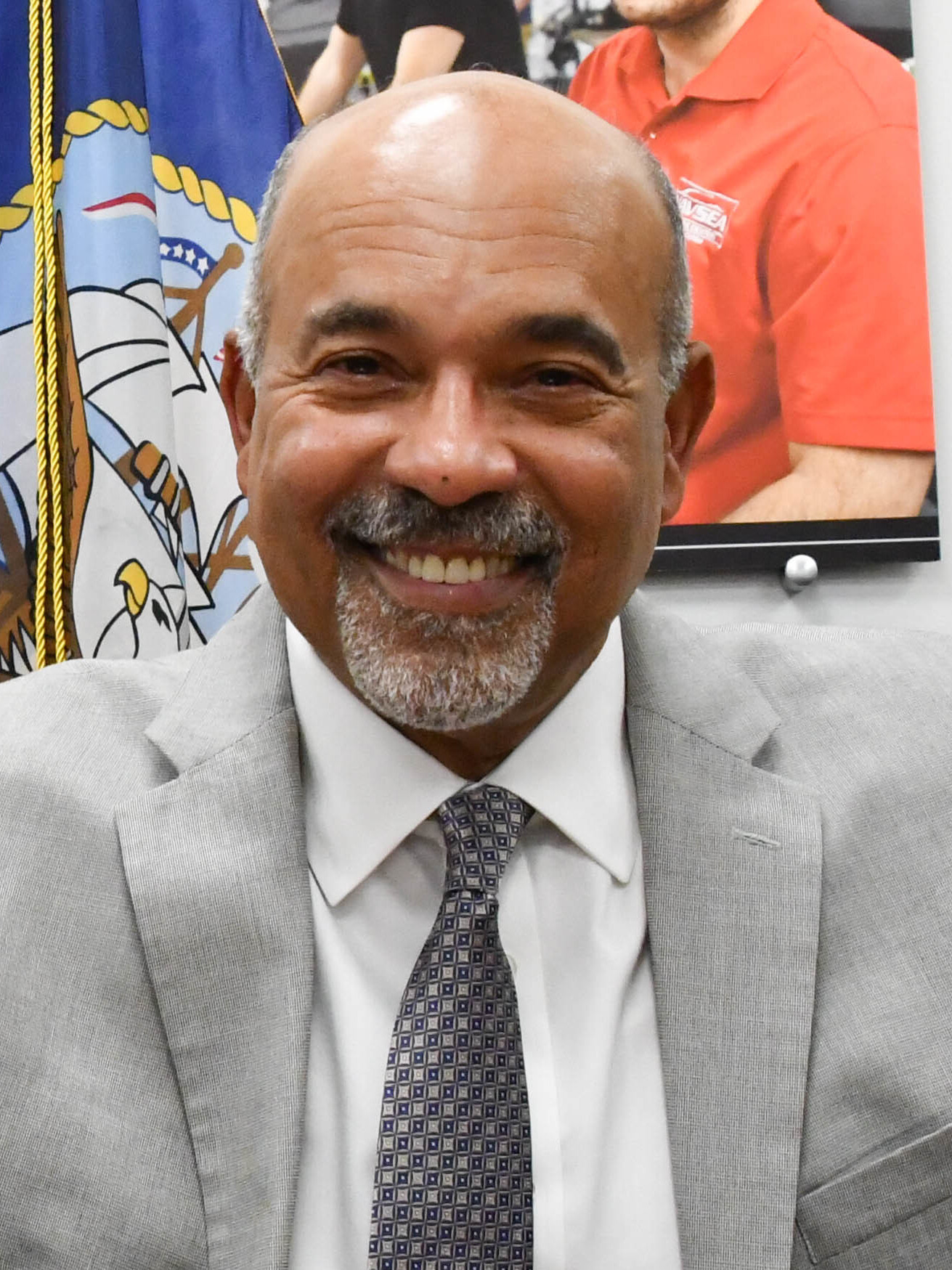

Former President of University of the District of Columbia
- In office 2015–2023
- Succeeded by: Maurice D. Edington

President of Southern University
- In office 2010–2015
- Preceded by: Ralph Slaughter
- Succeeded by: Ray Belton

Personal details
- Born: January 15, 1953 (age 73) New Orleans, Louisiana, U.S.
- Education: Columbia University
- Profession: Academic administrator

Ronald Francis Mason Jr. (born January 15, 1953) is an American lawyer and university administrator, serving as the ninth president of the University of the District of Columbia (UDC). He took office in July 2015. This was Mason's third presidential appointment. He was previously chief executive officer at the Southern University System of Louisiana (2010–2015) and Jackson State University (2000–2010). Before his administration at Jackson State, Mason held several executive appointments over a 17-year tenure at Tulane University, including general counsel, vice president for Finance and Operations and senior vice president and general counsel.

== Early life ==
Mason was born the eldest of six children in Los Angeles, California, on January 15, 1953. He grew up in New Orleans, Louisiana, where his family has lived for at least six generations.

== Education ==
Mason graduated from Columbia College of Columbia University, where he earned a bachelor's degree in 1974, followed by his Juris Doctor degree from Columbia Law School in 1977.

== Career ==
After law school, Mason returned to his home state to begin his career as house counsel at the Southern Cooperative Development Fund (SCDF) in Lafayette, Louisiana, headed by Rev. A.J. McKnight. As the finance arm of the Federation of Southern Cooperatives, SCDF organized and financed limited equity cooperatives across 17 southern states. In 1980, Mason resigned from his position at SCDF, and was unanimously elected by the member cooperatives to serve on the SCDF Board of Directors.

In 1982, Mason became the first in-house counsel for Tulane University under president Dr. Eamon Kelly. The first African American appointed to senior administration at Tulane, Mason eventually became the senior vice president and general counsel, responsible for the business operations and legal affairs of (at the time) the largest employer in the City of New Orleans. Mason's leadership contributed to the transformative nature of Kelly's administration at Tulane. The New Orleans Times-Picayune wrote that Mason "brought a kind of corporate model to the job of running the business end of the school [Tulane]."

In addition to serving as principal legal adviser to the president, senior officers, academic deans, and the administrative board of the Tulane Educational Fund, he played a significant role in bringing the Amistad Research Center—one of the largest collections of manuscripts, documents, and artwork relating to the experiences of African Americans and other minorities—to the university. He also served as principal investigator on a Ford Foundation grant to explore the issue of racism in higher education.

In 1996, Mason negotiated a deal between Marc Morial, then mayor of New Orleans, and Henry Cisneros, then U.S. Secretary of Housing and Urban Development, for Tulane University to assume management oversight of the Housing Authority of New Orleans (HANO), known at the time as the worse public housing authority in the nation. Over four years, from 1996 to 2000, Mason sat as the federal Executive Monitor, a one-person Board of Directors of HANO, while simultaneously serving as senior vice president of Tulane from 1996 to 1998. In addition to helping to improve HANO, Mason also started the innovative Campus Affiliates Program assigning Tulane students and faculty to work with public housing residents.

In 1998, Mason took a leave from his position as senior vice president and general counsel at Tulane to establish the Tulane-Xavier National Center for the Urban Community (NCUC). NCUC was a partnership between Tulane and Xavier Universities to work with low-income residents of New Orleans.

Mason was appointed by the Board of Trustees of State Institutions of Higher Learning (IHL) as Jackson State University's president in February 2000. In 2010, he was appointed by President Barack Obama to serve on the President's Board of Advisors on Historically Black Colleges and Universities.

He served as the President of the Southern University and A&M College System from 2010 to 2015. Mason guided the Southern System, the only HBCU system in the nation, through financial exigency and an organizational restructuring that combined the offices of the president and the chancellor of the main campus in Baton Rouge.

While at Southern, Mason created a national initiative called the 'Five-Fifths Agenda for America', which focused on reclaiming and developing Black male human capital. The focal points of the initiative were Centers for Undergraduate Student Achievement, designed to break the cycle of violence and the school-to-prison pipeline that characterized the coming of age for many young men in New Orleans at that time. The first such center was piloted at Southern University New Orleans with the support of the State of Louisiana and several foundations.

In July 2015, Mason became the ninth president of the University of the District of Columbia (UDC) in July 2015. He is currently the longest-serving president in the school's history. He has championed a platform for strengthening and promoting UDC's exceptional status as the only public university in the nation's capital and the only exclusively urban land-grant university. Under Mason's leadership, the university expanded its information technology infrastructure and launched specific initiatives to build UDC's brand among DC Public Schools, its primary feeder institutions. In 2021 the university received its most significant financial gift of $2.3M from an anonymous donor in support of its strategic plan, the Equity Imperative. On July 21, 2022, Mason announced that the 2022–2033 academic year would be his final year as president and that he would be stepping down at the end of his contract on June 30, 2023.

Mason serves on the boards of the Thurgood Marshall College Fund and the President's Board of Advisors (PBA) on HBCUs of the White House Initiative on Historically Black Colleges and Universities. Mason is also the vice-chair of the Consortium of Universities of the Washington Metropolitan Area.

== Awards ==
1999: Tulane/3Xavier/Loyola Lifetime Achievement Award

2000: City of New Orleans Medal of Honor

2008: Columbia University John Jay Award for Distinguished Professional Achievement

2008: TMCF Educator of the Year

2009: Benjamin E. Mays Educator of the Year

2013: Southern Christian Leadership Conference Award for Educational Leadership
