= Michael Herbert =

Irish politician and hurler (1925–2006)

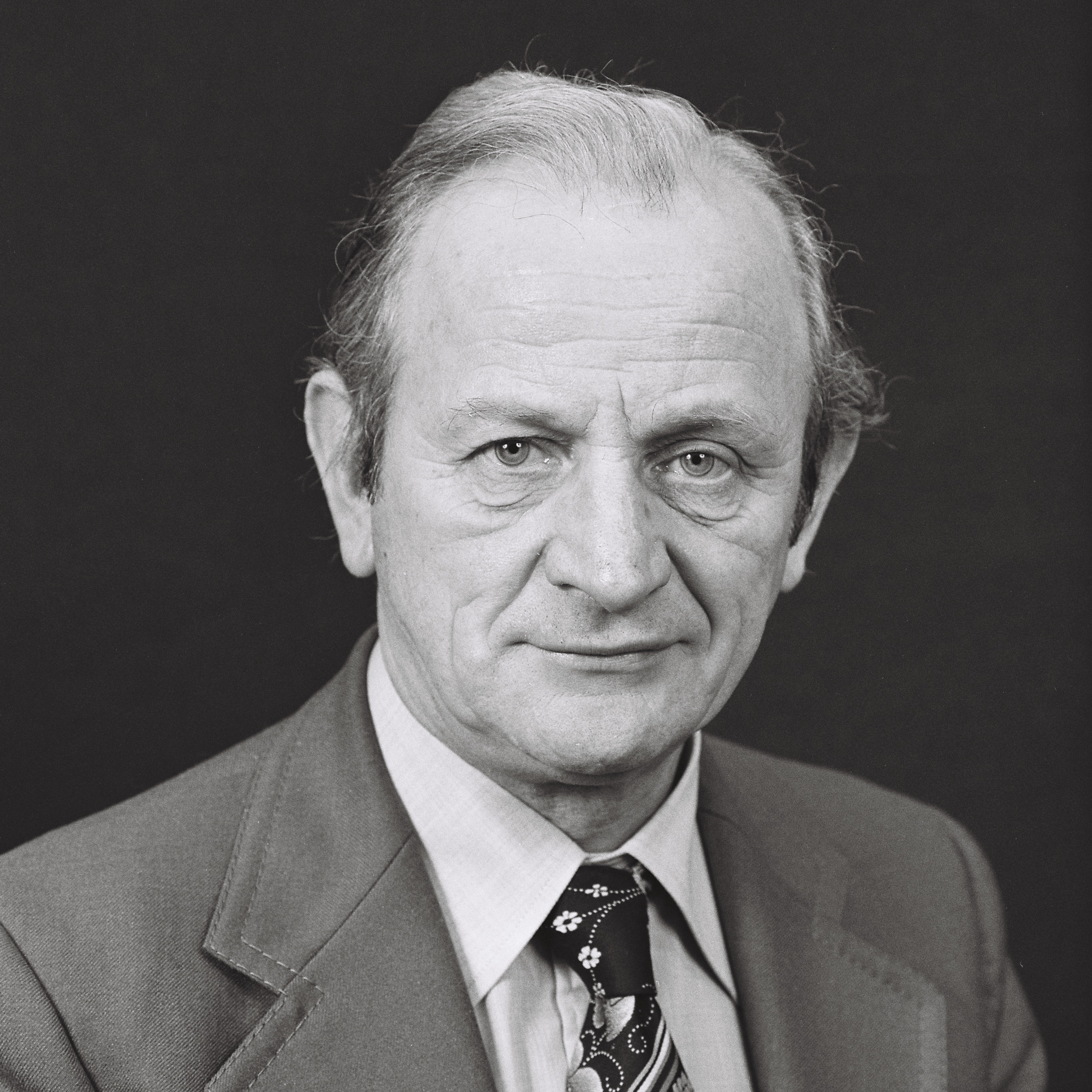

Teachta Dála
- In office June 1969 – June 1981
- Constituency: Limerick East

Member of the European Parliament
- In office January 1973 – June 1979
- Constituency: Oireachtas Delegation

Personal details
- Born: 17 May 1925 Castleconnell, County Limerick, Ireland
- Died: 20 June 2006 (aged 81) County Limerick, Ireland
- Party: Fianna Fáil

Michael Herbert (17 May 1925 – 20 June 2006) was an Irish Fianna Fáil politician.

== Career ==
A publican from Castleconnell, County Limerick, he unsuccessfully contested the 1965 general election and was first elected to Dáil Éireann at the 1969 general election as a Fianna Fáil Teachta Dála (TD) for the Limerick East constituency. He was re-elected for the constituency until the 1981 general election when he did not stand for re-election. He was again unsuccessful in the November 1982 election.

While a TD, Herbert served as a Member of the European Parliament from 1973 to 1979, being appointed to Ireland's first delegation, second delegation and third delegation.

In the first direct elections to the European Parliament in December 1979 he stood in the Munster constituency but was not elected.

He played hurling as a full-back with the Limerick Senior Hurling team, with whom he won a National Hurling League medal in 1947, and also with his local club Ahane. He retired prematurely from the game following a serious head injury caused by an assault with a hurley in a club match in 1949. His assailant received 12 months imprisonment. His brothers Seán Herbert and Tony Herbert were also hurlers with Limerick and his son Turlough Herbert was a member of the Limerick senior hurling panel for the 1994 All-Ireland final.

Michael Herbert died in 2006, aged 81.

== See also ==
- Families in the Oireachtas

Dáil	Election	Deputy (Party)	Deputy (Party)	Deputy (Party)	Deputy (Party)	Deputy (Party)
13th	1948	Michael Keyes (Lab)	Robert Ryan (FF)	James Reidy (FG)	Daniel Bourke (FF)	4 seats 1948–1981
14th	1951	Michael Keyes (Lab)	Tadhg Crowley (FF)	James Reidy (FG)	Daniel Bourke (FF)	4 seats 1948–1981
14th	1952 by-election	Michael Keyes (Lab)	Tadhg Crowley (FF)	James Reidy (FG)	John Carew (FG)	4 seats 1948–1981
15th	1954	Michael Keyes (Lab)	Tadhg Crowley (FF)	Donogh O'Malley (FF)	John Carew (FG)	4 seats 1948–1981
16th	1957	Ted Russell (Ind.)	Paddy Clohessy (FF)	Donogh O'Malley (FF)	John Carew (FG)	4 seats 1948–1981
17th	1961	Stephen Coughlan (Lab)	Paddy Clohessy (FF)	Donogh O'Malley (FF)	Tom O'Donnell (FG)	4 seats 1948–1981
18th	1965	Stephen Coughlan (Lab)	Paddy Clohessy (FF)	Donogh O'Malley (FF)	Tom O'Donnell (FG)	4 seats 1948–1981
18th	1968 by-election	Stephen Coughlan (Lab)	Paddy Clohessy (FF)	Desmond O'Malley (FF)	Tom O'Donnell (FG)	4 seats 1948–1981
19th	1969	Stephen Coughlan (Lab)	Michael Herbert (FF)	Desmond O'Malley (FF)	Tom O'Donnell (FG)	4 seats 1948–1981
20th	1973	Stephen Coughlan (Lab)	Michael Herbert (FF)	Desmond O'Malley (FF)	Tom O'Donnell (FG)	4 seats 1948–1981
21st	1977	Michael Lipper (Ind.)	Michael Herbert (FF)	Desmond O'Malley (FF)	Tom O'Donnell (FG)	4 seats 1948–1981
22nd	1981	Jim Kemmy (Ind.)	Peadar Clohessy (FF)	Desmond O'Malley (FF)	Tom O'Donnell (FG)	Michael Noonan (FG)
23rd	1982 (Feb)	Jim Kemmy (DSP)	Willie O'Dea (FF)	Desmond O'Malley (FF)	Tom O'Donnell (FG)	Michael Noonan (FG)
24th	1982 (Nov)	Frank Prendergast (Lab)	Willie O'Dea (FF)	Desmond O'Malley (FF)	Tom O'Donnell (FG)	Michael Noonan (FG)
25th	1987	Jim Kemmy (DSP)	Willie O'Dea (FF)	Desmond O'Malley (PDs)	Peadar Clohessy (PDs)	Michael Noonan (FG)
26th	1989	Jim Kemmy (DSP)	Willie O'Dea (FF)	Desmond O'Malley (PDs)	Peadar Clohessy (PDs)	Michael Noonan (FG)
27th	1992	Jim Kemmy (Lab)	Willie O'Dea (FF)	Desmond O'Malley (PDs)	Peadar Clohessy (PDs)	Michael Noonan (FG)
28th	1997	Jim Kemmy (Lab)	Willie O'Dea (FF)	Desmond O'Malley (PDs)	Eddie Wade (FF)	Michael Noonan (FG)
28th	1998 by-election	Jan O'Sullivan (Lab)	Willie O'Dea (FF)	Desmond O'Malley (PDs)	Eddie Wade (FF)	Michael Noonan (FG)
29th	2002	Jan O'Sullivan (Lab)	Willie O'Dea (FF)	Tim O'Malley (PDs)	Peter Power (FF)	Michael Noonan (FG)
30th	2007	Jan O'Sullivan (Lab)	Willie O'Dea (FF)	Kieran O'Donnell (FG)	Peter Power (FF)	Michael Noonan (FG)
31st	2011	Constituency abolished. See Limerick City and Limerick				
