= Michael Collins (Dublin politician) =

Irish politician

Lord Mayor of Dublin
- In office 1977–1978
- Preceded by: Jim Mitchell
- Succeeded by: Paddy Belton

Personal details
- Born: Dublin, Ireland
- Died: Dublin, Ireland
- Party: Labour Party

Michael Collins was an Irish Labour Party politician who served as Lord Mayor of Dublin from 1977 to 1978. He stood unsuccessfully as a Labour Party candidate for Dáil Éireann at the 1973, 1977 and 1981 general elections.

Collins officially opened the Talbot Memorial Bridge in Dublin in 1978.

Civic offices
Preceded by Jim Mitchell	Lord Mayor of Dublin; 1977–1978	Succeeded by Paddy Belton
