= List of members of the European Parliament for Ireland, 1973 =

This is a list of the 10 members of the European Parliament for Ireland appointed to the delegation from the Oireachtas as a result of the Irish accession to the European Economic Community on 1 January 1973. The first delegation, served only two months, from 1 January 1973 until the 1973 general election in February.

Name	National party	National office
Conor Cruise O'Brien	Labour	Teachta Dála
Anthony Esmonde	Fine Gael	Teachta Dála
Michael Herbert	Fianna Fáil	Teachta Dála
Michael Hilliard	Fianna Fáil	Teachta Dála
Justin Keating	Labour	Teachta Dála
Charles McDonald	Fine Gael	Senator
Farrell McElgunn	Fianna Fáil	Senator
Tom Nolan	Fianna Fáil	Teachta Dála
Richie Ryan	Fine Gael	Teachta Dála
Michael Yeats	Fianna Fáil	Senator

== See also ==
- Members of the European Parliament (1958–1979) – List by country
