= Richard Belton =

Irish politician and medical doctor (1913–1974)

Senator
- In office 5 November 1969 – 1 June 1973
- Constituency: Administrative Panel

Personal details
- Born: 8 July 1913 Dublin, Ireland
- Died: 29 May 1974 (aged 60)
- Party: Fine Gael
- Children: Avril Doyle
- Parent: Patrick Belton (father)
- Relatives: Jack Belton (brother); Paddy Belton (brother); Luke Belton (cousin)
- Education: University College Dublin

Richard Belton (8 July 1913 – 29 May 1974) was an Irish Fine Gael politician and medical doctor. He was elected to Seanad Éireann on the Administrative Panel at the 1969 election. He lost his seat at the 1973 Seanad election.

Other members of the Belton family to have served in the Oireachtas include his father Patrick Belton, his brothers Jack Belton and Paddy Belton, his cousin Luke Belton and his daughter Avril Doyle.

He was born in Dublin, the eldest of four brothers. He attended school at Belvedere College and studied medicine at University College Dublin. He was a member of Dún Laoghaire Corporation for 30 years. He served as Chairman of the Dublin Health Authority and was also a member of the Eastern Health Board and of the Governing Body of University College Dublin.

He was an international bridge player and represented Ireland on many occasions.

== See also ==
- Families in the Oireachtas
