= Avril Doyle =

Irish former politician (born 1949)

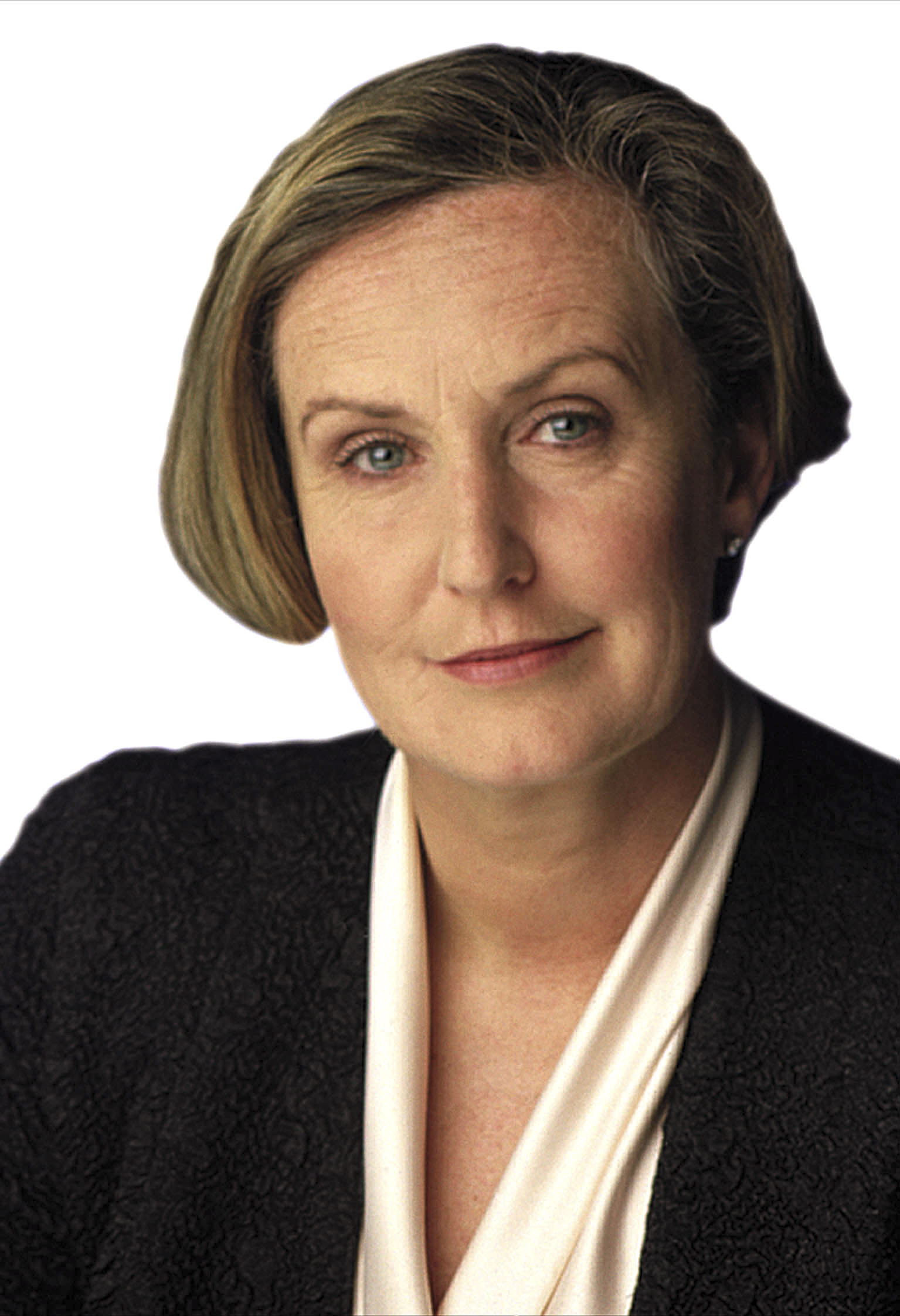
- Doyle in 2012

Minister of State
- 1995–1997: Taoiseach
- 1995–1997: Finance
- 1995–1997: Transport, Energy and Communications
- 1986–1987: Finance
- 1986–1987: Environment

Member of the European Parliament
- In office 1 June 2004 – 1 June 2009
- Constituency: East
- In office 1 June 1999 – 1 June 2004
- Constituency: Leinster

Teachta Dála
- In office November 1992 – June 1997
- In office November 1982 – June 1989
- Constituency: Wexford

Senator
- In office 17 September 1997 – 12 September 2002
- In office 1 November 1989 – 25 November 1992
- Constituency: Agricultural Panel

Personal details
- Born: Avril Belton; 18 April 1949 (age 77) Dublin, Ireland
- Party: Fine Gael
- Parent: Richard Belton (father)
- Relatives: Patrick Belton (grandfather)
- Education: University College Dublin

Avril Doyle (née Belton; born 18 April 1949) is an Irish former Fine Gael politician who served as a Minister of State from 1986 to 1987 and from 1995 to 1997. She served as a Member of the European Parliament (MEP) from 1999 to 2004 and 2004 to 2009, a TD for Wexford from 1982 to 1989 and 1992 to 1997 and a Senator for the Agricultural Panel from 1989 to 1992 and 1997 to 2002.

== Early life ==
Doyle was born in Dublin in 1949; she was educated at Holy Child Killiney secondary school and at University College Dublin (UCD). Her father Richard Belton was a Senator and her grandfather Patrick Belton was a TD. She was born on the day The Republic of Ireland Act 1948 came into effect – which saw the inauguration of Ireland as a republic outside the British Commonwealth.

== Political career ==
In 1974, aged 25, she was elected to Wexford County Council and to Wexford Corporation; she was Mayor of Wexford town from 1975 to 1976. She was first elected to Dáil Éireann at the November 1982 general election as a Fine Gael TD for the Wexford constituency. In February 1986, she was appointed on the nomination of Garret FitzGerald as Minister of State at the Department of Finance with special responsibility for the Office of Public Works, and at the Department of the Environment with special responsibility for Environmental Protection.

She lost her seat at the 1989 general election, serving as a member of Seanad Éireann from 1989 to 1992. She was re-elected to the Dáil at the 1992 general election. In January 1995, she was appointed on the nomination of John Bruton as Minister of State at the Department of the Taoiseach, at the Department of Finance and at the Department of Transport, Energy and Communications with responsibility for consumers of public services. At the 1997 general election, she lost to party colleague Michael D'Arcy, and was again elected to the Seanad, serving from 1997 to 2002.

She was elected as an MEP at the 1999 election and re-elected at the 2004 election.

Doyle made news during a debate in the European Parliament in June 2008 after the rejection of the Treaty of Lisbon by Irish voters. A group of British Eurosceptic MEPs wore green hats and T-shirts, encouraging the EU to respect the Irish 'no' vote. However, many Irish MEPs saw this as self-serving and felt that there would be no Eurosceptic support for Irish opinion had the treaty been accepted; and Doyle was both lauded and criticised for the following comment, which is a reference to the forceful occupation of Ireland by Britain; "How the history books could have been written differently, if respect for the Irish vote from some of our British colleagues was always there."

On 7 January 2009, she announced that she would not seek re-election to the European Parliament at the 2009 election.

On 21 June 2011, she announced her intention to seek the Fine Gael party nomination for the 2011 presidential election. She withdrew from the nomination process in October 2011.

== See also ==
- Families in the Oireachtas

Political offices
Preceded by Joseph Bermingham	Minister of State at the Department of Finance; 1986–1987	Succeeded by Noel Treacy
Preceded by Fergus O'Brien	Minister of State at the Department of the Environment; 1986–1987; With: Fergus O'Brien; Toddy O'Sullivan	Succeeded by Ger Connolly
Preceded by Noel Dempsey; Eithne FitzGerald; Noel Treacy	Minister of State at the Department of Finance; 1995–1997; With: Phil Hogan (1994–1995); Jim Higgins (1995); Hugh Coveney (1995–1997)	Succeeded by Martin Cullen
Preceded by Noel Dempsey; Tom Kitt; Noel Treacy	Minister of State at the Department of the Taoiseach; 1995–1997; With: Phil Hogan (1994–1995); Jim Higgins (1995); Donal Carey; Gay Mitchell	Succeeded by Séamus Brennan; Dick Roche
Preceded by Noel Dempsey	Minister of State at the Department of Transport, Energy and Communications; 1995–1997; With: Emmet Stagg	Succeeded by Joe Jacob as Minister of State at the Department of Public Enterprise

Dáil	Election	Deputy (Party)	Deputy (Party)	Deputy (Party)	Deputy (Party)	Deputy (Party)
2nd	1921	Richard Corish (SF)	James Ryan (SF)	Séamus Doyle (SF)	Seán Etchingham (SF)	4 seats 1921–1923
3rd	1922	Richard Corish (Lab)	Daniel O'Callaghan (Lab)	Séamus Doyle (AT-SF)	Michael Doyle (FP)	4 seats 1921–1923
4th	1923	Richard Corish (Lab)	James Ryan (Rep)	Robert Lambert (Rep)	Michael Doyle (FP)	Osmond Esmonde (CnaG)
5th	1927 (Jun)	Richard Corish (Lab)	James Ryan (FF)	James Shannon (Lab)	Michael Doyle (FP)	John Keating (NL)
6th	1927 (Sep)	Richard Corish (Lab)	James Ryan (FF)	Denis Allen (FF)	Michael Jordan (FP)	Osmond Esmonde (CnaG)
7th	1932	Richard Corish (Lab)	James Ryan (FF)	Denis Allen (FF)	John Keating (CnaG)	Osmond Esmonde (CnaG)
8th	1933	Richard Corish (Lab)	James Ryan (FF)	Patrick Kehoe (FF)	John Keating (CnaG)	Osmond Esmonde (CnaG)
8th	1936 by-election	Richard Corish (Lab)	James Ryan (FF)	Patrick Kehoe (FF)	John Keating (CnaG)	Denis Allen (FF)
9th	1937	Richard Corish (Lab)	James Ryan (FF)	John Keating (FG)	John Esmonde (FG)	Denis Allen (FF)
10th	1938	Richard Corish (Lab)	James Ryan (FF)	John Keating (FG)	John Esmonde (FG)	Denis Allen (FF)
11th	1943	Richard Corish (Lab)	James Ryan (FF)	John O'Leary (Lab)	John Esmonde (FG)	Denis Allen (FF)
12th	1944	Richard Corish (Lab)	James Ryan (FF)	John O'Leary (NLP)	John Keating (FG)	Denis Allen (FF)
12th	1945 by-election	Brendan Corish (Lab)	James Ryan (FF)	John O'Leary (NLP)	John Keating (FG)	Denis Allen (FF)
13th	1948	Brendan Corish (Lab)	James Ryan (FF)	John O'Leary (NLP)	John Esmonde (FG)	Denis Allen (FF)
14th	1951	Brendan Corish (Lab)	James Ryan (FF)	John O'Leary (Lab)	Anthony Esmonde (FG)	Denis Allen (FF)
15th	1954	Brendan Corish (Lab)	James Ryan (FF)	John O'Leary (Lab)	Anthony Esmonde (FG)	Denis Allen (FF)
16th	1957	Brendan Corish (Lab)	James Ryan (FF)	Seán Browne (FF)	Anthony Esmonde (FG)	Denis Allen (FF)
17th	1961	Brendan Corish (Lab)	James Ryan (FF)	Lorcan Allen (FF)	Anthony Esmonde (FG)	4 seats 1961–1981
18th	1965	Brendan Corish (Lab)	James Kennedy (FF)	Lorcan Allen (FF)	Anthony Esmonde (FG)	4 seats 1961–1981
19th	1969	Brendan Corish (Lab)	Seán Browne (FF)	Lorcan Allen (FF)	Anthony Esmonde (FG)	4 seats 1961–1981
20th	1973	Brendan Corish (Lab)	Seán Browne (FF)	Lorcan Allen (FF)	John Esmonde (FG)	4 seats 1961–1981
21st	1977	Brendan Corish (Lab)	Seán Browne (FF)	Lorcan Allen (FF)	Michael D'Arcy (FG)	4 seats 1961–1981
22nd	1981	Brendan Corish (Lab)	Ivan Yates (FG)	Lorcan Allen (FF)	Michael D'Arcy (FG)	Hugh Byrne (FF)
23rd	1982 (Feb)	Seán Browne (FF)	Ivan Yates (FG)	Lorcan Allen (FF)	Michael D'Arcy (FG)	Hugh Byrne (FF)
24th	1982 (Nov)	Avril Doyle (FG)	Ivan Yates (FG)	John Browne (FF)	Michael D'Arcy (FG)	Hugh Byrne (FF)
25th	1987	Avril Doyle (FG)	Ivan Yates (FG)	John Browne (FF)	Brendan Howlin (Lab)	Hugh Byrne (FF)
26th	1989	Michael D'Arcy (FG)	Ivan Yates (FG)	John Browne (FF)	Brendan Howlin (Lab)	Séamus Cullimore (FF)
27th	1992	Avril Doyle (FG)	Ivan Yates (FG)	John Browne (FF)	Brendan Howlin (Lab)	Hugh Byrne (FF)
28th	1997	Michael D'Arcy (FG)	Ivan Yates (FG)	John Browne (FF)	Brendan Howlin (Lab)	Hugh Byrne (FF)
29th	2002	Paul Kehoe (FG)	Liam Twomey (Ind.)	John Browne (FF)	Brendan Howlin (Lab)	Tony Dempsey (FF)
30th	2007	Paul Kehoe (FG)	Michael W. D'Arcy (FG)	John Browne (FF)	Brendan Howlin (Lab)	Seán Connick (FF)
31st	2011	Paul Kehoe (FG)	Liam Twomey (FG)	John Browne (FF)	Brendan Howlin (Lab)	Mick Wallace (Ind.)
32nd	2016	Paul Kehoe (FG)	Michael W. D'Arcy (FG)	James Browne (FF)	Brendan Howlin (Lab)	Mick Wallace (I4C)
32nd	2019 by-election	Paul Kehoe (FG)	Michael W. D'Arcy (FG)	James Browne (FF)	Brendan Howlin (Lab)	Malcolm Byrne (FF)
33rd	2020	Paul Kehoe (FG)	Verona Murphy (Ind.)	James Browne (FF)	Brendan Howlin (Lab)	Johnny Mythen (SF)
34th	2024	4 seats since 2024	Verona Murphy (Ind.)	James Browne (FF)	George Lawlor (Lab)	Johnny Mythen (SF)
