= Patrick Belton =

Irish politician (1884–1945)

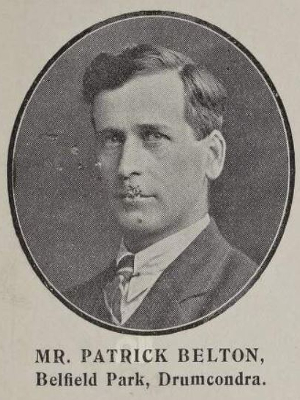
- Belton in 1933

Teachta Dála
- In office June 1938 – June 1943
- In office January 1933 – June 1937
- Constituency: Dublin North
- In office June 1927 – September 1927
- Constituency: Dublin County

Personal details
- Born: 7 November 1884 Rathcline, Lanesborough, County Longford, Ireland
- Died: 30 January 1945 (aged 61) Killiney, County Dublin, Ireland
- Party: National Democratic Party; Fianna Fáil; Cumann na nGaedheal; Fine Gael; Independent
- Spouse: Mary Fitzgibbon (m. 1912)
- Children: 4, including Richard, Jack and Paddy.
- Relatives: Avril Doyle (granddaughter)

Military service
- Branch/service: Irish Republican Brotherhood
- Battles/wars: Easter Rising

Patrick Belton (7 November 1884 – 30 January 1945) was an Irish nationalist, politician, farmer, and businessman. Closely associated with Michael Collins, he was active in the 1916 Easter Rising and in the Republican movement in the years that followed. Belton later provided a strong Catholic voice in an Irish nationalist context throughout his career. He was strongly anti-communist and he was a founder and leader of the Irish Christian Front. Supportive of Francisco Franco, Belton however opposed Eoin O'Duffy taking an Irish Brigade to Spain, feeling that they would be needed in Ireland to counter domestic "political ills".

== Nationalist beginnings ==
Belton was born in 1884 in Rathcline, near Lanesborough, County Longford, the youngest of seven children of Richard Belton, a farmer, and Mary Belton (née Rhatigan).

He attended the local national school and subsequently won a scholarship to King's College London. Following his education, he stayed in London and entered the Civil Service. He became very friendly with Arthur Griffith and Michael Collins at this time. In 1905, he was present at the establishment of Sinn Féin in London, and in November 1909, according to some sources, he initiated Michael Collins into Irish Republican Brotherhood (IRB). He was a prominent member of the Geraldines GAA Club in London, and he was for many years its president. In 1909 he became Secretary of the London County Board of the GAA.

In 1910 he was transferred to the Irish Land Commission in Dublin.

== 1916 and after ==
Belton took part in the 1916 Easter Rising. His obituary in the Longford Leader noted that he "… was associated with Michael Collins and other London comrades when they came to Ireland in 1916 for the Rising. After the Rising he was suspended from the Land Commission on suspicion of having been connected with the event, but was later reinstated". A detailed narrative of his activities during the 1916 Rising is contained in a handwritten letter he sent in 1937 to Máire English, supporting her claim to a Military Service Pension. It suggests that he was either physically in the GPO at some stage during the Rising, or in some way attached to the insurgents based there.

After reports in 1918 that 'large bodies of Sinn Féiners' had assembled and were drilling on his lands, the police raided his house on 30 July. While some of those present managed to escape, two revolvers and more than fifty rounds of ammunition were discovered in the house. Various papers were found which showed Belton's involvement with the Irish National Aid Association, the Irish Volunteer Dependants' Fund, Sinn Féin, and the Patriots' Graves Committee. There was a pass admitting the bearer to the graveside of Thomas Ashe on the day of his funeral. On 31 August 1918, Belton was sentenced to six months imprisonment with hard labour for possessing arms and ammunition. He served his sentence in Mountjoy and Belfast jails.

In the 1923 general election, he stood unsuccessfully for the National Democratic Party in Leix–Offaly.

== Events of 1927 ==
Belton was elected as a Fianna Fáil Teachta Dála (TD) for Dublin County in the June 1927 general election. In the eight-seat constituency, he was the third person to be elected, after Kevin O'Higgins (of Cumann na nGaedheal), who would be assassinated one month later, and Bryan Cooper. Fianna Fáil, which had been founded in 1926 by Éamon de Valera, contested Free State elections but its policy was to refuse to take seats in the Dáil; this was because the Oath of Allegiance, agreed in the Treaty, required all TDs to swear, inter alia: "I will be faithful to H.M. King George V, his heirs and successors …"

The 5th Dáil first met on 23 June 1927. On 26 July, Belton broke with Fianna Fáil policy, taking the Oath of Allegiance and entering the Dáil. The next day's paper quoted him as saying that he was taking his seat in the hope of saving the nation "from the degradation and destruction" which he believed the passage of proposed new legislation would involve. These measures included, in addition to the Electoral Amendment Bill (requiring inter alia that all Dáil candidates take the Oath of Allegiance), a Public Safety Bill incorporating tough new measures, and which was partly a reaction to the assassination on 10 July of Kevin O'Higgins by IRA members. The National Executive of Fianna Fáil expelled him from the party and called on him to resign his seat. Éamon de Valera said: "As for Mr Belton, everybody who was not absolutely blind could see that Mr Belton, since his election, has been manoeuvring for an opportunity to go in and take the oath. He will be alone, however."

At the time of his dismissal from Fianna Fáil, Belton had been a TD for only six weeks. On 11 August, de Valera and the 42 other Fianna Fáil TDs altered their policy and decided to take the Oath, characterising it as "merely an empty political formula".

Belton lost his seat in the general election of September 1927, in which he stood as an Independent. From this time onward, there was a mutual and obvious enmity between Belton and de Valera.

== Briefly joining Cumann na nGaedheal/Fine Gael ==
Belton joined Cumann na nGaedheal in 1933 and was returned as a TD for Dublin North at the 1933 general election. In 1933, the party merged with the National Centre Party and the Blueshirts to form Fine Gael, with Eoin O'Duffy, leader of the Blueshirts, becoming the first leader of Fine Gael. The following year, O'Duffy was pushed out as party leader. Belton sided with O'Duffy, leading to his own expulsion.

In October 1935, following the outbreak of the Second Italo-Ethiopian War, Belton suggested the cause of the wars was down to "Jews", who were "there or thereabouts in Abyssinia, too".

== Irish Christian Front ==
On 22 August 1936, the Irish Independent called for the formation of a committee to help the (pro-Franco) citizens of Spain in their war effort. These calls for support resulted in the formation of the Irish Christian Front (ICF). The ICF held its initial meeting at the Mansion House in Dublin on 31 August 1936. Belton became the organisation's president. The group had overwhelming support from the general population as well as the backing of the Catholic Church.

The ICF claimed that it was non-sectarian, in order to build up its support base. It also claimed to be non-political, interested only in helping the church in Spain and not partisan politics. Despite these claims, the organisations' ideological leanings soon became apparent:

When our organisation's work is complete we will make Ireland a very hot spot for any communist to live in … if it is necessary to be a fascist to defend Christianity then I am a fascist and so are my colleagues.

— Patrick Belton, Irish Independent, 12 October 1936

The ICF would hold pro-Catholic and anti-communist rallies, drawing an estimated crowd of 40,000 on one occasion, and would seek to publicise the massacres committed by the Spanish Republicans. In November 1936, Belton travelled to Spain to arrange for a shipment of medical supplies to be purchased with funds raised from church-gate collections. However, Belton, a supporter of nationalist Spain, claimed that the important battle was to be fought at home and not abroad. Belton opposed Eoin O'Duffy's dispatching of the Irish Brigade in the Spanish Civil War, opposing the move on the grounds that he believed the battle against communism would be fought at home, not abroad. During this time, Belton began openly engaging in antisemitism:

We hear the boasting coming from the Government Benches, we heard it today, of the progress of industrialisation. It is time that we in this country came down to tin-tacks and got some little moral courage. It is time for us to pull the wool off our eyes and tell this House and tell the country what industrialisation in this country really means. It means that we are handing this country over to a gang of international Jews.

— Patrick Belton, Dáil Éireann debate – Thursday, 4 March 1937

Communism can only be kept out of this country by clearing the breeding grounds of Communism, and those breeding grounds are poverty, bad conditions and propagandists. I suggest that Jews have been the propagandists of Communism the world over, and we should not let them into sheltered trades and positions in this country to carry on their propaganda.

— Patrick Belton, Dáil Éireann debate – Wednesday, 10 March 1937

The ICF's popularIty would dwindle following Belton's loss in the 1937 general election, as well as its inability to change the government's policy on Spain and in the face of heavy casualties suffered by O'Duffy's volunteers.

== Later life ==
Belton had been involved in farming and/or market gardening from an early stage, even dating back to his time in the Land Commission. In 1917 he had acquired a sizeable holding at Belfield Park in Drumcondra, and in 1938 he moved to a farm at Bellevue Park, Killiney on Dublin's southside. In 1937, he was active building several hundred houses at Belton Park, part of Puckstown Lane, which he renamed Collins Avenue. He also became active in the licensed trade, opening a public house on Collins Avenue. Around that time, however, his health seems to have taken a turn for the worse.

Reporting to the October 1937 Special Convention of the ICF, the organisation's honorary secretary stated that in April Belton "suffered from a severe breakdown in health caused by overwork, principally his efforts on behalf of the Irish Christian Front, and more especially by hardships undergone by him through his journey to Spain. His illness necessitated a considerable slowing down of activities". Despite this deterioration in health, he was elected as a Fine Gael TD for Dublin County at the 1938 general election. In 1939, he attempted to buy Glencairn House from Boss Croker's estate, but the sale fell through. He lost his Dáil seat at the 1943 general election.

He died on 30 January 1945, at his home in Killiney, County Dublin.

On 2 October 1912, he married Mary (Molly) Fitzgibbon, a civil servant from Limerick who had been working in London; they had four sons. Three of them – Richard, Jack and Paddy – served as members of the Oireachtas, and also his granddaughter, Avril Doyle.

== Quotes ==
"I did not agree with the wisdom of Irishmen going out to Spain." – Irish Press (26 November 1936)

"I have never been a party politician in the sense that I would obey the orders of any political junta who would tell me to do a thing, whether I considered it right or wrong." – Irish Press (30 January 1937)

== See also ==
- Families in the Oireachtas

Dáil	Election	Deputy (Party)	Deputy (Party)	Deputy (Party)	Deputy (Party)	Deputy (Party)	Deputy (Party)	Deputy (Party)	Deputy (Party)
2nd	1921	Michael Derham (SF)	George Gavan Duffy (SF)	Séamus Dwyer (SF)	Desmond FitzGerald (SF)	Frank Lawless (SF)	Margaret Pearse (SF)	6 seats 1921–1923	
3rd	1922	Michael Derham (PT-SF)	George Gavan Duffy (PT-SF)	Thomas Johnson (Lab)	Desmond FitzGerald (PT-SF)	Darrell Figgis (Ind)	John Rooney (FP)	6 seats 1921–1923	
4th	1923	Michael Derham (CnaG)	Bryan Cooper (Ind)	Thomas Johnson (Lab)	Desmond FitzGerald (CnaG)	Darrell Figgis (Ind)	John Good (Ind)	Kathleen Lynn (Rep)	Kevin O'Higgins (CnaG)
4th	1924 by-election	Batt O'Connor (CnaG)	Bryan Cooper (Ind)	Thomas Johnson (Lab)	Desmond FitzGerald (CnaG)	Darrell Figgis (Ind)	John Good (Ind)	Kathleen Lynn (Rep)	Kevin O'Higgins (CnaG)
4th	1926 by-election	Batt O'Connor (CnaG)	Bryan Cooper (Ind)	Thomas Johnson (Lab)	Desmond FitzGerald (CnaG)	William Norton (Lab)	John Good (Ind)	Kathleen Lynn (Rep)	Kevin O'Higgins (CnaG)
5th	1927 (Jun)	Batt O'Connor (CnaG)	Bryan Cooper (Ind)	Thomas Johnson (Lab)	Desmond FitzGerald (CnaG)	Patrick Belton (FF)	John Good (Ind)	Seán MacEntee (FF)	Kevin O'Higgins (CnaG)
5th	1927 by-election	Batt O'Connor (CnaG)	Bryan Cooper (Ind)	Thomas Johnson (Lab)	Desmond FitzGerald (CnaG)	Patrick Belton (FF)	John Good (Ind)	Seán MacEntee (FF)	Gearóid O'Sullivan (CnaG)
6th	1927 (Sep)	Batt O'Connor (CnaG)	Bryan Cooper (CnaG)	Joseph Murphy (Ind)	Desmond FitzGerald (CnaG)	Seán Brady (FF)	John Good (Ind)	Seán MacEntee (FF)	Gearóid O'Sullivan (CnaG)
6th	1930 by-election	Batt O'Connor (CnaG)	Thomas Finlay (CnaG)	Joseph Murphy (Ind)	Desmond FitzGerald (CnaG)	Seán Brady (FF)	John Good (Ind)	Seán MacEntee (FF)	Gearóid O'Sullivan (CnaG)
7th	1932	Batt O'Connor (CnaG)	Thomas Finlay (CnaG)	Patrick Curran (Lab)	Henry Dockrell (CnaG)	Seán Brady (FF)	John Good (Ind)	Seán MacEntee (FF)	Gearóid O'Sullivan (CnaG)
8th	1933	Batt O'Connor (CnaG)	John A. Costello (CnaG)	Margaret Mary Pearse (FF)	Henry Dockrell (CnaG)	Seán Brady (FF)	John Good (Ind)	Seán MacEntee (FF)	Gearóid O'Sullivan (CnaG)
8th	1935 by-election	Cecil Lavery (FG)	John A. Costello (CnaG)	Margaret Mary Pearse (FF)	Henry Dockrell (CnaG)	Seán Brady (FF)	John Good (Ind)	Seán MacEntee (FF)	Gearóid O'Sullivan (CnaG)
9th	1937	Cecil Lavery (FG)	Henry Dockrell (FG)	Gerrard McGowan (Lab)	Patrick Fogarty (FF)	Seán Brady (FF)	5 seats 1937–1948		
10th	1938	Patrick Belton (FG)	Henry Dockrell (FG)	Thomas Mullen (FF)	Patrick Fogarty (FF)	Seán Brady (FF)	5 seats 1937–1948		
11th	1943	Liam Cosgrave (FG)	Henry Dockrell (FG)	James Tunney (Lab)	Patrick Fogarty (FF)	Seán Brady (FF)	5 seats 1937–1948		
12th	1944	Liam Cosgrave (FG)	Henry Dockrell (FG)	Patrick Burke (FF)	Patrick Fogarty (FF)	Seán Brady (FF)	5 seats 1937–1948		
12th	1947 by-election	Liam Cosgrave (FG)	Henry Dockrell (FG)	Patrick Burke (FF)	Seán MacBride (CnaP)	Seán Brady (FF)	5 seats 1937–1948		
13th	1948	Éamon Rooney (FG)	Seán Dunne (Lab)	Patrick Burke (FF)	3 seats 1948–1961				
14th	1951	Éamon Rooney (FG)	Seán Dunne (Lab)	Patrick Burke (FF)	3 seats 1948–1961				
15th	1954	Éamon Rooney (FG)	Seán Dunne (Lab)	Patrick Burke (FF)	3 seats 1948–1961				
16th	1957	Éamon Rooney (FG)	Kevin Boland (FF)	Patrick Burke (FF)	3 seats 1948–1961				
17th	1961	Éamon Rooney (FG)	Kevin Boland (FF)	Patrick Burke (FF)	Mark Clinton (FG)	Seán Dunne (Ind)	5 seats 1961–1969		
18th	1965	Des Foley (FF)	Kevin Boland (FF)	Patrick Burke (FF)	Mark Clinton (FG)	Seán Dunne (Lab)	5 seats 1961–1969		
19th	1969	Constituency abolished. See Dublin County North and Dublin County South							

Dáil	Election	Deputy (Party)	Deputy (Party)	Deputy (Party)	Deputy (Party)	Deputy (Party)	Deputy (Party)	Deputy (Party)	Deputy (Party)
4th	1923	Alfie Byrne (Ind.)	Francis Cahill (CnaG)	Margaret Collins-O'Driscoll (CnaG)	Seán McGarry (CnaG)	William Hewat (BP)	Richard Mulcahy (CnaG)	Seán T. O'Kelly (Rep)	Ernie O'Malley (Rep)
4th	1925 by-election	Alfie Byrne (Ind.)	Patrick Leonard (CnaG)	Margaret Collins-O'Driscoll (CnaG)	Oscar Traynor (Rep)	William Hewat (BP)	Richard Mulcahy (CnaG)	Seán T. O'Kelly (Rep)	Ernie O'Malley (Rep)
5th	1927 (Jun)	Alfie Byrne (Ind.)	John Byrne (CnaG)	Margaret Collins-O'Driscoll (CnaG)	Oscar Traynor (SF)	Denis Cullen (Lab)	Richard Mulcahy (CnaG)	Seán T. O'Kelly (FF)	Kathleen Clarke (FF)
6th	1927 (Sep)	Alfie Byrne (Ind.)	John Byrne (CnaG)	Margaret Collins-O'Driscoll (CnaG)	Patrick Leonard (CnaG)	James Larkin (IWL)	Richard Mulcahy (CnaG)	Seán T. O'Kelly (FF)	Eamonn Cooney (FF)
6th	1928 by-election	Alfie Byrne (Ind.)	John Byrne (CnaG)	Margaret Collins-O'Driscoll (CnaG)	Patrick Leonard (CnaG)	Vincent Rice (CnaG)	Richard Mulcahy (CnaG)	Seán T. O'Kelly (FF)	Eamonn Cooney (FF)
6th	1929 by-election	Thomas F. O'Higgins (CnaG)	John Byrne (CnaG)	Margaret Collins-O'Driscoll (CnaG)	Patrick Leonard (CnaG)	Vincent Rice (CnaG)	Richard Mulcahy (CnaG)	Seán T. O'Kelly (FF)	Eamonn Cooney (FF)
7th	1932	Alfie Byrne (Ind.)	John Byrne (CnaG)	Margaret Collins-O'Driscoll (CnaG)	Oscar Traynor (FF)	Cormac Breathnach (FF)	Richard Mulcahy (CnaG)	Seán T. O'Kelly (FF)	Eamonn Cooney (FF)
8th	1933	Alfie Byrne (Ind.)	Patrick Belton (CnaG)	Vincent Rice (CnaG)	Oscar Traynor (FF)	Cormac Breathnach (FF)	Richard Mulcahy (CnaG)	Seán T. O'Kelly (FF)	Eamonn Cooney (FF)
9th	1937	Constituency abolished. See Dublin North-East and Dublin North-West							

Dáil	Election	Deputy (Party)	Deputy (Party)	Deputy (Party)	Deputy (Party)
22nd	1981	Ray Burke (FF)	John Boland (FG)	Nora Owen (FG)	3 seats 1981–1992
23rd	1982 (Feb)	Ray Burke (FF)	John Boland (FG)	Nora Owen (FG)	3 seats 1981–1992
24th	1982 (Nov)	Ray Burke (FF)	John Boland (FG)	Nora Owen (FG)	3 seats 1981–1992
25th	1987	Ray Burke (FF)	John Boland (FG)	G. V. Wright (FF)	3 seats 1981–1992
26th	1989	Ray Burke (FF)	Nora Owen (FG)	Seán Ryan (Lab)	3 seats 1981–1992
27th	1992	Ray Burke (FF)	Nora Owen (FG)	Seán Ryan (Lab)	Trevor Sargent (GP)
28th	1997	Ray Burke (FF)	Nora Owen (FG)	G. V. Wright (FF)	Trevor Sargent (GP)
28th	1998 by-election	Seán Ryan (Lab)	Nora Owen (FG)	G. V. Wright (FF)	Trevor Sargent (GP)
29th	2002	Seán Ryan (Lab)	Jim Glennon (FF)	G. V. Wright (FF)	Trevor Sargent (GP)
30th	2007	James Reilly (FG)	Michael Kennedy (FF)	Darragh O'Brien (FF)	Trevor Sargent (GP)
31st	2011	James Reilly (FG)	Alan Farrell (FG)	Brendan Ryan (Lab)	Clare Daly (SP)
32nd	2016	Constituency abolished. See Dublin Fingal			
