= Charles Belton =

English cricketer

Personal information
- Full name: Charles Harris Belton
- Born: 30 April 1820; Aylesford, Kent
- Died: 1 January 1891 (aged 70); Chatham, Kent
- Batting: Right-handed
- Role: Batsman

Domestic team information
- Years: Team
- 1847: Kent

Career statistics
Competition	First-class
Matches	2
Runs scored	89
Batting average	10.25
100s/50s	0/0
Top score	23
Catches/stumpings	7/–
- Source: ESPNcricinfo, 27 June 2014

Charles Harris Belton (christened 30 April 1820 – 1 January 1891) was an English cricketer. Born at Aylesford, Kent, Belton was a batsman who played regularly for Town Malling during the 1840s and 1850s.

Belton made two first-class cricket appearance for Kent County Cricket Club in 1847. Both came against Surrey, firstly at The Oval and then at Preston Hall, Aylesford. Belton scored 41 runs in his two matches, with a top-score of 23. He took seven catches.

Belton was the son of a farm bailiff and worked in a variety of jobs, including as an agricultural labourer, a beer retailer and in Chatham Dockyard. He married Sarah Usher and had six children. He died of a cerebral haemorrhage at Chatham, Kent on 1 January 1891.

== Bibliography ==
- Carlaw, Derek (2020). Kent County Cricketers, A to Z: Part One (1806–1914) (PDF). Cardiff: ACS.
