= List of members of the European Parliament for the Netherlands, 1958–1979 =

This is a list of members of the European Parliament for the Netherlands in the 1958 to 1979 session.

== Alphabetical ==
MEPs for the Netherlands delegated to the European Parliament
Name	Sex	National Party	Period
Wim Albers	Male	Labour Party	3 October 1974 – 17 July 1979
Marius van Amelsvoort	Male	Catholic People's Party	9 March 1970 – 13 September 1971
Jan Baas	Male	People's Party for Freedom and Democracy	16 September 1963 – 17 July 1979
Nel Barendregt	Female	Labour Party	13 March 1973 – 4 June 1973
Cees Berkhouwer	Male	People's Party for Freedom and Democracy	16 September 1963 – 12 July 1979
Barend Biesheuvel	Male	Anti-Revolutionary Party	7 March 1961 – 24 July 1963
Pieter Blaisse	Male	Catholic People's Party	1 January 1958 – 8 May 1967
Jaap Boersma	Male	Anti-Revolutionary Party	8 May 1967 – 6 July 1971
Kees Boertien	Male	Anti-Revolutionary Party	8 May 1967 – 6 July 1971
Corstiaan Bos	Male	Christian Historical Union	12 March 1969 – 6 June 1973
Jan Broeksz	Male	Labour Party	16 November 1970 – 15 July 1979
Tiemen Brouwer	Male	Catholic People's Party	8 May 1967 – 11 May 1973
Jaap Burger	Male	Labour Party	20 October 1966 – 29 September 1970
Flip van Campen	Male	Catholic People's Party	25 February 1958 – 10 May 1971
Frederik Gerard van Dijk	Male	People's Party for Freedom and Democracy	22 June 1959 – 4 September 1963
Doeke Eisma	Male	Democrats 66	13 May 1973 – 2 October 1974
Maarten Engwirda	Male	Democrats 66	22 September 1971 – 12 March 1973
Wilhelm Friedrich de Gaay Fortman	Male	Anti-Revolutionary Party	13 March 1978 – 15 July 1979
Marinus van der Goes van Naters	Male	Labour Party	1 January 1958 – 7 May 1967
Wessel Hartog	Male	Communist Party of the Netherlands	17 October 1974 – 1 September 1976
Cees Hazenbosch	Male	Anti-Revolutionary Party	1 January 1958 – 10 January 1961
Arie van der Hek	Male	Labour Party	3 July 1973 – 17 October 1977
Johan van Hulst	Male	Christian Historical Union	16 October 1961 – 30 September 1968
M.M.A.A. Janssen	Male	Catholic People's Party	1 January 1958 – 25 September 1963
Jan de Koning	Male	Anti-Revolutionary Party	22 September 1971 – 19 December 1977
Henk Korthals	Male	People's Party for Freedom and Democracy	1 January 1958 – 19 May 1959
Reint Laan	Male	Labour Party	16 June 1965 – 1 March 1968
Cees Laban	Male	Labour Party	3 July 1973 – 5 September 1977
Jan Lamberts	Male	Labour Party	24 October 1977 – 17 July 1979
Pierre Lardinois	Male	Catholic People's Party	14 October 1963 – 5 April 1967
Franz Lichtenauer	Male	Christian Historical Union	1 January 1958 – 1 October 1961
Durk van der Mei	Male	Christian Historical Union	9 March 1976 – 30 December 1977
Joep Mommersteeg	Male	Catholic People's Party	22 September 1971 – 11 May 1973
Gerard Nederhorst	Male	Labour Party	1 January 1958 – 29 September 1965
Harrij Notenboom	Male	Catholic People's Party	22 September 1971 – 17 July 1979
Ad Oele	Male	Labour Party	21 October 1965 – 16 January 1973
Schelto Patijn	Male	Labour Party	3 July 1973 – 16 July 1979
Kees van der Ploeg	Male	Catholic People's Party	19 March 1958 – 14 September 1971
Siep Posthumus	Male	Labour Party	19 March 1958 – 24 May 1965 and 11 May 1968 – 15 September 1971
Jan Pronk	Male	Labour Party	13 March 1973 – 11 May 1973
Kees Raedts	Male	Catholic People's Party	11 May 1967 – 11 February 1970
Willem Rip	Male	Anti-Revolutionary Party	1 January 1958 – 8 February 1959
Jacqueline Rutgers	Female	Anti-Revolutionary Party	14 October 1963 – 8 May 1967
Piet van der Sanden	Male	Catholic People's Party	3 July 1973 – 3 October 1974
Maan Sassen	Male	Catholic People's Party	1 January 1958 – 13 February 1958
Willem Scholten	Male	Christian Historical Union	25 June 1973 – 1 March 1976
Jo Schouwenaar-Franssen	Female	People's Party for Freedom and Democracy	16 January 1961 – 24 July 1963
Wim Schuijt	Male	Catholic People's Party	19 March 1958 – 18 January 1977
Max van der Stoel	Male	Labour Party	22 September 1971 – 11 May 1973
Teun Tolman	Male	Christian Historical Union	19 January 1978 – 17 July 1979
Wim Vergeer	Male	Catholic People's Party	19 January 1978 – 17 July 1979
Henk Vredeling	Male	Labour Party	19 March 1958 – 11 May 1973
Henk Waltmans	Male	Political Party of Radicals	16 September 1976 – 17 October 1977
Tjerk Westerterp	Male	Catholic People's Party	8 May 1967 – 17 August 1971
Ep Wieldraaijer	Male	Labour Party	3 July 1973 – 19 September 1974
Bob de Wilde	Male	People's Party for Freedom and Democracy	14 May 1959 – 20 December 1960
