= List of members of the European Parliament for Ireland, 1977–1979 =

This is a list of the 10 members of the European Parliament for Ireland appointed to the delegation from the Oireachtas after the 1977 general election who served from December 1977 until the first direct elections in 1979.

Name	National party	National office
Seán Brosnan	Fianna Fáil	Teachta Dála
Ruairí Brugha	Fianna Fáil	Teachta Dála
Michael Herbert	Fianna Fáil	Teachta Dála
Liam Kavanagh	Labour	Teachta Dála
Gerry L'Estrange	Fine Gael	Teachta Dála
Charles McDonald	Fine Gael	Senator
Tom Nolan	Fianna Fáil	Teachta Dála
Paddy Power	Fianna Fáil	Teachta Dála
Richie Ryan	Fine Gael	Teachta Dála
Michael Yeats	Fianna Fáil	Senator

== See also ==
- Members of the European Parliament (1958–1979) – List by country
