= Donal Creed =

Irish politician (1924–2017)

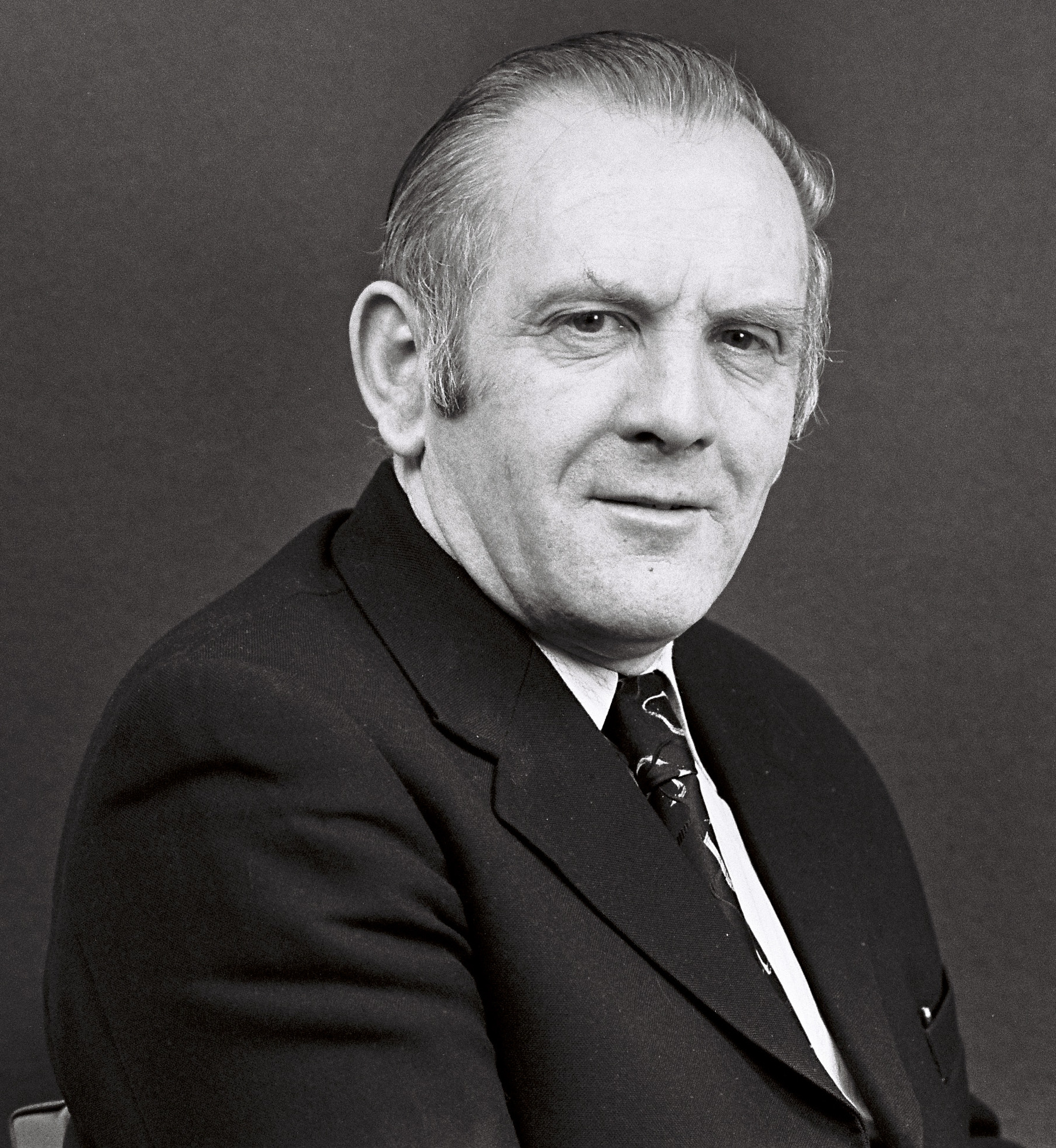

Minister of State
- 1982–1986: Education
- 1981–1982: Environment
- 1981: Health

Teachta Dála
- In office June 1981 – June 1989
- Constituency: Cork North-West
- In office April 1965 – June 1981
- Constituency: Cork Mid

Member of the European Parliament
- In office May 1973 – June 1977
- Constituency: Oireachtas Delegation

Personal details
- Born: 7 September 1924 Cork, Ireland
- Died: 23 November 2017 (aged 93) Macroom, County Cork, Ireland
- Party: Fine Gael
- Spouse: Madeleine Kelleher (m. 1955)
- Children: 8, including Michael

Donal John Creed (7 September 1924 – 23 November 2017) was an Irish Fine Gael politician who served as a Minister of State from June 1981 to February 1982 and from December 1982 to February 1986. He served as a Teachta Dála (TD) from 1965 to 1989. He was a Member of the European Parliament (MEP) for the Oireachtas from 1973 to 1977.

== Political career ==
He first stood for Dáil Éireann at a by-election in March 1965 for the Cork Mid constituency, following the death of the Labour Party TD Dan Desmond. The by-election was won by Desmond's widow Eileen, but at the 1965 general election in April that year Creed won the fourth seat in the four-seat constituency.

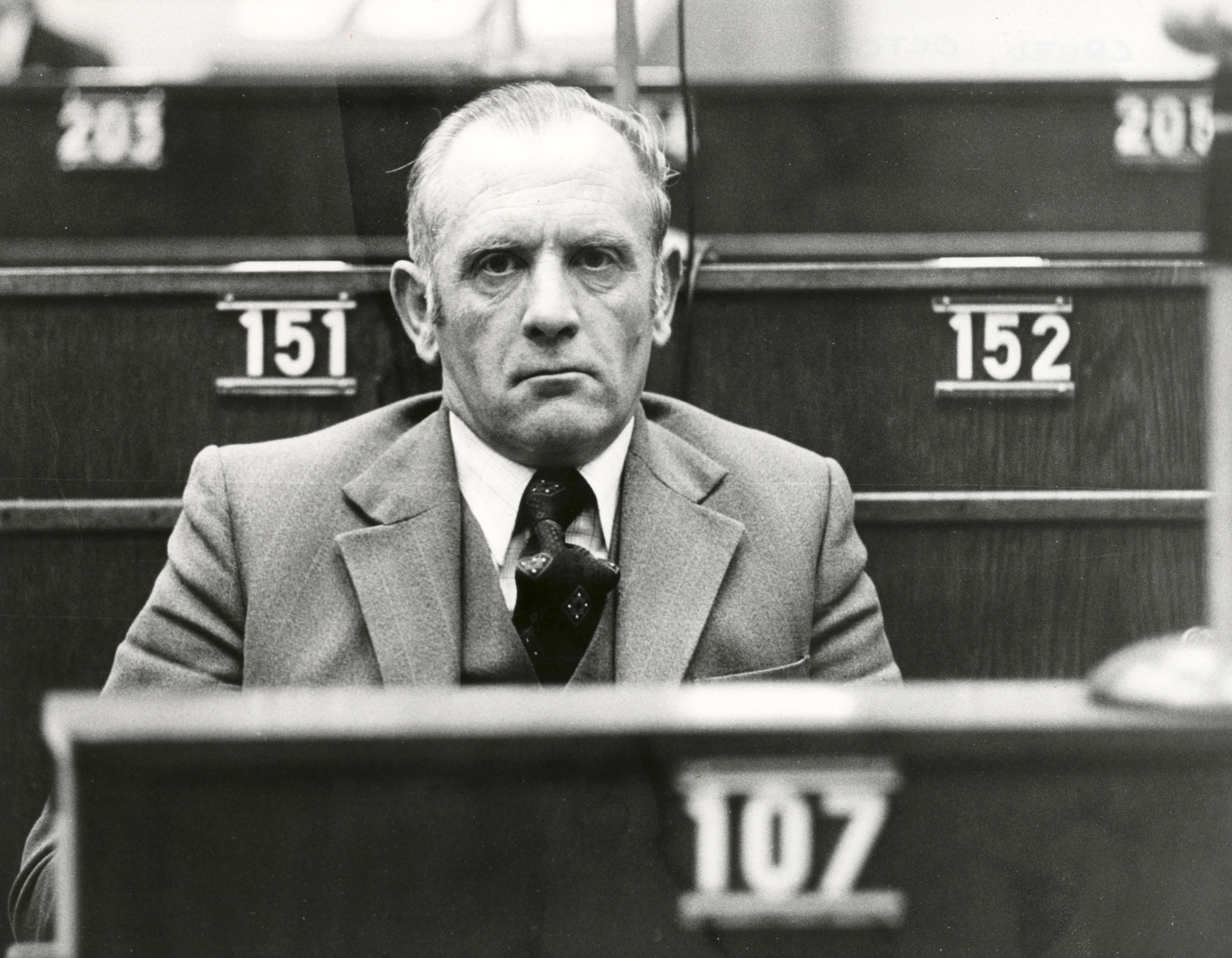
Creed in 1974

Creed was re-elected at seven further general elections, moving in 1981 to the new Cork North-West constituency when Cork Mid was abolished in boundary changes. From 1973 to 1977, he served as one of Ireland's first Members of the European Parliament (MEP), before MEPs were directly elected. Creed served on three of the European Parliament's committees: Agriculture, Public Health and the Environment, Regional Policy and Transport. He was also Chair of Cork County Council from 1978 to 1979.

In Garret FitzGerald's first coalition government, Creed was appointed as Minister of State at the Department of Health from June to November 1981, and then as Minister of State at the Department of the Environment from November 1981 until the government was defeated in a budget vote in January 1982. Fianna Fáil was returned to power at the resulting February 1982 general election, but that government also was short-lived. When FitzGerald formed a second coalition government after another general election in November 1982, Creed was appointed Minister of State at the Department of Education on 16 December 1982. He held that post until he was dismissed from office as part of a reshuffle in February 1986.

He served as Chair of the Fine Gael parliamentary party from 1987 to 1989. He stepped down from the Dáil at the 1989 general election, when his son Michael Creed held the seat for Fine Gael.

Party political offices
Preceded by Kieran Crotty	Chair of the Fine Gael parliamentary party 1987–1989	Succeeded by Tom Enright

Dáil	Election	Deputy (Party)	Deputy (Party)	Deputy (Party)	Deputy (Party)	Deputy (Party)
17th	1961	Dan Desmond (Lab)	Seán McCarthy (FF)	Con Meaney (FF)	Denis J. O'Sullivan (FG)	4 seats 1961–1977
17th	1965 by-election	Eileen Desmond (Lab)	Seán McCarthy (FF)	Con Meaney (FF)	Denis J. O'Sullivan (FG)	4 seats 1961–1977
18th	1965	Eileen Desmond (Lab)	Flor Crowley (FF)	Thomas Meaney (FF)	Donal Creed (FG)	4 seats 1961–1977
19th	1969	Philip Burton (FG)	Paddy Forde (FF)	Thomas Meaney (FF)	Donal Creed (FG)	4 seats 1961–1977
19th	1972 by-election	Philip Burton (FG)	Gene Fitzgerald (FF)	Thomas Meaney (FF)	Donal Creed (FG)	4 seats 1961–1977
20th	1973	Eileen Desmond (Lab)	Gene Fitzgerald (FF)	Thomas Meaney (FF)	Donal Creed (FG)	4 seats 1961–1977
21st	1977	Eileen Desmond (Lab)	Gene Fitzgerald (FF)	Thomas Meaney (FF)	Donal Creed (FG)	Barry Cogan (FF)
22nd	1981	Constituency abolished. See Cork North-Central and Cork South-Central				

Dáil	Election	Deputy (Party)	Deputy (Party)	Deputy (Party)
22nd	1981	Thomas Meaney (FF)	Frank Crowley (FG)	Donal Creed (FG)
23rd	1982 (Feb)	Thomas Meaney (FF)	Frank Crowley (FG)	Donal Creed (FG)
24th	1982 (Nov)	Donal Moynihan (FF)	Frank Crowley (FG)	Donal Creed (FG)
25th	1987	Donal Moynihan (FF)	Frank Crowley (FG)	Donal Creed (FG)
26th	1989	Laurence Kelly (FF)	Frank Crowley (FG)	Michael Creed (FG)
27th	1992	Donal Moynihan (FF)	Frank Crowley (FG)	Michael Creed (FG)
28th	1997	Donal Moynihan (FF)	Michael Moynihan (FF)	Michael Creed (FG)
29th	2002	Donal Moynihan (FF)	Michael Moynihan (FF)	Gerard Murphy (FG)
30th	2007	Batt O'Keeffe (FF)	Michael Moynihan (FF)	Michael Creed (FG)
31st	2011	Áine Collins (FG)	Michael Moynihan (FF)	Michael Creed (FG)
32nd	2016	Aindrias Moynihan (FF)	Michael Moynihan (FF)	Michael Creed (FG)
33rd	2020	Aindrias Moynihan (FF)	Michael Moynihan (FF)	Michael Creed (FG)
34th	2024	Aindrias Moynihan (FF)	Michael Moynihan (FF)	John Paul O'Shea (FG)
