= Alexis Belton =

American World Long Drive competitor

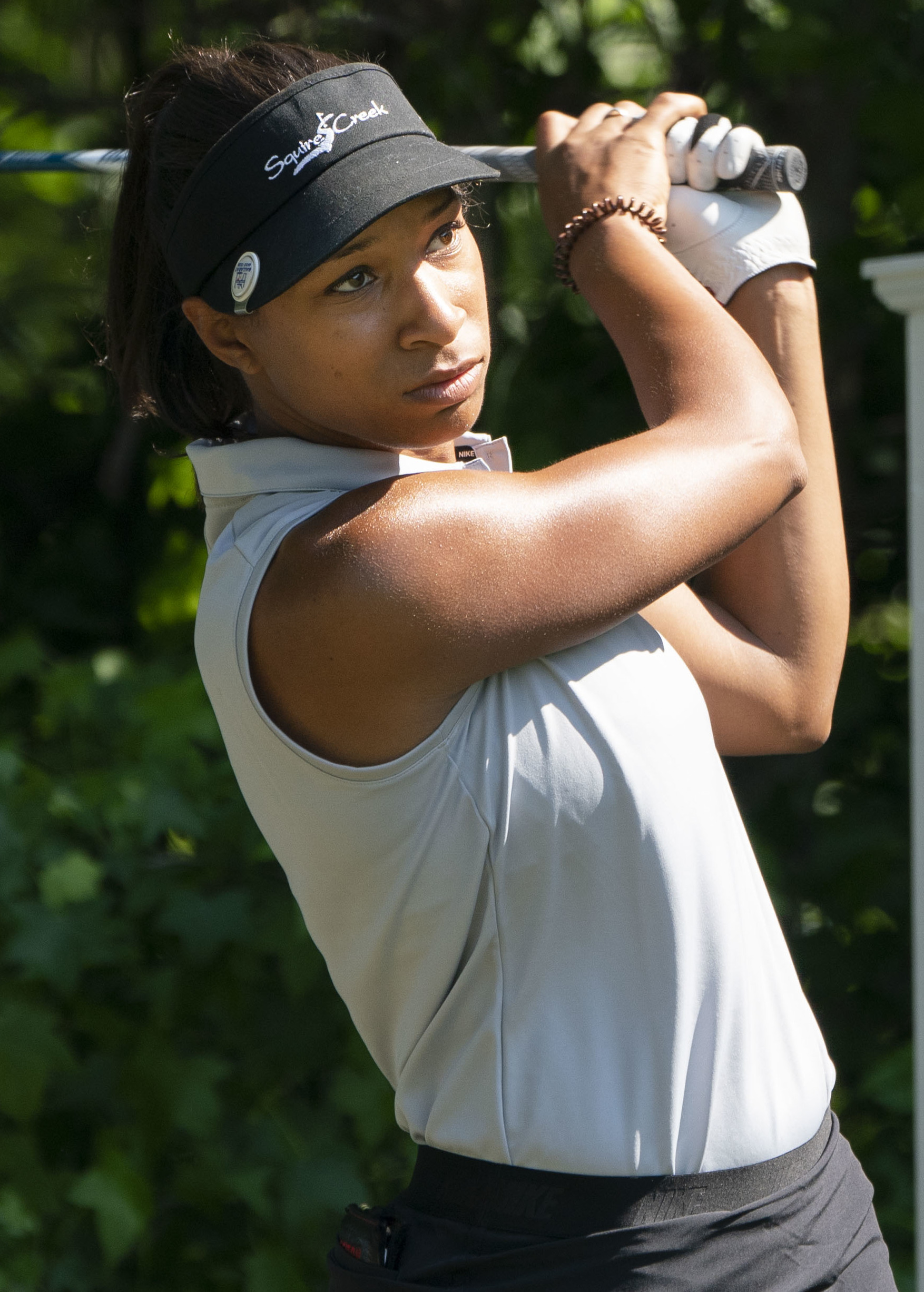
Alexis Belton in 2019

Alexis Belton (born June 9, 1993) is a World Long Drive competitor from Ruston, La. Belton competes in events that are sanctioned by the World Long Drive Association, which is owned by Golf Channel, part of the NBC Sports Group, and a division of Comcast. The season-long schedule features events airing live on Golf Channel, culminating in the Volvik World Long Drive Championship in September.

== World Long Drive career ==
Belton earned her first World Long Drive Tour event victory at the 2018 Clash in the Canyon (Nevada), and also finished runner-up at the Tennessee Big Shots benefiting Niswonger Children's Hospital, which both aired live on Golf Channel. In 2017, Belton reached the semifinals at the Volvik World Long Drive Championship (Oklahoma) in her first-ever competition.

In 2018, Belton competed in four WLD events and placed no lower than the quarterfinals, with one runner-up finish and one title. That title – at the Clash in the Canyon – came in just her second-ever WLD competition.

== Before World Long Drive ==
Prior to competing in World Long Drive, Belton competed for three years on the women's golf team at Texas Wesleyan University, where she also won the PGA Minority Tournament during her sophomore year. She earned All-America status at Texas Wesleyan in 2015, the first player in the three-year history of the program to claim that honor.
