= Bellton, West Virginia =

Unincorporated community in West Virginia, United States

Bellton
- Unincorporated community
- Location within the state of West Virginia Bellton (the United States)
- Coordinates: 39°45′23″N 80°33′19″W
- Country: United States
- State: West Virginia
- County: Marshall
- Elevation: 938 ft (286 m)
- Time zone: UTC-5 (Eastern (EST))
  - Summer (DST): UTC-4 (EDT)
- GNIS ID: 1553851

Bellton is an unincorporated community in Marshall County, West Virginia, United States. It was also known as Denver or Denver Station.

The community was named in honor of John Bell.
