= Ray Belton =

American academic administrator

President of Southern University
- In office 2015–2022
- Preceded by: Ronald Mason Jr.
- Succeeded by: Dennis J. Shields

Personal details
- Spouse: Norma Belton
- Education: Southern University; University of Nebraska–Lincoln; University of Texas at Austin

Ray Belton is an American academic administrator. He served as the president-chancellor of Southern University, a historically black public university in Baton Rouge, Louisiana from 2015-2022.

== Early life ==
Belton graduated from Southern University, where he earned a bachelor's degree. He earned a master's degree in counseling from the University of Nebraska–Lincoln and a Ph.D. in educational administration from the University of Texas at Austin.

== Career ==
Belton began his career in academia as an assistant professor at his alma mater, Southern University.

Belton served as the chancellor of the Southern University at Shreveport from 2000 to 2015. Under his leadership, "enrollment [...] increased by 156 percent and graduation rates have doubled."

Since 2015, Belton has served as the president-chancellor of Southern University in Baton Rouge.

== Personal life ==
Belton is married to Norma Belton.
