= Kathy Sheridan =

Journalist for The Irish Times

Kathy Sheridan is a journalist with The Irish Times.

She won the title of features writer at the National Newspapers of Ireland's Journalism Awards for 2011.

Her father Joe Sheridan was an independent TD for Longford–Westmeath from 1961 to 1981. Her daughter, Mary-Kate, is a musician, best known as the lead singer in rock band Fight Like Apes.

In 2012, she wrote about tens of thousands of Irish women who travelled abroad for their abortions.

== Book ==
- McDonald, Frank; Sheridan, Kathy (2008). The Builders. Penguin. ISBN 978-0-141-03780-6.
