= Lorcan Robbins =

Irish politician (1884–1939)

Teachta Dála
- In office May 1921 – June 1922
- Constituency: Longford–Westmeath

Personal details
- Born: 16 May 1884 Moate, County Westmeath, Ireland
- Died: 9 January 1939 (aged 54) County Westmeath, Ireland
- Party: Sinn Féin

Lorcan Robbins (also called Laurence and/or Robins) (born 16 May 1884 – 9 January 1939) was an Irish Sinn Féin activist and politician. He was the son of Laurence Dalton Robins, a farmer from Tullaghnageeragh near Moate in County Westmeath, who worked undercover for Sinn Féin under the alias "Richard Dalton".

When the First Dáil established the separatist Irish Republic in 1919, the younger Robbins worked in the Dáil government's Department of Finance. He was nominated as a Sinn Féin candidate in the Longford–Westmeath constituency at the 1921 general election. Arthur Griffith suggested that, if elected, he be excused attendance at the Dáil in order to continue working for the Department of Finance; Michael Collins overruled Griffith. Robbins and the other Sinn Féin candidates were returned unopposed as TDs to the Second Dáil.

On 7 January 1922, he voted in favour of the Anglo-Irish Treaty. On 11 January he was appointed Assistant Minister for Local Government in the post-Treaty Dáil government, although this appointment was never ratified by the Dáil. He lost his Dáil seat at the 1922 general election, although he remained an Assistant Minister until the Dáil government was merged with the Provisional Government in September.

Dáil	Election	Deputy (Party)	Deputy (Party)	Deputy (Party)	Deputy (Party)	Deputy (Party)
2nd	1921	Lorcan Robbins (SF)	Seán Mac Eoin (SF)	Joseph McGuinness (SF)	Laurence Ginnell (SF)	4 seats 1921–1923
3rd	1922	John Lyons (Lab)	Seán Mac Eoin (PT-SF)	Francis McGuinness (PT-SF)	Laurence Ginnell (AT-SF)	4 seats 1921–1923
4th	1923	John Lyons (Ind.)	Conor Byrne (Rep)	James Killane (Rep)	Patrick Shaw (CnaG)	Patrick McKenna (FP)
5th	1927 (Jun)	Henry Broderick (Lab)	Michael Kennedy (FF)	James Victory (FF)	Patrick Shaw (CnaG)	Hugh Garahan (FP)
6th	1927 (Sep)	Henry Broderick (Lab)	Michael Kennedy (FF)	James Killane (FF)	Patrick Shaw (CnaG)	Michael Connolly (CnaG)
6th	1930 by-election	Henry Broderick (Lab)	Michael Kennedy (FF)	James Geoghegan (FF)	Patrick Shaw (CnaG)	Michael Connolly (CnaG)
7th	1932	Francis Gormley (FF)	Michael Kennedy (FF)	James Geoghegan (FF)	Patrick Shaw (CnaG)	Seán Mac Eoin (CnaG)
8th	1933	James Victory (FF)	Michael Kennedy (FF)	James Geoghegan (FF)	Charles Fagan (NCP)	Seán Mac Eoin (CnaG)
9th	1937	Constituency abolished. See Athlone–Longford and Meath–Westmeath				

Dáil	Election	Deputy (Party)	Deputy (Party)	Deputy (Party)	Deputy (Party)	Deputy (Party)
13th	1948	Erskine H. Childers (FF)	Thomas Carter (FF)	Michael Kennedy (FF)	Seán Mac Eoin (FG)	Charles Fagan (Ind.)
14th	1951	Erskine H. Childers (FF)	Frank Carter (FF)	Michael Kennedy (FF)	Seán Mac Eoin (FG)	Charles Fagan (Ind.)
15th	1954	Erskine H. Childers (FF)	Frank Carter (FF)	Michael Kennedy (FF)	Seán Mac Eoin (FG)	Charles Fagan (FG)
16th	1957	Erskine H. Childers (FF)	Ruairí Ó Brádaigh (SF)	Michael Kennedy (FF)	Seán Mac Eoin (FG)	Charles Fagan (FG)
17th	1961	Frank Carter (FF)	Joe Sheridan (Ind.)	Michael Kennedy (FF)	Seán Mac Eoin (FG)	4 seats 1961–1992
18th	1965	Frank Carter (FF)	Joe Sheridan (Ind.)	Patrick Lenihan (FF)	Gerry L'Estrange (FG)	4 seats 1961–1992
19th	1969	Frank Carter (FF)	Joe Sheridan (Ind.)	Patrick Lenihan (FF)	Gerry L'Estrange (FG)	4 seats 1961–1992
19th	1970 by-election	Frank Carter (FF)	Joe Sheridan (Ind.)	Patrick Cooney (FG)	Gerry L'Estrange (FG)	4 seats 1961–1992
20th	1973	Frank Carter (FF)	Joe Sheridan (Ind.)	Patrick Cooney (FG)	Gerry L'Estrange (FG)	4 seats 1961–1992
21st	1977	Albert Reynolds (FF)	Joe Sheridan (Ind.)	Seán Keegan (FF)	Gerry L'Estrange (FG)	4 seats 1961–1992
22nd	1981	Albert Reynolds (FF)	Patrick Cooney (FG)	Seán Keegan (FF)	Gerry L'Estrange (FG)	4 seats 1961–1992
23rd	1982 (Feb)	Albert Reynolds (FF)	Patrick Cooney (FG)	Seán Keegan (FF)	Gerry L'Estrange (FG)	4 seats 1961–1992
24th	1982 (Nov)	Albert Reynolds (FF)	Patrick Cooney (FG)	Mary O'Rourke (FF)	Gerry L'Estrange (FG)	4 seats 1961–1992
25th	1987	Albert Reynolds (FF)	Patrick Cooney (FG)	Mary O'Rourke (FF)	Henry Abbott (FF)	4 seats 1961–1992
26th	1989	Albert Reynolds (FF)	Louis Belton (FG)	Mary O'Rourke (FF)	Paul McGrath (FG)	4 seats 1961–1992
27th	1992	Constituency abolished. See Longford–Roscommon and Westmeath				

Dáil	Election	Deputy (Party)	Deputy (Party)	Deputy (Party)	Deputy (Party)	Deputy (Party)
30th	2007	Willie Penrose (Lab)	Peter Kelly (FF)	Mary O'Rourke (FF)	James Bannon (FG)	4 seats 2007–2024
31st	2011	Willie Penrose (Lab)	Robert Troy (FF)	Nicky McFadden (FG)	James Bannon (FG)	4 seats 2007–2024
31st	2014 by-election	Willie Penrose (Lab)	Robert Troy (FF)	Gabrielle McFadden (FG)	James Bannon (FG)	4 seats 2007–2024
32nd	2016	Willie Penrose (Lab)	Robert Troy (FF)	Kevin "Boxer" Moran (Ind.)	Peter Burke (FG)	4 seats 2007–2024
33rd	2020	Sorca Clarke (SF)	Robert Troy (FF)	Joe Flaherty (FF)	Peter Burke (FG)	4 seats 2007–2024
34th	2024	Sorca Clarke (SF)	Robert Troy (FF)	Kevin "Boxer" Moran (Ind.)	Peter Burke (FG)	Micheál Carrigy (FG)
