= Seán Keegan =

Irish politician (1930–2007)

Teachta Dála
- In office June 1977 – November 1982
- Constituency: Longford–Westmeath

Senator
- In office 16 June 1970 – 16 June 1977
- Constituency: Administrative Panel

Personal details
- Born: 2 February 1930 County Westmeath, Ireland
- Died: 9 July 2007 (aged 77) County Westmeath, Ireland
- Party: Fianna Fáil
- Spouse: Mary Keegan
- Children: 5

Seán Keegan (2 February 1930 – 9 July 2007) was an Irish Fianna Fáil politician.

== Biography ==
A farmer from Kilbeggan, County Westmeath, his father had been active in the Irish War of Independence. He was elected to Westmeath County Council in 1955. He contested his first general election in 1965 at the behest of Seán Lemass. Keegan was elected to the 12th Seanad on 16 June 1970 at a by-election to the Administrative Panel. He was re-elected to the Seanad in 1973, having been an unsuccessful candidate at the 1973 general election.

At the 1977 general election, he was elected to the Dáil as a Fianna Fáil Teachta Dála (TD) for the Longford–Westmeath constituency, with his surplus votes helping to elect Albert Reynolds, also for the first time. He was re-elected twice, at the 1981 and the February 1982 general elections. He lost his seat at the November 1982 general election.

Dáil	Election	Deputy (Party)	Deputy (Party)	Deputy (Party)	Deputy (Party)	Deputy (Party)
2nd	1921	Lorcan Robbins (SF)	Seán Mac Eoin (SF)	Joseph McGuinness (SF)	Laurence Ginnell (SF)	4 seats 1921–1923
3rd	1922	John Lyons (Lab)	Seán Mac Eoin (PT-SF)	Francis McGuinness (PT-SF)	Laurence Ginnell (AT-SF)	4 seats 1921–1923
4th	1923	John Lyons (Ind.)	Conor Byrne (Rep)	James Killane (Rep)	Patrick Shaw (CnaG)	Patrick McKenna (FP)
5th	1927 (Jun)	Henry Broderick (Lab)	Michael Kennedy (FF)	James Victory (FF)	Patrick Shaw (CnaG)	Hugh Garahan (FP)
6th	1927 (Sep)	Henry Broderick (Lab)	Michael Kennedy (FF)	James Killane (FF)	Patrick Shaw (CnaG)	Michael Connolly (CnaG)
6th	1930 by-election	Henry Broderick (Lab)	Michael Kennedy (FF)	James Geoghegan (FF)	Patrick Shaw (CnaG)	Michael Connolly (CnaG)
7th	1932	Francis Gormley (FF)	Michael Kennedy (FF)	James Geoghegan (FF)	Patrick Shaw (CnaG)	Seán Mac Eoin (CnaG)
8th	1933	James Victory (FF)	Michael Kennedy (FF)	James Geoghegan (FF)	Charles Fagan (NCP)	Seán Mac Eoin (CnaG)
9th	1937	Constituency abolished. See Athlone–Longford and Meath–Westmeath				

Dáil	Election	Deputy (Party)	Deputy (Party)	Deputy (Party)	Deputy (Party)	Deputy (Party)
13th	1948	Erskine H. Childers (FF)	Thomas Carter (FF)	Michael Kennedy (FF)	Seán Mac Eoin (FG)	Charles Fagan (Ind.)
14th	1951	Erskine H. Childers (FF)	Frank Carter (FF)	Michael Kennedy (FF)	Seán Mac Eoin (FG)	Charles Fagan (Ind.)
15th	1954	Erskine H. Childers (FF)	Frank Carter (FF)	Michael Kennedy (FF)	Seán Mac Eoin (FG)	Charles Fagan (FG)
16th	1957	Erskine H. Childers (FF)	Ruairí Ó Brádaigh (SF)	Michael Kennedy (FF)	Seán Mac Eoin (FG)	Charles Fagan (FG)
17th	1961	Frank Carter (FF)	Joe Sheridan (Ind.)	Michael Kennedy (FF)	Seán Mac Eoin (FG)	4 seats 1961–1992
18th	1965	Frank Carter (FF)	Joe Sheridan (Ind.)	Patrick Lenihan (FF)	Gerry L'Estrange (FG)	4 seats 1961–1992
19th	1969	Frank Carter (FF)	Joe Sheridan (Ind.)	Patrick Lenihan (FF)	Gerry L'Estrange (FG)	4 seats 1961–1992
19th	1970 by-election	Frank Carter (FF)	Joe Sheridan (Ind.)	Patrick Cooney (FG)	Gerry L'Estrange (FG)	4 seats 1961–1992
20th	1973	Frank Carter (FF)	Joe Sheridan (Ind.)	Patrick Cooney (FG)	Gerry L'Estrange (FG)	4 seats 1961–1992
21st	1977	Albert Reynolds (FF)	Joe Sheridan (Ind.)	Seán Keegan (FF)	Gerry L'Estrange (FG)	4 seats 1961–1992
22nd	1981	Albert Reynolds (FF)	Patrick Cooney (FG)	Seán Keegan (FF)	Gerry L'Estrange (FG)	4 seats 1961–1992
23rd	1982 (Feb)	Albert Reynolds (FF)	Patrick Cooney (FG)	Seán Keegan (FF)	Gerry L'Estrange (FG)	4 seats 1961–1992
24th	1982 (Nov)	Albert Reynolds (FF)	Patrick Cooney (FG)	Mary O'Rourke (FF)	Gerry L'Estrange (FG)	4 seats 1961–1992
25th	1987	Albert Reynolds (FF)	Patrick Cooney (FG)	Mary O'Rourke (FF)	Henry Abbott (FF)	4 seats 1961–1992
26th	1989	Albert Reynolds (FF)	Louis Belton (FG)	Mary O'Rourke (FF)	Paul McGrath (FG)	4 seats 1961–1992
27th	1992	Constituency abolished. See Longford–Roscommon and Westmeath				

Dáil	Election	Deputy (Party)	Deputy (Party)	Deputy (Party)	Deputy (Party)	Deputy (Party)
30th	2007	Willie Penrose (Lab)	Peter Kelly (FF)	Mary O'Rourke (FF)	James Bannon (FG)	4 seats 2007–2024
31st	2011	Willie Penrose (Lab)	Robert Troy (FF)	Nicky McFadden (FG)	James Bannon (FG)	4 seats 2007–2024
31st	2014 by-election	Willie Penrose (Lab)	Robert Troy (FF)	Gabrielle McFadden (FG)	James Bannon (FG)	4 seats 2007–2024
32nd	2016	Willie Penrose (Lab)	Robert Troy (FF)	Kevin "Boxer" Moran (Ind.)	Peter Burke (FG)	4 seats 2007–2024
33rd	2020	Sorca Clarke (SF)	Robert Troy (FF)	Joe Flaherty (FF)	Peter Burke (FG)	4 seats 2007–2024
34th	2024	Sorca Clarke (SF)	Robert Troy (FF)	Kevin "Boxer" Moran (Ind.)	Peter Burke (FG)	Micheál Carrigy (FG)
