= Patrick McKenna (Irish politician) =

Irish politician

Teachta Dála
- In office August 1923 – June 1927
- Constituency: Longford–Westmeath

Personal details
- Party: Farmers' Party

Patrick McKenna was an Irish politician and farmer. He was first elected to Dáil Éireann at the 1923 general election as a Farmers' Party Teachta Dála (TD) for the Longford–Westmeath constituency.

He lost his seat at the June 1927 general election. He left the party in opposition to a voting pact with Cumann na nGaedheal and was an unsuccessful independent candidate at the September 1927 general election.

| Dáil | Election | Deputy (Party) | Deputy (Party) | Deputy (Party) | Deputy (Party) | Deputy (Party) |
|---|---|---|---|---|---|---|
| 2nd | 1921 | Lorcan Robbins (SF) | Seán Mac Eoin (SF) | Joseph McGuinness (SF) | Laurence Ginnell (SF) | 4 seats 1921–1923 |
| 3rd | 1922 | John Lyons (Lab) | Seán Mac Eoin (PT-SF) | Francis McGuinness (PT-SF) | Laurence Ginnell (AT-SF) | 4 seats 1921–1923 |
| 4th | 1923 | John Lyons (Ind.) | Conor Byrne (Rep) | James Killane (Rep) | Patrick Shaw (CnaG) | Patrick McKenna (FP) |
| 5th | 1927 (Jun) | Henry Broderick (Lab) | Michael Kennedy (FF) | James Victory (FF) | Patrick Shaw (CnaG) | Hugh Garahan (FP) |
| 6th | 1927 (Sep) | Henry Broderick (Lab) | Michael Kennedy (FF) | James Killane (FF) | Patrick Shaw (CnaG) | Michael Connolly (CnaG) |
| 6th | 1930 by-election | Henry Broderick (Lab) | Michael Kennedy (FF) | James Geoghegan (FF) | Patrick Shaw (CnaG) | Michael Connolly (CnaG) |
| 7th | 1932 | Francis Gormley (FF) | Michael Kennedy (FF) | James Geoghegan (FF) | Patrick Shaw (CnaG) | Seán Mac Eoin (CnaG) |
| 8th | 1933 | James Victory (FF) | Michael Kennedy (FF) | James Geoghegan (FF) | Charles Fagan (NCP) | Seán Mac Eoin (CnaG) |
| 9th | 1937 | Constituency abolished. See Athlone–Longford and Meath–Westmeath | | | | |

| Dáil | Election | Deputy (Party) | Deputy (Party) | Deputy (Party) | Deputy (Party) | Deputy (Party) |
|---|---|---|---|---|---|---|
| 13th | 1948 | Erskine H. Childers (FF) | Thomas Carter (FF) | Michael Kennedy (FF) | Seán Mac Eoin (FG) | Charles Fagan (Ind.) |
| 14th | 1951 | Erskine H. Childers (FF) | Frank Carter (FF) | Michael Kennedy (FF) | Seán Mac Eoin (FG) | Charles Fagan (Ind.) |
| 15th | 1954 | Erskine H. Childers (FF) | Frank Carter (FF) | Michael Kennedy (FF) | Seán Mac Eoin (FG) | Charles Fagan (FG) |
| 16th | 1957 | Erskine H. Childers (FF) | Ruairí Ó Brádaigh (SF) | Michael Kennedy (FF) | Seán Mac Eoin (FG) | Charles Fagan (FG) |
| 17th | 1961 | Frank Carter (FF) | Joe Sheridan (Ind.) | Michael Kennedy (FF) | Seán Mac Eoin (FG) | 4 seats 1961–1992 |
| 18th | 1965 | Frank Carter (FF) | Joe Sheridan (Ind.) | Patrick Lenihan (FF) | Gerry L'Estrange (FG) | 4 seats 1961–1992 |
| 19th | 1969 | Frank Carter (FF) | Joe Sheridan (Ind.) | Patrick Lenihan (FF) | Gerry L'Estrange (FG) | 4 seats 1961–1992 |
| 19th | 1970 by-election | Frank Carter (FF) | Joe Sheridan (Ind.) | Patrick Cooney (FG) | Gerry L'Estrange (FG) | 4 seats 1961–1992 |
| 20th | 1973 | Frank Carter (FF) | Joe Sheridan (Ind.) | Patrick Cooney (FG) | Gerry L'Estrange (FG) | 4 seats 1961–1992 |
| 21st | 1977 | Albert Reynolds (FF) | Joe Sheridan (Ind.) | Seán Keegan (FF) | Gerry L'Estrange (FG) | 4 seats 1961–1992 |
| 22nd | 1981 | Albert Reynolds (FF) | Patrick Cooney (FG) | Seán Keegan (FF) | Gerry L'Estrange (FG) | 4 seats 1961–1992 |
| 23rd | 1982 (Feb) | Albert Reynolds (FF) | Patrick Cooney (FG) | Seán Keegan (FF) | Gerry L'Estrange (FG) | 4 seats 1961–1992 |
| 24th | 1982 (Nov) | Albert Reynolds (FF) | Patrick Cooney (FG) | Mary O'Rourke (FF) | Gerry L'Estrange (FG) | 4 seats 1961–1992 |
| 25th | 1987 | Albert Reynolds (FF) | Patrick Cooney (FG) | Mary O'Rourke (FF) | Henry Abbott (FF) | 4 seats 1961–1992 |
| 26th | 1989 | Albert Reynolds (FF) | Louis Belton (FG) | Mary O'Rourke (FF) | Paul McGrath (FG) | 4 seats 1961–1992 |
| 27th | 1992 | Constituency abolished. See Longford–Roscommon and Westmeath | | | | |

| Dáil | Election | Deputy (Party) | Deputy (Party) | Deputy (Party) | Deputy (Party) | Deputy (Party) |
|---|---|---|---|---|---|---|
| 30th | 2007 | Willie Penrose (Lab) | Peter Kelly (FF) | Mary O'Rourke (FF) | James Bannon (FG) | 4 seats 2007–2024 |
| 31st | 2011 | Willie Penrose (Lab) | Robert Troy (FF) | Nicky McFadden (FG) | James Bannon (FG) | 4 seats 2007–2024 |
| 31st | 2014 by-election | Willie Penrose (Lab) | Robert Troy (FF) | Gabrielle McFadden (FG) | James Bannon (FG) | 4 seats 2007–2024 |
| 32nd | 2016 | Willie Penrose (Lab) | Robert Troy (FF) | Kevin "Boxer" Moran (Ind.) | Peter Burke (FG) | 4 seats 2007–2024 |
| 33rd | 2020 | Sorca Clarke (SF) | Robert Troy (FF) | Joe Flaherty (FF) | Peter Burke (FG) | 4 seats 2007–2024 |
| 34th | 2024 | Sorca Clarke (SF) | Robert Troy (FF) | Kevin "Boxer" Moran (Ind.) | Peter Burke (FG) | Micheál Carrigy (FG) |
