= Henry Abbott (Irish judge) =

Irish former politician and High Court judge (born 1947)

Judge of the High Court
- In office 20 July 2002 – 18 December 2017
- Nominated by: Government of Ireland
- Appointed by: Mary McAleese

Teachta Dála
- In office February 1987 – June 1989
- Constituency: Longford–Westmeath

Personal details
- Born: 18 December 1947 (age 78) Athlone, County Westmeath, Ireland
- Party: Fianna Fáil
- Education: University College Dublin; King's Inns

Henry Abbott (born 18 December 1947) is a retired Irish judge and politician who served as a judge of the High Court from 2002 to 2017.

Abbot is from Mullingar, County Westmeah, and was a barrister and farmer, before entering politics. He was a member of Westmeath County Council from 1985 to 1999. He served as a Fianna Fáil Teachta Dála (TD) for the Longford–Westmeath constituency from 1987 to 1989. He received 8,035 (17.8%) first-preference votes at the 1987 general election, taking the second seat in the constituency, and Fianna Fáil taking three out of four seats in Longford–Westmeath.

Abbott lost his Dáil seat at the 1989 general election. In 1989, he received 6,733 (15.9%) first-preference votes, with Fianna Fáil taking two seats and Fine Gael taking the remaining two seats. He was an unsuccessful candidate for the Westmeath constituency at the 1992 and 1997 general elections. He was also an unsuccessful candidate at the 1997 Seanad Éireann election.

After politics, he returned to practicing law, and was appointed as a High Court judge in 2002. In 2013, he was involved in a controversy relating to a conversation between two judges about to a family law case. He retired from the High Court in 2017.

Dáil	Election	Deputy (Party)	Deputy (Party)	Deputy (Party)	Deputy (Party)	Deputy (Party)
2nd	1921	Lorcan Robbins (SF)	Seán Mac Eoin (SF)	Joseph McGuinness (SF)	Laurence Ginnell (SF)	4 seats 1921–1923
3rd	1922	John Lyons (Lab)	Seán Mac Eoin (PT-SF)	Francis McGuinness (PT-SF)	Laurence Ginnell (AT-SF)	4 seats 1921–1923
4th	1923	John Lyons (Ind.)	Conor Byrne (Rep)	James Killane (Rep)	Patrick Shaw (CnaG)	Patrick McKenna (FP)
5th	1927 (Jun)	Henry Broderick (Lab)	Michael Kennedy (FF)	James Victory (FF)	Patrick Shaw (CnaG)	Hugh Garahan (FP)
6th	1927 (Sep)	Henry Broderick (Lab)	Michael Kennedy (FF)	James Killane (FF)	Patrick Shaw (CnaG)	Michael Connolly (CnaG)
6th	1930 by-election	Henry Broderick (Lab)	Michael Kennedy (FF)	James Geoghegan (FF)	Patrick Shaw (CnaG)	Michael Connolly (CnaG)
7th	1932	Francis Gormley (FF)	Michael Kennedy (FF)	James Geoghegan (FF)	Patrick Shaw (CnaG)	Seán Mac Eoin (CnaG)
8th	1933	James Victory (FF)	Michael Kennedy (FF)	James Geoghegan (FF)	Charles Fagan (NCP)	Seán Mac Eoin (CnaG)
9th	1937	Constituency abolished. See Athlone–Longford and Meath–Westmeath				

Dáil	Election	Deputy (Party)	Deputy (Party)	Deputy (Party)	Deputy (Party)	Deputy (Party)
13th	1948	Erskine H. Childers (FF)	Thomas Carter (FF)	Michael Kennedy (FF)	Seán Mac Eoin (FG)	Charles Fagan (Ind.)
14th	1951	Erskine H. Childers (FF)	Frank Carter (FF)	Michael Kennedy (FF)	Seán Mac Eoin (FG)	Charles Fagan (Ind.)
15th	1954	Erskine H. Childers (FF)	Frank Carter (FF)	Michael Kennedy (FF)	Seán Mac Eoin (FG)	Charles Fagan (FG)
16th	1957	Erskine H. Childers (FF)	Ruairí Ó Brádaigh (SF)	Michael Kennedy (FF)	Seán Mac Eoin (FG)	Charles Fagan (FG)
17th	1961	Frank Carter (FF)	Joe Sheridan (Ind.)	Michael Kennedy (FF)	Seán Mac Eoin (FG)	4 seats 1961–1992
18th	1965	Frank Carter (FF)	Joe Sheridan (Ind.)	Patrick Lenihan (FF)	Gerry L'Estrange (FG)	4 seats 1961–1992
19th	1969	Frank Carter (FF)	Joe Sheridan (Ind.)	Patrick Lenihan (FF)	Gerry L'Estrange (FG)	4 seats 1961–1992
19th	1970 by-election	Frank Carter (FF)	Joe Sheridan (Ind.)	Patrick Cooney (FG)	Gerry L'Estrange (FG)	4 seats 1961–1992
20th	1973	Frank Carter (FF)	Joe Sheridan (Ind.)	Patrick Cooney (FG)	Gerry L'Estrange (FG)	4 seats 1961–1992
21st	1977	Albert Reynolds (FF)	Joe Sheridan (Ind.)	Seán Keegan (FF)	Gerry L'Estrange (FG)	4 seats 1961–1992
22nd	1981	Albert Reynolds (FF)	Patrick Cooney (FG)	Seán Keegan (FF)	Gerry L'Estrange (FG)	4 seats 1961–1992
23rd	1982 (Feb)	Albert Reynolds (FF)	Patrick Cooney (FG)	Seán Keegan (FF)	Gerry L'Estrange (FG)	4 seats 1961–1992
24th	1982 (Nov)	Albert Reynolds (FF)	Patrick Cooney (FG)	Mary O'Rourke (FF)	Gerry L'Estrange (FG)	4 seats 1961–1992
25th	1987	Albert Reynolds (FF)	Patrick Cooney (FG)	Mary O'Rourke (FF)	Henry Abbott (FF)	4 seats 1961–1992
26th	1989	Albert Reynolds (FF)	Louis Belton (FG)	Mary O'Rourke (FF)	Paul McGrath (FG)	4 seats 1961–1992
27th	1992	Constituency abolished. See Longford–Roscommon and Westmeath				

Dáil	Election	Deputy (Party)	Deputy (Party)	Deputy (Party)	Deputy (Party)	Deputy (Party)
30th	2007	Willie Penrose (Lab)	Peter Kelly (FF)	Mary O'Rourke (FF)	James Bannon (FG)	4 seats 2007–2024
31st	2011	Willie Penrose (Lab)	Robert Troy (FF)	Nicky McFadden (FG)	James Bannon (FG)	4 seats 2007–2024
31st	2014 by-election	Willie Penrose (Lab)	Robert Troy (FF)	Gabrielle McFadden (FG)	James Bannon (FG)	4 seats 2007–2024
32nd	2016	Willie Penrose (Lab)	Robert Troy (FF)	Kevin "Boxer" Moran (Ind.)	Peter Burke (FG)	4 seats 2007–2024
33rd	2020	Sorca Clarke (SF)	Robert Troy (FF)	Joe Flaherty (FF)	Peter Burke (FG)	4 seats 2007–2024
34th	2024	Sorca Clarke (SF)	Robert Troy (FF)	Kevin "Boxer" Moran (Ind.)	Peter Burke (FG)	Micheál Carrigy (FG)
