= Longford–Westmeath =

Dáil constituency (1921–1937, 1948–1992, 2007–present)

- Dáil constituency
- Location of Longford–Westmeath within Ireland
- Interactive map of constituency boundaries since the 2024 general election
- Major settlements: Athlone; Edgeworthstown; Kinnegad; Longford; Moate; Mullingar

Current constituency
- Created: 2007
- Seats: 4 (2007–2024); 5 (2024–)
- TDs: Peter Burke (FG); Micheál Carrigy (FG); Sorca Clarke (SF); Kevin "Boxer" Moran (Ind); Robert Troy (FF)
- Local government areas: County Longford; County Westmeath
- Created from: Longford–Roscommon; Westmeath
- EP constituency: Midlands–North-West

Longford–Westmeath
- Former Dáil constituency

Former constituency
- Created: 1948
- Abolished: 1992
- Seats: 5 (1948–1961); 4 (1961–1992)
- Local government areas: County Longford; County Westmeath
- Created from: Athlone–Longford; Meath–Westmeath
- Replaced by: Longford–Roscommon; Westmeath

Longford–Westmeath
- Former Dáil constituency

Former constituency
- Created: 1921
- Abolished: 1937
- Seats: 4 (1921–1923); 5 (1923–1937)
- Local government areas: County Longford; County Westmeath
- Created from: County Longford; County Westmeath
- Replaced by: Athlone–Longford; Meath–Westmeath

Longford–Westmeath is a parliamentary constituency represented in Dáil Éireann, the lower house of the Irish parliament or Oireachtas. The constituency elects five deputies (Teachtaí Dála, commonly known as TDs) on the system of proportional representation by means of the single transferable vote (PR-STV). It contains all of County Longford and County Westmeath.

== History and boundaries ==
The constituency existed from 1921 to 1937 and from 1948 to 1992, but was abolished for the 1992 general election. It was re-created by the Electoral (Amendment) Act 2005 which gave effect to the 2004 Constituency Commission Report on Dáil Constituencies, and has been in use since the 2007 general election.

From 2007 until 2024, it was a four-seat constituency, with part of County Westmeath around Castlepollard and Delvin in the Meath West constituency. It was then defined as:

The Electoral (Amendment) Act 2023 defines the constituency as:

"The county of Longford and the county of Westmeath."

In the Constituency Review Report 2023, the Electoral Commission recommended that the electoral divisions of Westmeath in the Meath West constituency should be transferred to Longford–Westmeath, thereby making the constituency comprise the entire counties of Longford and Westmeath for the first time since 1981. It was also allocated an additional seat to become a five-seat constituency.

== TDs ==
=== TDs 1921–1937 ===
Teachtaí Dála (TDs) for Longford–Westmeath 1921–1937
Key to parties: CnaG = Cumann na nGaedheal; FP = Farmers' Party; FF = Fianna Fáil; Ind. = Independent; Lab = Labour; NCP = National Centre Party; Rep = Republican; SF = Sinn Féin; AT-SF = Sinn Féin (Anti-Treaty); PT-SF = Sinn Féin (Pro-Treaty)
Dáil	Election	Deputy (Party)	Deputy (Party)	Deputy (Party)	Deputy (Party)	Deputy (Party)
2nd	1921	Lorcan Robbins (SF)	Seán Mac Eoin (SF)	Joseph McGuinness (SF)	Laurence Ginnell (SF)	4 seats 1921–1923
3rd	1922	John Lyons (Lab)	Seán Mac Eoin (PT-SF)	Francis McGuinness (PT-SF)	Laurence Ginnell (AT-SF)	4 seats 1921–1923
4th	1923	John Lyons (Ind.)	Conor Byrne (Rep)	James Killane (Note: James Killane was elected as a Republican candidate of anti-Treaty rump of Sinn Féin, but joined Fianna Fáil when it split from Sinn Féin in 1926.) (Rep)	Patrick Shaw (CnaG)	Patrick McKenna (FP)
5th	1927 (Jun)	Henry Broderick (Lab)	Michael Kennedy (FF)	James Victory (FF)	Patrick Shaw (CnaG)	Hugh Garahan (FP)
6th	1927 (Sep)	Henry Broderick (Lab)	Michael Kennedy (FF)	James Killane (FF)	Patrick Shaw (CnaG)	Michael Connolly (CnaG)
6th	1930 by-election	Henry Broderick (Lab)	Michael Kennedy (FF)	James Geoghegan (FF)	Patrick Shaw (CnaG)	Michael Connolly (CnaG)
7th	1932	Francis Gormley (FF)	Michael Kennedy (FF)	James Geoghegan (FF)	Patrick Shaw (CnaG)	Seán Mac Eoin (CnaG)
8th	1933	James Victory (FF)	Michael Kennedy (FF)	James Geoghegan (FF)	Charles Fagan (Note: Charles Fagan was elected as a candidate of the National Centre Party, became a Fine Gael TD on 8 September 1933 when Cumann na nGaedheal and the National Centre Party, along with the Army Comrades Association, merged to form the new Fine Gael party.) (NCP)	Seán Mac Eoin (CnaG)
9th	1937	Constituency abolished. See Athlone–Longford and Meath–Westmeath				

Note: The columns in this table are used only for presentational purposes, and no significance should be attached to the order of columns. For details of the order in which seats were won at each election, see the detailed results of that election.

=== TDs 1948–1992 ===
Teachtaí Dála (TDs) for Longford–Westmeath 1948–1992
Key to parties: FF = Fianna Fáil; FG = Fine Gael; Ind. = Independent; SF = Sinn Féin
Dáil	Election	Deputy (Party)	Deputy (Party)	Deputy (Party)	Deputy (Party)	Deputy (Party)
13th	1948	Erskine H. Childers (FF)	Thomas Carter (FF)	Michael Kennedy (FF)	Seán Mac Eoin (FG)	Charles Fagan (Ind.)
14th	1951	Erskine H. Childers (FF)	Frank Carter (FF)	Michael Kennedy (FF)	Seán Mac Eoin (FG)	Charles Fagan (Ind.)
15th	1954	Erskine H. Childers (FF)	Frank Carter (FF)	Michael Kennedy (FF)	Seán Mac Eoin (FG)	Charles Fagan (FG)
16th	1957	Erskine H. Childers (FF)	Ruairí Ó Brádaigh (SF)	Michael Kennedy (FF)	Seán Mac Eoin (FG)	Charles Fagan (FG)
17th	1961	Frank Carter (FF)	Joe Sheridan (Ind.)	Michael Kennedy (FF)	Seán Mac Eoin (FG)	4 seats 1961–1992
18th	1965	Frank Carter (FF)	Joe Sheridan (Ind.)	Patrick Lenihan (FF)	Gerry L'Estrange (FG)	4 seats 1961–1992
19th	1969	Frank Carter (FF)	Joe Sheridan (Ind.)	Patrick Lenihan (FF)	Gerry L'Estrange (FG)	4 seats 1961–1992
19th	1970 by-election	Frank Carter (FF)	Joe Sheridan (Ind.)	Patrick Cooney (FG)	Gerry L'Estrange (FG)	4 seats 1961–1992
20th	1973	Frank Carter (FF)	Joe Sheridan (Ind.)	Patrick Cooney (FG)	Gerry L'Estrange (FG)	4 seats 1961–1992
21st	1977	Albert Reynolds (FF)	Joe Sheridan (Ind.)	Seán Keegan (FF)	Gerry L'Estrange (FG)	4 seats 1961–1992
22nd	1981	Albert Reynolds (FF)	Patrick Cooney (FG)	Seán Keegan (FF)	Gerry L'Estrange (FG)	4 seats 1961–1992
23rd	1982 (Feb)	Albert Reynolds (FF)	Patrick Cooney (FG)	Seán Keegan (FF)	Gerry L'Estrange (FG)	4 seats 1961–1992
24th	1982 (Nov)	Albert Reynolds (FF)	Patrick Cooney (FG)	Mary O'Rourke (FF)	Gerry L'Estrange (FG)	4 seats 1961–1992
25th	1987	Albert Reynolds (FF)	Patrick Cooney (FG)	Mary O'Rourke (FF)	Henry Abbott (FF)	4 seats 1961–1992
26th	1989	Albert Reynolds (FF)	Louis Belton (FG)	Mary O'Rourke (FF)	Paul McGrath (FG)	4 seats 1961–1992
27th	1992	Constituency abolished. See Longford–Roscommon and Westmeath				

Note: The columns in this table are used only for presentational purposes, and no significance should be attached to the order of columns. For details of the order in which seats were won at each election, see the detailed results of that election.

=== TDs since 2007 ===
Teachtaí Dála (TDs) for Longford–Westmeath 2007–
Key to parties: FF = Fianna Fáil; FG = Fine Gael; Ind. = Independent; Lab = Labour; SF = Sinn Féin
Dáil	Election	Deputy (Party)	Deputy (Party)	Deputy (Party)	Deputy (Party)	Deputy (Party)
30th	2007	Willie Penrose (Lab)	Peter Kelly (FF)	Mary O'Rourke (FF)	James Bannon (FG)	4 seats 2007–2024
31st	2011	Willie Penrose (Lab)	Robert Troy (FF)	Nicky McFadden (FG)	James Bannon (FG)	4 seats 2007–2024
31st	2014 by-election	Willie Penrose (Lab)	Robert Troy (FF)	Gabrielle McFadden (FG)	James Bannon (FG)	4 seats 2007–2024
32nd	2016	Willie Penrose (Lab)	Robert Troy (FF)	Kevin "Boxer" Moran (Ind.)	Peter Burke (FG)	4 seats 2007–2024
33rd	2020	Sorca Clarke (SF)	Robert Troy (FF)	Joe Flaherty (FF)	Peter Burke (FG)	4 seats 2007–2024
34th	2024	Sorca Clarke (SF)	Robert Troy (FF)	Kevin "Boxer" Moran (Ind.)	Peter Burke (FG)	Micheál Carrigy (FG)

Note: The columns in this table are used only for presentational purposes, and no significance should be attached to the order of columns. For details of the order in which seats were won at each election, see the detailed results of that election.

== Elections ==
*: Outgoing TD

=== 2024 general election ===
2024 general election: Longford–Westmeath
Party	Candidate	FPv%	Count														
Party	Candidate	FPv%	1	2	3	4	5	6	7	8	9	10	11	12	13	14	15
Fine Gael	Peter Burke	17.6	10,864														
Fianna Fáil	Robert Troy	13.1	8,116	8,316	8,334	8,371	8,481	8,524	8,549	8,583	8,653	9,067	9,360	9,438	9,490	9,527	10,331
Independent	Kevin "Boxer" Moran	13.0	8,056	8,089	8,112	8,138	8,237	8,358	8,456	8,514	8,812	9,069	9,539	10,164	10,255	10,450	
Fine Gael	Micheál Carrigy	11.5	7,090	7,197	7,202	7,238	7,251	7,597	7,604	7,630	7,679	7,945	8,062	8,680	8,838	8,917	9,208
Sinn Féin	Sorca Clarke	11.3	6,998	7,016	7,026	7,059	7,072	7,083	7,126	7,397	7,572	7,993	8,315	8,525	10,878		
Fianna Fáil	Joe Flaherty	8.4	5,231	5,239	5,244	5,256	5,429	5,443	5,458	5,490	5,507	5,605	5,693	6,212	6,301	6,374	6,563
Independent Ireland	Paul Hogan	4.8	2,956	2,970	2,988	2,993	3,030	3,051	3,290	3,336	3,428	3,537	4,033	4,216	4,305	4,484	
Sinn Féin	Barry Campion	3.8	2,344	2,347	2,357	2,364	2,370	2,374	2,384	2,489	2,527	2,667	2,783	2,987			
Independent	Gerry Warnock	3.7	2,262	2,264	2,281	2,288	2,288	2,294	2,347	2,389	2,432	2,502	2,700				
Aontú	Laura O'Neill	3.1	1,926	1,936	1,971	1,993	1,999	2,006	2,248	2,299	2,362	2,472					
Labour	Fidelma Bennett	2.5	1,574	1,606	1,619	1,766	1,777	1,800	1,813	1,993	2,300						
PBP–Solidarity	Dave Smyth (Note: Smyth is a member of People Before Profit.)	1.5	960	963	968	1,009	1,012	1,016	1,047								
Independent	Louise Heavin	1.5	915	920	952	1,011	1,031	1,059	1,100	1,250							
Ireland First	Margaret Alacoque Maguire	1.4	864	866	878	883	883	884									
Fianna Fáil	Dympna Cunniffe	0.8	528	533	535	546											
Fine Gael	Tanya Cannon	0.8	507	608	612	626	658										
Green	Carol Okeke	0.8	464	468	474												
Independent	Paul Bradley	0.2	115	116													
Independent	Charlotte Keenan	0.1	66	67													
Independent	Donal Jackson	0.1	48	48													
Electorate: 106,814 Valid: 61,884 Spoilt: 469 Quota: 10,315 Turnout: 58.4%

=== 2020 general election ===
2020 general election: Longford–Westmeath
Party	Candidate	FPv%	Count									
Party	Candidate	FPv%	1	2	3	4	5	6	7	8	9	10
Sinn Féin	Sorca Clarke	21.0	11,848									
Fianna Fáil	Robert Troy	16.6	9,331	9,384	9,399	9,410	9,445	9,476	9,578	9,661	10,620	10,793
Fianna Fáil	Joe Flaherty	13.6	7,666	7,703	7,755	7,761	7,788	7,825	7,976	7,999	8,236	11,064
Independent	Kevin "Boxer" Moran	11.9	6,730	6,827	6,866	6,896	6,978	7,097	7,363	7,746	9,229	10,003
Fine Gael	Peter Burke	11.7	6,617	6,635	6,645	6,648	6,662	6,677	6,731	7,306	8,325	11,034
Fine Gael	Micheál Carrigy	11.2	6,334	6,350	6,398	6,399	6,421	6,451	6,534	6,707	6,981	
Green	Louise Heavin	4.1	2,325	2,397	2,410	2,441	2,488	2,721	2,780	2,910		
Labour	Alan Mangan	3.4	1,904	1,949	1,957	1,964	1,990	2,036	2,079	2,119		
Fine Gael	Gabrielle McFadden	2.5	1,411	1,416	1,422	1,425	1,432	1,439	1,450			
National Party	James Reynolds	1.7	983	1,001	1,020	1,030	1,081	1,130				
Solidarity–PBP	Barbara Smyth (Note: Smyth was a member of People Before Profit.)	0.7	411	478	483	675	725					
Independent	Anna Kavanagh	0.6	334	363	397	408						
Solidarity–PBP	Dom Parker (Note: Parker was a member of Solidarity.)	0.4	221	314	322							
Independent	Frank Kilbride	0.4	197	206								
Independent	Donal Jackson	0.1	71	83								
Electorate: 94,835 Valid: 56,383 Spoilt: 500 Quota: 11,277 Turnout: 56,883 (60.0%)

=== 2016 general election ===
Final result following a recount.

2016 general election: Longford–Westmeath
Party	Candidate	FPv%	Count														
Party	Candidate	FPv%	1	2	3	4	5	6	7	8	9	10	11	12	13	14	15
Fianna Fáil	Robert Troy	21.1	11,655														
Independent	Kevin "Boxer" Moran	13.7	7,585	7,658	7,672	7,714	7,733	7,838	7,960	8,134	8,341	8,486	9,244	10,108	11,120		
Fine Gael	Peter Burke	10.3	5,683	5,751	5,757	5,774	5,779	5,787	5,900	6,074	6,246	6,291	7,451	7,633	7,877	7,890	11,385
Sinn Féin	Paul Hogan	9.5	5,276	5,311	5,346	5,375	5,407	5,607	5,633	5,784	5,909	6,039	6,110	6,643	7,370	7,386	7,824
Labour	Willie Penrose	8.7	4,822	4,940	4,947	4,980	4,986	5,015	5,039	5,185	5,503	5,642	6,041	6,360	7,058	7,087	8,505
Fine Gael	James Bannon	8.4	4,649	4,659	4,663	4,665	4,669	4,672	4,703	4,711	4,775	4,985	5,436	5,955	7,077	7,081	
Fianna Fáil	Connie Gerety-Quinn	7.1	3,944	4,163	4,167	4,176	4,186	4,195	4,266	4,297	4,370	4,703	4,764	5,917			
Independent	James Morgan	6.0	3,329	3,344	3,356	3,367	3,423	3,443	3,492	3,531	3,657	4,315	4,339				
Fine Gael	Gabrielle McFadden	5.1	2,834	2,842	2,846	2,856	2,867	2,872	2,905	2,915	2,991	3,025					
Independent	Mae Sexton	3.0	1,646	1,654	1,657	1,662	1,729	1,755	1,781	1,822	1,895						
Green	Manchán Magan	2.0	1,104	1,111	1,122	1,134	1,157	1,235	1,261	1,395							
Independent	Brian Fagan	1.6	898	921	935	952	965	1,023	1,053								
Catholic Democrats	Noel McKervey	1.2	654	658	664	672	676	686									
AAA–PBP	Dominic Parker	0.9	506	510	532	549	591										
Independent	Barbara Smyth	0.5	296	299	308	312											
Independent	James Miller	0.4	210	213	232												
Direct Democracy	Stephanie Healy	0.2	132	133													
Independent	Donal Jackson	0.1	53	53													
Electorate: 84,219 Valid: 55,276 Spoilt: 540 Quota: 11,056 Turnout: 66.3%

=== 2014 by-election ===
Fine Gael TD Nicky McFadden died on 25 March 2014. A by-election was held to fill the vacancy on 23 May 2014, the same date as the 2014 European and local elections, and a by-election in Dublin West. The seat was won by Gabrielle McFadden, sister of the deceased TD.

2014 by-election: Longford–Westmeath
Party	Candidate	FPv%	Count						
Party	Candidate	FPv%	1	2	3	4	5	6	7
Fine Gael	Gabrielle McFadden	25.2	12,365	12,459	13,414	14,390	15,841	17,564	20,058
Fianna Fáil	Aengus O'Rourke	18.2	8,910	8,966	9,289	9,763	10,811	12,431	14,581
Sinn Féin	Paul Hogan	15.4	7,548	7,677	8,014	8,756	9,570	11,254	
Independent	James Morgan	12.2	5,959	6,096	6,206	6,615			
Independent	Kevin "Boxer" Moran	11.5	5,629	5,849	6,085	6,833	7,797		
Independent	Brian Fagan	8.6	4,195	4,378	4,985				
Labour	Denis Leonard	6.7	3,290	3,352					
Independent	John McNamara	1.8	869						
Independent	Donal Jackson	0.5	238						
Electorate: 87,999 Valid: 49,003 Spoilt: 1,492 (3.0%) Quota: 24,502 Turnout: 50,495 (57.4%)

=== 2011 general election ===
2011 general election: Longford–Westmeath
Party	Candidate	FPv%	Count							
Party	Candidate	FPv%	1	2	3	4	5	6	7	8
Labour	Willie Penrose	19.8	11,406	11,560						
Fine Gael	James Bannon	15.9	9,129	9,178	9,292	10,888	11,017	12,440		
Fine Gael	Peter Burke	11.5	6,629	6,717	6,807	6,976	7,147	7,207	7,317	8,097
Fine Gael	Nicky McFadden	10.7	6,129	6,240	6,626	6,989	8,906	9,071	9,245	10,664
Sinn Féin	Paul Hogan	7.5	4,339	4,464	4,647	5,166	6,063	6,340	6,487	
Fianna Fáil	Robert Troy	7.4	4,275	4,323	5,453	5,624	5,953	8,490	8,757	9,401
Labour	Mae Sexton	6.9	3,960	4,046	4,175					
Fianna Fáil	Peter Kelly	6.7	3,876	3,904	4,385	4,976	5,161			
Independent	Kevin "Boxer" Moran	6.4	3,707	3,899	4,333	4,559				
Fianna Fáil	Mary O'Rourke	5.3	3,046	3,101						
Independent	John Boland	0.6	330							
Green	Siobhán Kinahan	0.5	309							
New Vision	David D'arcy (Note: New Vision was an electoral alliance of independent non-party candidates and did not appear on the ballot.)	0.3	159							
Independent	Benny Cooney	0.2	130							
Independent	Donal Jackson	0.2	101							
Electorate: 83,970 Valid: 57,525 Spoilt: 661 (1.1%) Quota: 11,506 Turnout: 58,186 (69.3%)

=== 2007 general election ===
2007 general election: Longford–Westmeath
Party	Candidate	FPv%	Count						
Party	Candidate	FPv%	1	2	3	4	5	6	7
Labour	Willie Penrose	17.6	9,692	10,055	10,523	10,716	12,276		
Fianna Fáil	Mary O'Rourke	14.9	8,215	8,311	8,646	8,872	8,965	9,083	12,677
Fianna Fáil	Peter Kelly	14.1	7,720	7,765	7,992	8,967	9,006	9,026	11,032
Fine Gael	James Bannon	13.9	7,652	7,723	7,943	8,611	9,467	9,845	10,158
Fianna Fáil	Donie Cassidy	12.1	6,664	6,740	6,958	7,060	7,330	7,555	
Fine Gael	Nicky McFadden	9.8	5,359	5,476	5,798	5,894	7,253	7,742	8,276
Fine Gael	Peter Burke	7.3	3,988	4,140	4,245	4,287			
Progressive Democrats	Mae Sexton	4.2	2,298	2,350	2,420				
Sinn Féin	Paul Hogan	3.9	2,136	2,280					
Green	Betty Doran	1.7	960						
Christian Solidarity	Colm Callanan	0.2	124						
Independent	Noel O'Gara	0.2	84						
Independent	Séamus Cunningham	0.1	24						
Electorate: 83,980 Valid: 54,916 Spoilt: 557 (1.0%) Quota: 10,984 Turnout: 55,473 (66.1%)

=== 1989 general election ===
1989 general election: Longford–Westmeath
Party	Candidate	FPv%	Count					
Party	Candidate	FPv%	1	2	3	4	5	6
Fianna Fáil	Albert Reynolds	21.4	9,055					
Fianna Fáil	Mary O'Rourke	16.9	7,154	7,474	7,536	7,988	8,729	
Fianna Fáil	Henry Abbott	15.9	6,733	6,891	6,985	7,391	7,402	7,508
Fine Gael	Louis Belton	15.4	6,515	6,602	6,721	7,153	8,604	
Fine Gael	Paul McGrath	11.1	4,690	4,696	4,964	5,533	7,602	7,765
Fine Gael	Brendan McFadden	9.6	4,047	4,051	4,172	4,771		
Independent	June Kiernan	7.6	3,207	3,220	3,376			
Progressive Democrats	Patrick Whelan	1.7	733	738				
Independent	Hugh O'Brien	0.4	161	163				
Electorate: 60,784 Valid: 42,295 Spoilt: 488 Quota: 8,460 Turnout: 42,783 (70.0%)

=== 1987 general election ===
1987 general election: Longford–Westmeath
Party	Candidate	FPv%	Count						
Party	Candidate	FPv%	1	2	3	4	5	6	7
Fianna Fáil	Albert Reynolds	23.4	10,542						
Fianna Fáil	Henry Abbott	17.8	8,035	8,498	8,534	8,805	8,879	9,903	
Fianna Fáil	Mary O'Rourke	16.5	7,440	8,219	8,283	8,384	8,698	8,753	8,952
Fine Gael	Patrick Cooney	12.6	5,680	5,731	5,750	5,852	6,282	7,983	11,743
Fine Gael	Séamus Finnan	8.1	3,642	3,751	3,827	3,902	3,992	4,954	
Progressive Democrats	Helena McAuliffe-Ennis	7.7	3,463	3,494	3,518	3,700	4,699	5,089	5,702
Fine Gael	Colm Smyth	6.9	3,094	3,101	3,105	3,231	3,312		
Progressive Democrats	Daniel O'Sullivan	4.3	1,938	1,967	1,993	2,062			
Labour	Séamus McNamee	2.3	1,038	1,046	1,078				
Independent	Peter Murphy	0.6	280	314					
Electorate: 61,253 Valid: 45,152 Quota: 9,031 Turnout: 73.7%

=== November 1982 general election ===
November 1982 general election: Longford–Westmeath
Party	Candidate	FPv%	Count					
Party	Candidate	FPv%	1	2	3	4	5	6
Fianna Fáil	Albert Reynolds	20.5	8,999					
Fine Gael	Patrick Cooney	18.2	7,902	8,377	9,948			
Fine Gael	Gerry L'Estrange	17.1	7,421	7,989	9,635			
Fianna Fáil	Seán Keegan	16.3	7,058	7,243	7,370	7,451	7,671	7,891
Fianna Fáil	Mary O'Rourke	16.2	7,040	7,158	7,321	7,456	7,748	8,066
Fine Gael	Séamus Finnan	8.0	3,455	3,636				
Labour	Robert Brady	3.8	1,636					
Electorate: 57,780 Valid: 43,411 Quota: 8,683 Turnout: 75.1%

=== February 1982 general election ===
February 1982 general election: Longford–Westmeath
Party	Candidate	FPv%	Count					
Party	Candidate	FPv%	1	2	3	4	5	6
Fianna Fáil	Albert Reynolds	23.7	10,214					
Fine Gael	Patrick Cooney	19.1	8,249	8,304	8,563	9,365		
Fine Gael	Gerry L'Estrange	17.3	7,450	7,503	7,905	8,766		
Fianna Fáil	Seán Keegan	15.4	6,648	7,197	7,267	7,319	7,393	8,097
Fianna Fáil	Mary O'Rourke	13.2	5,688	6,439	6,459	6,535	6,631	7,493
Sinn Féin	Seán Lynch	4.9	2,121	2,231	2,308	2,431	2,613	
Fine Gael	Gus Hanley	4.2	1,797	1,859	1,960			
Labour	Robert Brady	2.2	957	966				
Electorate: 56,787 Valid: 43,124 Quota: 8,625 Turnout: 75.9%

=== 1981 general election ===
1981 general election: Longford–Westmeath
Party	Candidate	FPv%	Count							
Party	Candidate	FPv%	1	2	3	4	5	6	7	8
Fianna Fáil	Albert Reynolds	23.0	10,450							
Fine Gael	Patrick Cooney	18.2	8,244	8,388	8,444	9,575				
Fine Gael	Gerry L'Estrange	12.1	5,499	5,515	5,563	6,594	7,033	8,426	9,986	
Fianna Fáil	Seán Keegan	12.1	5,476	5,486	6,058	6,133	6,140	6,760	8,141	8,403
Fianna Fáil	Seán Fallon	11.7	5,285	5,331	5,728	5,818	5,835	6,161	7,431	7,720
Anti H-Block	Martin Hurson	10.1	4,573	4,596	4,747	5,088	5,118	5,520		
Labour	James Bennett	6.2	2,826	2,964	2,978	3,018	3,026			
Fine Gael	Gus Hanley	5.8	2,619	2,630	2,768					
Labour	Neil O'Shea	0.9	393							
Electorate: 56,787 Valid: 45,365 Quota: 9,074 Turnout: 79.9%

=== 1977 general election ===
1977 general election: Longford–Westmeath
Party	Candidate	FPv%	Count						
Party	Candidate	FPv%	1	2	3	4	5	6	7
Independent	Joe Sheridan	16.2	7,461	7,601	8,023	8,283	8,601	8,694	8,913
Fianna Fáil	Albert Reynolds	15.4	7,064	7,187	7,219	7,536	8,802	10,491	
Fine Gael	Gerry L'Estrange	15.0	6,873	7,349	8,457	8,652	8,769	8,798	8,816
Fine Gael	Patrick Cooney	14.3	6,590	7,002	7,507	7,663	8,397	8,450	8,524
Fianna Fáil	Seán Keegan	11.9	5,493	5,502	5,760	7,236	11,015		
Fianna Fáil	Seán Fallon	11.3	5,189	5,201	5,289	6,392			
Fianna Fáil	Henry Abbott	7.3	3,366	3,382	3,576				
Labour	James Bennett	5.9	2,687	2,716					
Fine Gael	Philomena Kelly	2.7	1,227						
Electorate: 56,421 Valid: 45,950 Spoilt: 262 (0.6%) Quota: 9,191 Turnout: 46,212 (81.9%)

=== 1973 general election ===
1973 general election: Longford–Westmeath
Party	Candidate	FPv%	Count					
Party	Candidate	FPv%	1	2	3	4	5	6
Fine Gael	Patrick Cooney	19.2	6,973	7,664				
Independent	Joe Sheridan	18.8	6,841	7,054	7,087	7,574		
Fianna Fáil	Frank Carter	16.2	5,882	5,989	5,995	6,078	7,156	7,182
Fianna Fáil	Seán Keegan	13.2	4,792	4,822	4,823	4,916	6,924	6,995
Fine Gael	Gerry L'Estrange	13.1	4,759	5,360	5,682	6,911	7,028	7,220
Fianna Fáil	Seán Fallon	9.1	3,304	3,323	3,324	3,418		
Labour	Jack Coleman	5.8	2,127	2,169	2,188			
Fine Gael	Thomas Kilbride	4.8	1,729					
Electorate: 47,095 Valid: 36,407 Quota: 7,282 Turnout: 77.3%

=== 1970 by-election ===
Fianna Fáil TD Patrick Lenihan died on 11 March 1970. A by-election was held to fill the vacancy on 14 April 1970.

1970 by-election: Longford–Westmeath
Party	Candidate	FPv%	Count	
Party	Candidate	FPv%	1	2
Fine Gael	Patrick Cooney	46.7	16,146	18,252
Fianna Fáil	Seán Keegan	44.1	15,228	15,904
Labour	Jack Coleman	9.2	3,180	
Electorate: 45,956 Valid: 34,554 Quota: 17,278 Turnout: 75.2%

=== 1969 general election ===
1969 general election: Longford–Westmeath
Party	Candidate	FPv%	Count						
Party	Candidate	FPv%	1	2	3	4	5	6	7
Independent	Joe Sheridan	19.5	7,133	7,166	7,316	7,472			
Fianna Fáil	Frank Carter	14.9	5,455	5,505	5,627	5,703	6,295	6,480	6,849
Fine Gael	Gerry L'Estrange	13.5	4,935	4,937	5,073	5,194	5,353	6,059	7,549
Fianna Fáil	Patrick Lenihan	12.3	4,499	4,509	4,545	4,555	6,369	6,647	6,774
Fine Gael	Patrick Cooney	10.5	3,844	3,873	3,940	4,203	4,234	4,517	5,648
Fianna Fáil	James O'Brien	7.6	2,767	2,773	2,833	2,838			
Fine Gael	Thomas Kilbride	7.2	2,615	2,640	2,655	3,495	3,513	3,580	
Labour	Timothy McAuliffe	5.7	2,084	2,191	2,998	3,018	3,138		
Fine Gael	Séamus Finnan	4.0	1,479	1,514	1,526				
Labour	James Bennett	3.7	1,360	1,468					
Labour	Michael Brady	1.1	420						
Electorate: 45,956 Valid: 36,591 Quota: 7,319 Turnout: 79.6%

=== 1965 general election ===
1965 general election: Longford–Westmeath
Party	Candidate	FPv%	Count							
Party	Candidate	FPv%	1	2	3	4	5	6	7	8
Fianna Fáil	Frank Carter	18.6	6,443	6,673	6,906	7,835				
Independent	Joe Sheridan	16.0	5,566	5,627	6,260	6,640	6,718	6,986		
Fine Gael	Seán Mac Eoin	14.1	4,898	4,906	5,304	5,333	5,339	6,456	6,561	6,595
Fine Gael	Gerry L'Estrange	12.1	4,193	4,248	4,794	4,921	4,941	7,048		
Fine Gael	Patrick Cooney	10.6	3,665	3,682	4,030	4,067	4,080			
Fianna Fáil	Patrick Lenihan	9.0	3,126	3,406	3,591	5,483	6,177	6,595	6,597	6,608
Labour	Timothy McAuliffe	8.2	2,833	2,869						
Fianna Fáil	Seán Keegan	7.5	2,589	3,285	3,507					
Fianna Fáil	Daniel Leavy	4.0	1,391							
Electorate: 44,722 Valid: 34,704 Quota: 6,941 Turnout: 77.6%

=== 1961 general election ===
1961 general election: Longford–Westmeath
Party	Candidate	FPv%	Count						
Party	Candidate	FPv%	1	2	3	4	5	6	7
Fianna Fáil	Frank Carter	17.3	5,891	5,975	6,023	6,592	7,656		
Fine Gael	Seán Mac Eoin	16.7	5,719	5,912	6,707	7,217			
Fianna Fáil	Michael Kennedy	14.1	4,822	4,950	5,022	5,225	6,363	6,393	7,113
Independent	Joe Sheridan	13.4	4,561	4,752	4,919	5,552	5,905	6,099	6,164
Fine Gael	Gerry L'Estrange	11.3	3,862	4,032	5,315	5,525	5,728	5,803	5,844
Sinn Féin	Ruairí Ó Brádaigh	7.6	2,598	2,800	2,882				
Fianna Fáil	Patrick Lenihan	7.6	2,593	2,826	3,121	3,268			
Fine Gael	Patrick Cooney	7.4	2,540	2,800					
Labour	Thomas Darcy	4.6	1,563						
Electorate: 44,439 Valid: 34,149 Quota: 6,830 Turnout: 76.8%

=== 1957 general election ===
1957 general election: Longford–Westmeath
Party	Candidate	FPv%	Count						
Party	Candidate	FPv%	1	2	3	4	5	6	7
Fine Gael	Seán Mac Eoin	15.4	6,031	6,110	6,318	6,695			
Sinn Féin	Ruairí Ó Brádaigh	14.1	5,506	5,562	5,871	6,060	6,252	6,506	6,851
Fianna Fáil	Michael Kennedy	14.0	5,482	5,498	5,535	5,546	6,125	6,226	6,300
Fianna Fáil	Erskine H. Childers	13.2	5,141	5,213	5,312	5,411	6,383	6,468	6,529
Fianna Fáil	Frank Carter	12.8	4,985	5,000	5,096	5,146	5,529	5,590	5,656
Fine Gael	Charles Fagan	9.2	3,598	3,634	3,737	4,130	4,222	7,054	
Fine Gael	Joe Sheridan	7.4	2,878	2,910	3,020	3,468	3,557		
Fianna Fáil	James McAuley	5.5	2,155	2,202	2,365	2,457			
Fine Gael	George Allen	3.6	1,394	1,473	1,700				
Labour	Joseph Brennan	3.4	1,326	1,423					
Independent	Henry Rice	1.4	549						
Electorate: 51,757 Valid: 39,045 Quota: 6,508 Turnout: 75.4%

=== 1954 general election ===
1954 general election: Longford–Westmeath
Party	Candidate	FPv%	Count					
Party	Candidate	FPv%	1	2	3	4	5	6
Fine Gael	Seán Mac Eoin	15.8	6,693	6,929	7,349			
Fianna Fáil	Frank Carter	14.0	5,941	6,027	6,039	6,098	6,222	7,120
Fine Gael	Charles Fagan	13.7	5,800	5,826	5,971	6,273	7,151	
Fianna Fáil	Michael Kennedy	12.5	5,284	5,300	5,329	5,384	5,558	6,539
Fianna Fáil	Erskine H. Childers	10.8	4,573	4,612	4,621	4,673	4,825	6,585
Fine Gael	Joe Sheridan	9.9	4,188	4,260	4,633	5,035	5,749	5,990
Fianna Fáil	Brian Lenihan Snr	8.7	3,666	3,680	3,739	3,915	4,411	
Labour	Thomas Darcy	5.1	2,172	2,723	2,797	3,514		
Clann na Poblachta	Alfred Faulkner	4.0	1,695	1,771	1,856			
Fine Gael	Michael Heavey	2.9	1,216	1,218				
Labour	Hubert Wilson	2.7	1,144					
Electorate: 52,876 Valid: 42,372 Quota: 7,063 Turnout: 80.1%

=== 1951 general election ===
1951 general election: Longford–Westmeath
Party	Candidate	FPv%	Count									
Party	Candidate	FPv%	1	2	3	4	5	6	7	8	9	10
Fine Gael	Seán Mac Eoin	19.0	7,860									
Fianna Fáil	Frank Carter	16.7	6,924									
Fianna Fáil	Michael Kennedy	14.6	6,068	6,086	6,087	6,117	6,162	6,223	6,347	6,377	6,970	
Independent	Charles Fagan	14.5	6,009	6,126	6,126	6,200	6,365	6,615	7,266			
Fianna Fáil	Erskine H. Childers	8.9	3,702	3,763	3,777	3,799	3,933	4,061	4,126	4,143	5,270	5,902
Fine Gael	Joe Sheridan	6.2	2,582	3,168	3,168	3,203	3,539	3,683	4,066	4,287	4,330	5,416
Fianna Fáil	Patrick Hogan	4.4	1,819	1,827	1,828	1,854	1,900	2,139	2,181	2,190		
Labour	Thomas Darcy	4.3	1,769	1,792	1,792	1,812	1,979	2,716	3,133	3,214	3,489	
Independent	Frank Waters	3.9	1,608	1,630	1,630	1,661	1,697					
Clann na Poblachta	Gerard Jennings	3.3	1,375	1,382	1,382	1,521	1,869	1,915				
Clann na Poblachta	Patrick Farrell	3.2	1,317	1,421	1,421	1,456						
Clann na Poblachta	Thomas Kavanagh	1.0	414	420	420							
Electorate: 53,822 Valid: 41,447 Quota: 6,908 Turnout: 77.0%

=== 1948 general election ===
1948 general election: Longford–Westmeath
Party	Candidate	FPv%	Count											
Party	Candidate	FPv%	1	2	3	4	5	6	7	8	9	10	11	12
Independent	Charles Fagan	15.2	6,319	6,442	6,474	6,789	6,797	6,862	6,869	7,078				
Fianna Fáil	Thomas Carter	14.2	5,907	5,920	5,939	5,943	6,106	6,160	6,161	6,383	6,399	6,927	7,064	
Fine Gael	Seán Mac Eoin	13.2	5,483	5,575	5,598	6,027	6,265	6,963						
Fianna Fáil	Erskine H. Childers	12.8	5,325	5,336	5,346	5,358	5,614	5,706	5,708	5,938	5,963	6,752	6,959	
Fianna Fáil	Michael Kennedy	12.4	5,158	5,173	5,199	5,224	5,236	5,251	5,252	5,276	5,280	5,781	6,016	6,149
Clann na Poblachta	Conor Byrne	5.8	2,403	2,413	2,797	2,815	2,832	2,907	2,910	2,967	2,977	3,021	3,564	5,077
Fianna Fáil	James McAuley	4.7	1,956	1,963	1,972	1,979	1,991	2,092	2,093	2,134	2,137			
Labour	John J. Hoey	4.4	1,851	1,871	1,887	1,907	2,116	2,193	2,196	2,217	2,218	2,264		
Clann na Poblachta	Patrick Farrell	4.0	1,648	1,652	1,860	1,864	1,913	1,988	1,991	2,327	2,362	2,394	2,594	
Clann na Talmhan	Thomas McManus	3.1	1,277	1,280	1,286	1,289	1,353	1,382	1,382					
Fine Gael	Frank Waters	2.7	1,137	1,206	1,217	1,342	1,346							
Labour	Seán F. Lynch	2.5	1,041	1,045	1,050	1,060								
Fine Gael	Gerry L'Estrange	2.1	859	978	984									
Clann na Poblachta	James J. Killean	1.8	766	778										
Fine Gael	William Finnerty	1.3	520											
Electorate: 54,709 Valid: 41,650 Quota: 6,942 Turnout: 76.1%

=== 1933 general election ===
1933 general election: Longford–Westmeath
Party	Candidate	FPv%	Count						
Party	Candidate	FPv%	1	2	3	4	5	6	7
Fianna Fáil	Michael Kennedy	17.5	7,784						
Cumann na nGaedheal	Seán Mac Eoin	13.9	6,171	6,175	6,991	7,650			
Fianna Fáil	James Victory	13.3	5,935	5,985	6,006	6,145	6,183	6,204	7,038
National Centre Party	Charles Fagan	12.9	5,729	5,734	5,829	8,301			
Fianna Fáil	Francis Gormley	11.3	5,020	5,049	5,061	5,112	5,194	5,220	5,595
Fianna Fáil	James Geoghegan	10.4	4,649	4,890	4,952	5,031	5,164	5,179	7,866
Labour	Henry Broderick	10.0	4,457	4,481	4,579	4,816	4,941	5,008	
National Centre Party	Robert Belton	8.2	3,654	3,655	3,683				
Cumann na nGaedheal	John Grenham	2.6	1,152	1,156					
Electorate: 55,004 Valid: 44,551 Quota: 7,426 Turnout: 81.0%

=== 1932 general election ===
1932 general election: Longford–Westmeath
Party	Candidate	FPv%	Count						
Party	Candidate	FPv%	1	2	3	4	5	6	7
Fianna Fáil	James Geoghegan	17.5	7,202						
Fianna Fáil	Michael Kennedy	15.8	6,484	6,631	6,712	6,723	6,728	7,712	
Cumann na nGaedheal	Seán Mac Eoin	15.2	6,249	6,257	8,439				
Cumann na nGaedheal	Patrick Shaw	14.9	6,128	6,143	6,677	8,084			
Fianna Fáil	James Victory	9.7	3,974	4,010	4,090	4,121	4,162	4,649	4,876
Fianna Fáil	Francis Gormley	9.2	3,796	3,930	4,222	4,242	4,256	5,120	5,365
Labour	Henry Broderick	9.2	3,765	3,776	3,901	3,940	4,151		
Cumann na nGaedheal	Patrick Connolly	8.4	3,463	3,470					
Electorate: 54,592 Valid: 41,061 Quota: 6,844 Turnout: 75.2%

=== 1930 by-election ===
Fianna Fáil TD James Killane died on 26 April 1930. A by-election was held to fill the vacancy on 13 June 1930.

1930 by-election: Longford–Westmeath
Party	Candidate	FPv%	Count
Party	Candidate	FPv%	1
Fianna Fáil	James Geoghegan	53.6	21,881
Cumann na nGaedheal	Vincent Delany	40.3	16,438
Labour	Michael Duffy	6.2	2,525
Electorate: 56,059 Valid: 40,844 Quota: 20,423 Turnout: 72.9%

=== September 1927 general election ===
September 1927 general election: Longford–Westmeath
Party	Candidate	FPv%	Count								
Party	Candidate	FPv%	1	2	3	4	5	6	7	8	9
Cumann na nGaedheal	Patrick Shaw	18.1	6,812								
Fianna Fáil	Michael Kennedy	11.3	4,247	4,268	4,333	4,431	4,459	6,695			
Cumann na nGaedheal	Michael Connolly	10.7	4,052	4,257	4,374	4,709	5,922	5,946	5,947	6,032	6,123
Labour	Henry Broderick	10.7	4,051	4,094	4,433	4,545	4,930	5,049	5,052	5,296	6,109
Farmers' Party	Hugh Garahan	10.2	3,841	3,879	3,925	4,494	4,740	4,892	4,895	5,031	5,195
Fianna Fáil	James Killane	9.1	3,434	3,439	3,485	3,670	3,686	4,038	4,369	7,735	
Fianna Fáil	James Victory	9.0	3,376	3,381	3,509	3,759	3,798	4,212	4,283		
Fianna Fáil	James Higgins	8.3	3,121	3,125	3,233	3,397	3,449				
Independent	Patrick McKenna	4.9	1,860	1,897	2,033						
Cumann na nGaedheal	Owen Dolan	4.4	1,658	1,788	2,050	2,180					
Independent	John Lyons	3.3	1,259	1,297							
Electorate: 56,079 Valid: 37,711 Quota: 6,286 Turnout: 67.3%

=== June 1927 general election ===
June 1927 general election: Longford–Westmeath
Party	Candidate	FPv%	Count									
Party	Candidate	FPv%	1	2	3	4	5	6	7	8	9	10
Cumann na nGaedheal	Patrick Shaw	16.1	6,094	6,170	6,313							
Labour	Henry Broderick	11.3	4,282	4,552	4,612	4,789	4,937	5,071	5,145	5,622	6,264	6,329
Independent	Robert Belton	7.8	2,952	2,976	2,989	3,058	3,085	3,141	3,273			
Farmers' Party	Hugh Garahan	6.9	2,623	2,640	3,048	3,137	3,170	3,263	4,238	4,754	5,668	5,790
Fianna Fáil	James Victory	6.8	2,557	2,598	2,609	2,659	2,984	3,350	3,487	3,881	4,008	6,527
Fianna Fáil	Michael Kennedy	6.6	2,504	2,619	2,658	2,685	3,158	4,262	4,337	4,452	4,663	5,262
Fianna Fáil	James Killane	6.5	2,470	2,510	2,524	2,552	2,806	3,246	3,377	3,833	3,984	
Cumann na nGaedheal	Michael Connolly	6.5	2,449	2,475	2,498	3,117	3,126	3,160	3,455	4,048	4,461	4,552
National League	Richard Cleary	6.3	2,396	2,485	2,611	2,703	2,771	2,866	3,392	3,639		
Fianna Fáil	James Higgins	5.5	2,090	2,130	2,197	2,215	2,537					
Farmers' Party	Patrick McKenna	5.3	1,997	2,020	2,350	2,501	2,567	2,673				
Sinn Féin	Conor Byrne	4.7	1,766	1,801	1,828	1,850						
Cumann na nGaedheal	Patrick McCrann	3.6	1,375	1,417	1,461							
Farmers' Party	William Finerty	3.5	1,305	1,331								
Clann Éireann	Patrick Brett	1.4	538									
Clann Éireann	Seán O'Hurley	1.0	385									
Electorate: 56,079 Valid: 37,783 Quota: 6,298 Turnout: 67.4%

=== 1923 general election ===
Michael Gallagher notes that newspapers at the time were not consistent with the exact figures of the first count so there may have been slight differences to the below. Full figures for the second to the ninth counts are unavailable. The order of eliminations was O'Farrell on 138 votes, Carrigy 735, Groarke 924, Philips 1,203, Gavin 1,244, Redmond 1,396, Victory 1,851, Wilson 2,689 and Garahan 2,793.

1923 general election: Longford–Westmeath
Party	Candidate	FPv%	Count									
Party	Candidate	FPv%	1	2	3	4	5	6	7	8	9	10
Republican	Conor Byrne	15.2	5,299	N/A	N/A	N/A	N/A	6,152				
Cumann na nGaedheal	Patrick Shaw	14.8	5,147	N/A	N/A	N/A	N/A	N/A	N/A	N/A	N/A	5,891
Independent	John Lyons	12.8	4,452	N/A	N/A	N/A	N/A	N/A	N/A	N/A	N/A	5,793
Cumann na nGaedheal	Francis McGuinness	9.9	3,454	N/A	N/A	N/A	N/A	N/A	N/A	N/A	N/A	5,249
Farmers' Party	Patrick McKenna	9.4	3,274	N/A	N/A	N/A	N/A	N/A	N/A	N/A	N/A	5,434
Republican	James Killane	7.9	2,757	N/A	N/A	N/A	N/A	N/A	N/A	N/A	N/A	5,569
Farmers' Party	Hugh Garahan	5.7	1,991									
Republican	James Victory	4.7	1,634									
Labour	Hubert Wilson	4.6	1,590									
Labour	Thomas Redmond	3.7	1,285									
Republican	John Gavin	3.3	1,150									
Farmers' Party	Francis Phillips	3.1	1,091									
Farmers' Party	Thomas Groarke	2.5	877									
Cumann na nGaedheal	James Carrigy	2.0	708									
National Democratic	Seán O'Farrell	0.4	136									
Electorate: 58,884 Valid: 34,845 Quota: 5,808 Turnout: 59.2%

=== 1922 general election ===
1922 general election: Longford–Westmeath
Party	Candidate	FPv%	Count			
Party	Candidate	FPv%	1	2	3	4
Sinn Féin (Pro-Treaty)	Seán Mac Eoin	35.3	10,152			
Labour	John Lyons	24.6	7,073			
Sinn Féin (Anti-Treaty)	Laurence Ginnell	17.4	5,022	5,604	6,073	
Sinn Féin (Pro-Treaty)	Francis McGuinness	7.9	2,280	5,173	5,728	5,873
Independent	Patrick Belton	7.8	2,258	2,515	2,590	2,617
Sinn Féin (Pro-Treaty)	Lorcan Robbins	6.9	1,996	2,659	2,876	2,970
Electorate: 47,078 Valid: 28,781 Quota: 5,757 Turnout: 61.1%

=== 1921 general election ===
1921 general election: Longford–Westmeath (uncontested)
Party	Candidate
Sinn Féin	Laurence Ginnell
Sinn Féin	Seán Mac Eoin
Sinn Féin	Joseph McGuinness
Sinn Féin	Lorcan Robbins
