= 2019 Longford County Council election =

Part of the 2019 Irish local elections

← 2014	24 May 2019	2024 →

All 18 seats on Longford County Council 10 seats needed for a majority
	First party	Second party	Third party
Party	Fine Gael	Fianna Fáil	Independent
Seats won	9	6	3
Seat change	▲1	▼1	Steady
- Results by Local Electoral Area

An election to all 18 seats on Longford County Council was held on 24 May 2019 as part of the 2019 Irish local elections. County Longford was divided into 3 local electoral areas (LEAs) to elect councillors for a five-year term of office on the electoral system of proportional representation by means of the single transferable vote (PR-STV).

The votes were counted in St. Mary's Community Centre, Edgeworthstown. Counting began on Saturday 25 May, and ended at 9.25 p.m. on Tuesday 28 May when returning officer Nora O'Farrell declared the last 4 councillors to be elected in the Ballymahon LEA, where there had been a recount.

== Boundary review ==
Following the recommendations of the 2018 LEA boundary review committee, there was a revision to the LEAs used at the 2014 elections, with an adjustment in boundaries and the transfer of one seat from Granard to Longford LEA.

== Results by party ==
Party	Seats	±	1st pref	FPv%	±%
Fine Gael	9	▲1	7,828	39.27	▼2.82
Fianna Fáil	6	▼1	6,471	32.47	▲0.57
Sinn Féin	0	Steady	912	4.58	▼1.97
People Before Profit	0	Steady	96	0.48	New
Independent	3	Steady	4,625	23.20	▲3.80
Total	18	Steady	19,932	100.00	

== Results by local electoral area ==
*: Outgoing councillor elected in 2014.
†: Outgoing councillor coopted subsequent to the 2014 election.

=== Ballymahon ===
Ballymahon: 6 seats
Party	Candidate	FPv%	Count							
Party	Candidate	FPv%	1	2	3	4	5	6	7	8
Fine Gael	Paul Ross	18.33%	1,217							
Independent	Mark Casey	14.99%	995							
Fianna Fáil	Mick Cahill	11.25%	747	807	825	830	855	873	938	1,024
Fianna Fáil	Pat O'Toole	10.08%	669	689	727	728	772	796	849	895
Fine Gael	Colm Murray	9.54%	633	705	713	718	740	750	859	927
Fine Gael	Gerard Farrell	9.37%	622	651	656	675	687	692	715	867
Fianna Fáil	Brigid Duffy	7.55%	501	554	556	558	562	580	593	640
Fianna Fáil	John Kenny	6.31%	419	427	431	438	442	448	499	
Independent	Tony Moran	4.90%	325	331	350	353	405	448		
Sinn Féin	Geraldine Ryan	2.95%	196	204	211	213	224			
Independent	Charlie McMonagle	2.73%	181	186	206	209				
Independent	P.J. Walsh	2.00%	133	138						
Electorate: 11,204 Valid: 6,638 Spoilt: 94 Quota: 949 Turnout: 6,732 (60.09%)

=== Granard ===
Granard: 5 seats
Party	Candidate	FPv%	Count								
Party	Candidate	FPv%	1	2	3	4	5	6	7	8	9
Independent	Turlough 'Pott' McGovern	19.41%	1,280								
Fine Gael	Micheál Carrigy (Note: See change below.)	17.94%	1,183								
Fine Gael	Paraic Brady	13.15%	867	881	899	943	1,025	1,053	1,235		
Fine Gael	Garry Murtagh	11.07%	730	747	764	803	876	912	942	980	1,123
Fianna Fáil	P.J. Reilly	9.83%	648	710	720	760	816	957	1,008	1,029	1,070
Fianna Fáil	Joe Murphy	5.92%	390	397	399	412	424	452	524	565	708
Sinn Féin	Mark Maguire	5.46%	360	370	373	387	420	456	486	514	
Fianna Fáil	Amanda Duffy	4.52%	298	304	306	372	386	421			
Independent	Grace Kearney	4.41%	291	331	338	359	383				
Fine Gael	Frank Kilbride	4.25%	280	297	307	334					
Fianna Fáil	Victor Connell	4.03%	266	274	289						
Electorate: 10,032 Valid: 6,593 Spoilt: 104 Quota: 1,099 Turnout: 6,697 (66.76%)

=== Longford ===
Longford: 7 seats
Party	Candidate	FPv%	Count								
Party	Candidate	FPv%	1	2	3	4	5	6	7	8	9
Fianna Fáil	Joe Flaherty	15.71%	1,053								
Fine Gael	Peggy Nolan	11.06%	741	763	765	776	779	796	808	841	
Fine Gael	Gerry Hagan	10.89%	730	748	749	753	755	788	824	833	842
Fine Gael	John Browne	10.33%	692	706	707	712	715	746	767	813	854
Independent	Gerry Warnock	9.83%	659	689	693	701	722	736	756	778	899
Fianna Fáil	Seamus Butler	9.79%	656	700	702	705	708	718	737	779	792
Fianna Fáil	Martin Monaghan	8.60%	576	609	613	627	634	645	695	736	781
Independent	Mae Sexton	7.07%	474	484	484	488	493	496	510	528	586
Sinn Féin	Tena Keown	5.31%	356	369	383	390	411	411	418	437	
Fianna Fáil	Uruemu Adejinmi	3.70%	248	265	268	269	279	284	292		
Independent	Seamus Gallagher	2.33%	156	161	163	174	184	201			
Fine Gael	Gerard Cooney	1.98%	133	137	138	147	149				
People Before Profit	Barbara Smyth	1.43%	96	97	99	106					
Independent	Tony Reilly	1.33%	89	91	92						
Independent	Julie O'Reilly	0.42%	28	29							
Independent	George Breaden	0.21%	14	15							
Electorate: 12,356 Valid: 6,701 Spoilt: 112 Quota: 838 Turnout: 6,813 (55.14%)

== Results by gender ==
2019 Longford County Council election Candidates by gender
Gender	Number of candidates	% of candidates	Elected councillors	% of councillors
Men	29	74.4%	17	94.4%
Women	10	25.6%	1	5.6%
TOTAL	39		18	

== Changes after 2019 ==
=== Co-options ===
Party	Outgoing	LEA	Reason	Date	Co-optee
Fianna Fáil	Joe Flaherty	Longford	Elected to the 33rd Dáil at the 2020 general election	25 February 2020	Uruemu Adejinmi
Fine Gael	Micheál Carrigy	Granard	Elected to the 26th Seanad at the 2020 Seanad election	16 May 2020	Colin Dalton

=== Changes in affiliation ===
Name	LEA	Elected as	New affiliation	Date
Gerard Farrell	Ballymahon	Fine Gael	Independent	March 2024
