= 2014 Longford County Council election =

Part of the 2014 Irish local elections

- 23 May 2014

All 18 seats on Longford County Council
	First party	Second party	Third party
Party	Fine Gael	Fianna Fáil	Independent
Seats won	8	7	3
Seat change	-2	-1	-
- Map showing the area of Longford County Council
Council control after election
Fine Gael
Independents

An election to all 18 seats on Longford County Council took place on 23 May 2014 as part of the 2014 Irish local elections, a reduction from 21 seats at the 2009 election. County Longford was divided into three local electoral areas (LEAs) to elect councillors for a five-year term of office on the electoral system of proportional representation by means of the single transferable vote (PR-STV). In addition, the town councils of Granard and Longford were abolished.

In one of the party's better local election results, Fine Gael remained the largest party with 8 seats. Fianna Fáil took 7 seats and the remainder were filled by Independents. This was the only Council on which Sinn Féin failed to make a breakthrough.

== Results by party ==
Party	Seats	±	1st pref	FPv%	±%
Fine Gael	8	-2	8,245	42.10	
Fianna Fáil	7	-1	6,264	31.90	
Sinn Féin	0	-	1,284	6.55	
Independent	3	-	3,803	19.40	
Total	18	-3	19,596	100.00	—

== Results by local electoral area ==
*: Outgoing councillor.

=== Ballymahon ===
Ballymahon: 6 seats
Party	Candidate	FPv%	Count						
Party	Candidate	FPv%	1	2	3	4	5	6	7
Fine Gael	Colm Murray	14.09	931	956					
Fine Gael	Gerard Farrell	12.79	845	848	848	856	863	1,066	
Independent	Mark Casey	12.50	826	885	886	1,036			
Fianna Fáil	Mick Cahill	11.44	756	785	786	831	848	899	921
Fianna Fáil	Thomas Victory	10.32	682	687	687	732	743	770	782
Fianna Fáil	Pat O'Toole	10.15	671	744	747	768	780	829	841
Fine Gael	Paul Ross	9.88	653	674	677	722	726	843	918
Fine Gael	Seán Farrell	7.23	478	496	498	517	519		
Sinn Féin	Edel Kelly	6.87	454	489	490				
Independent	Niamh Moran	4.72	312						
Electorate: 10,519 Valid: 6,608 (62.82%) Spoilt: 88 Quota: 945 Turnout: 6,696 (63.66%)

=== Granard ===
Granard: 6 seats
Party	Candidate	FPv%	Count							
Party	Candidate	FPv%	1	2	3	4	5	6	7	8
Fine Gael	Micheál Carrigy	15.26	1,111							
Fine Gael	John Duffy	10.47	762	768	789	828	853	942	1,079	
Fianna Fáil	P.J. Reilly	10.40	757	762	775	882	994	1,025	1,157	
Fine Gael	Paraic Brady	10.38	756	766	813	851	869	953	1,081	
Fianna Fáil	Martin Mulleady	8.71	634	637	691	698	753	832	889	905
Fianna Fáil	Luie McEntire	8.61	627	631	658	674	727	793	878	902
Sinn Féin	John Reilly	7.94	578	582	606	634	656	724	783	819
Independent	James Keogh	7.01	510	516	585	600	624			
Fine Gael	Frank Kilbride	6.85	499	513	520	590	651	721		
Fianna Fáil	John Coyle	5.32	387	395	406	428				
Fine Gael	Maura Kilbride-Harkin	4.73	344	350	361					
Independent	Mary Lillis	4.33	315	319						
Electorate: 11,015 Valid: 7,280 (66.09%) Spoilt: 83 Quota: 1,041 Turnout: 7,363 (66.85%)

=== Longford ===
Longford: 6 seats
Party	Candidate	FPv%	Count							
Party	Candidate	FPv%	1	2	3	4	5	6	7	8
Fine Gael	John Browne	12.74	727	734	755	779	831			
Fianna Fáil	Seamus Butler	12.25	699	712	731	747	774	856		
Fine Gael	Peggy Nolan	11.37	649	657	674	706	745	909		
Independent	Gerry Warnock	10.95	625	646	696	751	820			
Fianna Fáil	Michael Connellan	9.25	528	531	540	556	592	643	671	685
Fianna Fáil	Pádraig Loughrey	9.16	523	528	549	577	630	715	727	744
Independent	Mae Sexton	8.92	509	520	547	573	627	708	754	763
Fine Gael	Yvonne Ni Mhurchu	8.58	490	493	504	514	534			
Independent	Paul Connell	6.06	346	360	382	412				
Sinn Féin	Barbara Smyth	4.41	252	256	256					
Independent	Tony Flaherty	4.33	247	263	277	277				
Independent	Martin Clyne	1.98	113							
Electorate: 9,612 Valid: 5,708 (59.38%) Spoilt: 78 Quota: 816 Turnout: 5,786 (60.20%)

== Changes ==
=== Co-options ===
Party	Outgoing	LEA	Reason	Date	Co-optee
Fianna Fáil	Padraig Loughrey	Longford	Family and work commitments	19 January 2018	Joe Flaherty
Fine Gael	John Duffy	Granard	Work commitments	7 January 2019	Gerry Hagan

=== Changes in affiliation ===
Name	LEA	Elected as	New affiliation	Date
Gerry Warnock	Longford	Independent	Social Democrats	20 October 2015
Gerry Warnock	Longford	Social Democrats	Independent	17 September 2016
