= 1999 Longford County Council election =

Part of the 1999 Irish local elections

← 1991	10 June 1999	2004 →

All 21 seats to Longford County Council
	First party	Second party	Third party
Party	Fine Gael	Fianna Fáil	Progressive Democrats
Seats won	10	8	1
Seat change	+2	-1	+1
	Fourth party	Fifth party
Party	Republican Sinn Féin	Independent
Seats won	1	1
Seat change	-	-2
- Map showing the area of Longford County Council
Council control after election
TBD

An election to Longford County Council took place on 10 June 1999 as part of that year's Irish local elections. 21 councillors were elected from four local electoral areas for a five-year term of office on the system of proportional representation by means of the single transferable vote (PR-STV).

== Results by party ==
Party	Seats	±	First Pref. votes	FPv%	±%
Fine Gael	10	+2	7,146	41.26	
Fianna Fáil	8	-1	7,392	42.68	
Progressive Democrats	1	+1	717	4.14	
Republican Sinn Féin	1	-	478	2.76	
Independent	1	-2	1,533	8.85	
Totals	21	-	17,320	100.00	—

== Results by local electoral area ==
=== Ballymahon ===
Ballymahon - 6 seats
Party	Candidate	FPv%	Count									
Party	Candidate	FPv%	1	2	3	4	5	6	7	8	9	10
Fine Gael	James Bannon*	22.31	1,211									
Fianna Fáil	Barney Steele*	12.76	693	738	741	744	758	761	775	849		
Fine Gael	Patrick Belton	11.73	637	798								
Fine Gael	Adrian Farrell*	11.07	601	621	629	651	658	693	776			
Fine Gael	Seán Farrell*	10.83	588	644	649	651	659	676	691	787		
Fianna Fáil	John Nolan*	6.47	351	394	396	402	413	427	460	534	560	632
Independent	Patrick Walsh	6.28	341	360	360	363	368	375	380	395	400	
Fianna Fáil	Pat Farrell	5.18	281	338	339	343	349	355	373	431	451	507
Fianna Fáil	John Kenny	5.14	279	293	294	297	304	320	369			
Fianna Fáil	Pat O'Sullivan	3.78	205	206	206	207	210	240				
Independent	Tom Feeney	2.23	121	125	125	135	140					
Independent	Michael Brennan	1.23	67	79	81	82						
Labour	Michael Coffey	0.99	54	57	57							
Electorate: 7,379 Valid: 5,429 (73.57%) Spoilt: 63 Quota: 776 Turnout: 5,492 (74.43%)

=== Drumlish ===
Drumlish - 3 seats
Party	Candidate	FPv%	Count		
Party	Candidate	FPv%	1	2	3
Fianna Fáil	Luie McEntire*	32.00	736		
Fine Gael	Gerry Brady*	28.26	650		
Republican Sinn Féin	Seán Lynch*	14.10	478	532	579
Fianna Fáil	Benny Reid	18.96	436	542	569
Electorate: 3,358 Valid: 2,300 (68.49%) Spoilt: 15 Quota: 576 Turnout: 2,315 (69.94%)

=== Granard ===
Granard - 5 seats
Party	Candidate	FPv%	Count			
Party	Candidate	FPv%	1	2	3	4
Fine Gael	Frank Kilbride	16.58	669	721		
Fine Gael	Maura Kilbride-Harkin*	15.96	644	688		
Fine Gael	Martin Farrell	14.75	595	607	719	
Fianna Fáil	Jimmy Coyle*	13.41	541	577	718	
Independent	Noel Greene	11.95	482	490	514	527
Fianna Fáil	Brian Lynch*	11.03	445	544	629	651
Fianna Fáil	John Doherty	8.70	351	395		
Fianna Fáil	Fintan Flood*	7.63	308			
Electorate: 5,808 Valid: 4,035 (69.47%) Spoilt: 68 Quota: 673 Turnout: 4,103 (70.64%)

=== Longford ===
Longford - 7 seats
Party	Candidate	FPv%	Count				
Party	Candidate	FPv%	1	2	3	4	5
Fianna Fáil	Denis Glennon	13.95	775				
Fianna Fáil	Michael Nevin*	13.23	735				
Fine Gael	Alan Mitchell	13.12	729				
Progressive Democrats	Mae Sexton*	12.90	717				
Fianna Fáil	Peter Kelly*	12.87	715				
Fine Gael	Victor Kiernan*	9.49	527	539	545	619	746
Independent	Peter Murphy*	9.40	522	538	547	574	623
Fianna Fáil	Helen Quinn	6.01	334	359	371	428	487
Fine Gael	Peggy Nolan	5.31	295	309	317	337	
Fianna Fáil	Noel Conway	3.73	207	220	225		
Electorate: 8,598 Valid: 5,556 (64.62%) Spoilt: 86 Quota: 695 Turnout: 5,642 (65.62%)
