= Connolly Barracks =

Former military installation in Ireland

- Dún Ó Conghalaigh
- Longford
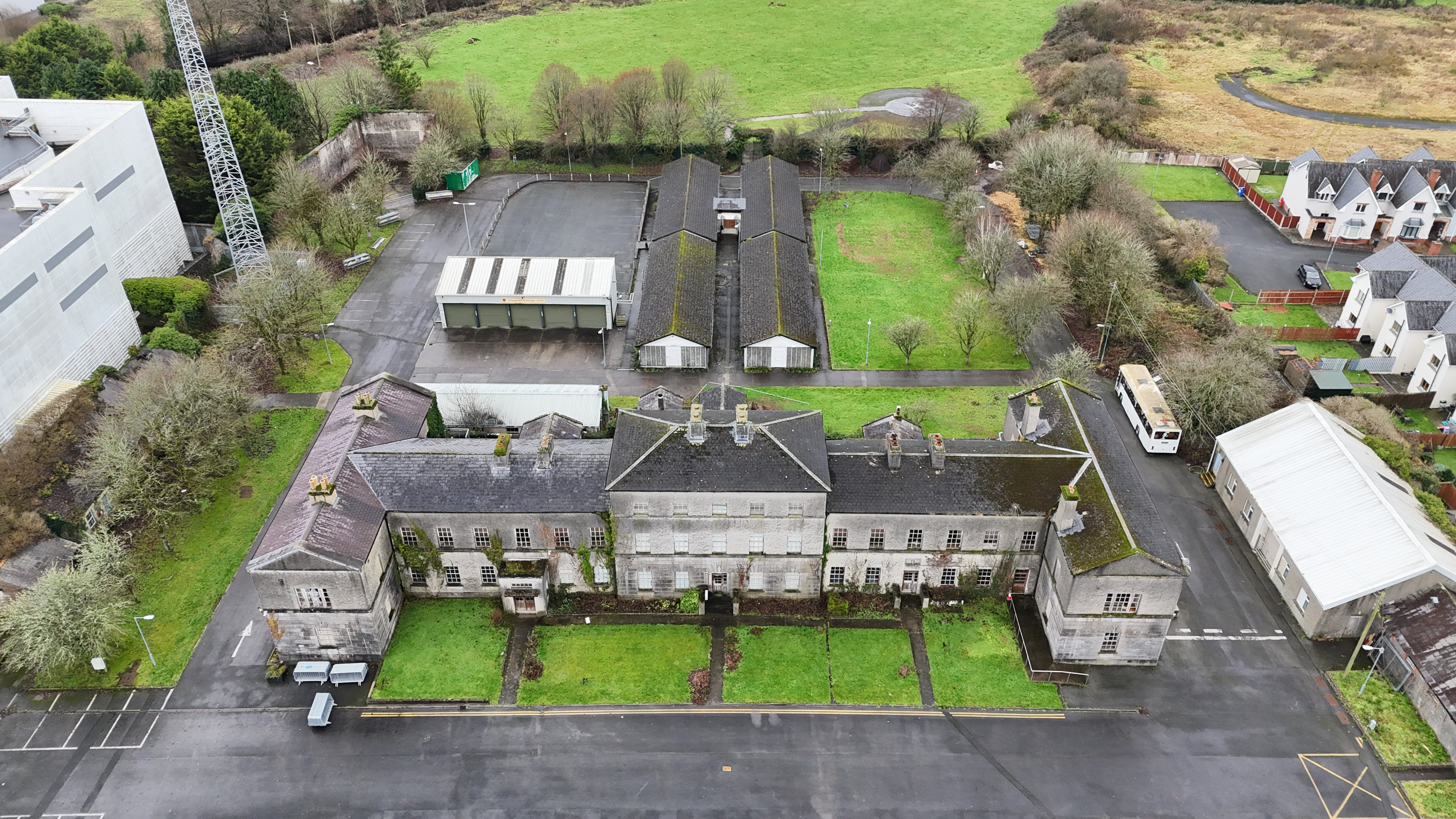
- Connolly Barracks in 2024

Site information
- Type: Barracks
- Operator: (Republic of Ireland) Irish Army

Location
- Location within Ireland
- Coordinates: 53.7312°N 7.8034°W

Site history
- Built: 1815
- Built for: War Office
- In use: 1815-2009

Connolly Barracks (Irish: Dún Ó Conghalaigh), previously known as the Longford Cavalry Barracks, is a former military installation in Longford, Ireland. The barracks was closed in 2009 and was purchased by Longford County Council in 2012.

== History ==
The War Office acquired the site, which originally consisted of a castle and a market house, from Thomas Pakenham, 1st Baron Longford in 1774 and established military facilities there in the late 18th century.

The main barrack building was designed by John Behan in the classical style and construction was completed in 1815. The barracks were handed over to the Irish Free State in February 1922 and were renamed Connolly Barracks after Sean Connolly, an Irish republican. The barracks served as the home of the 4th Cavalry Squadron from 1972 until the squadron moved to Custume Barracks on the closure of the barracks in January 2009. The site was purchased by Longford County Council in 2012.

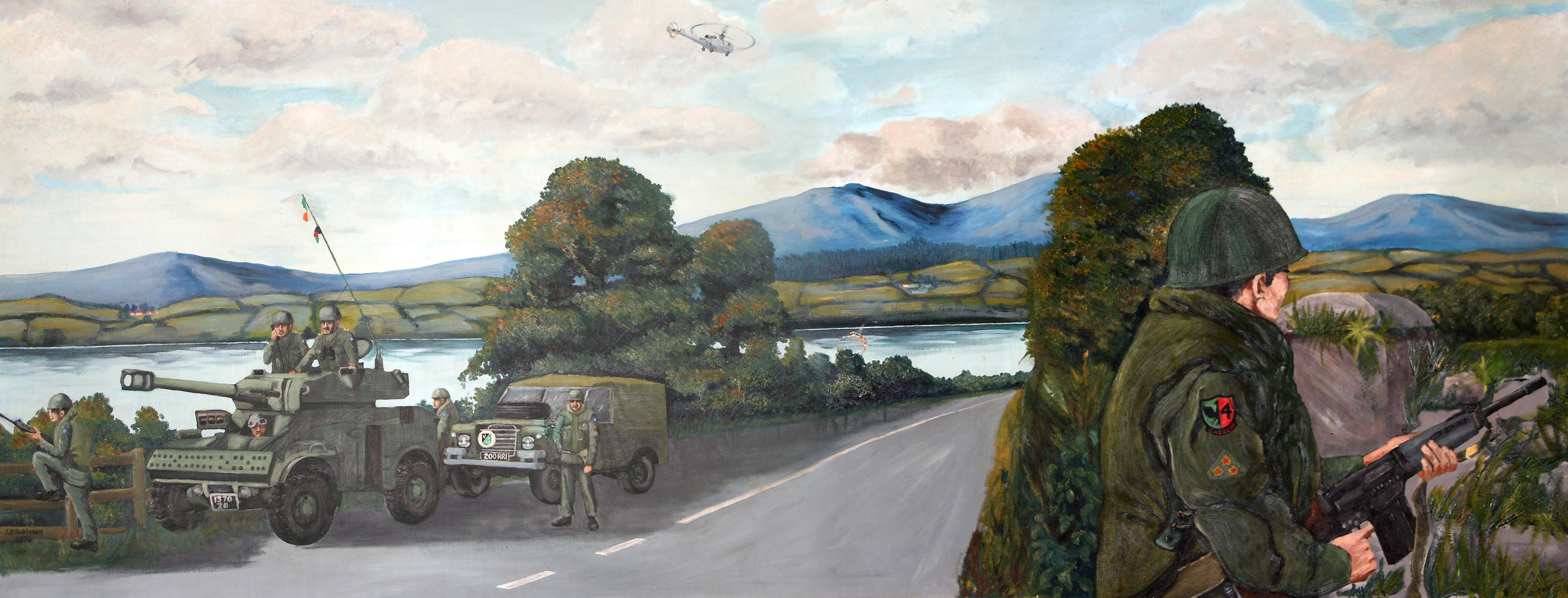
A mural previously located in the dining hall depicting the 4th Cavalry Squadron on a border patrol.

== See also ==
- List of Irish military installations
