= 2009 Longford County Council election =

Part of the 2009 Irish local elections

← 2004	5 June 2009	2014 →

21 seats on Longford County Council
	First party	Second party	Third party
Party	Fine Gael	Fianna Fáil	Independent
Seats won	10	8	3
Seat change	-1	-	+1
- Map showing the area of Longford County Council
Council control after election
TBD

An election to Longford County Council took place on 5 June 2009 as part of that year's Irish local elections. 21 councillors were elected from four local electoral areas (LEAs) for a five-year term of office on the electoral system of proportional representation by means of the single transferable vote (PR-STV).

== Results by party ==
Party	Seats	±	First Pref. votes	FPv%	±%
Fine Gael	10	-1	8,921	45.57	
Fianna Fáil	8	-	7,202	34.36	
Independent	3	+1	3,805	18.16	
Totals	21	-	20,958	100.00	—

== Results by local electoral area ==
=== Ballymahon ===
Ballymahon - 6 seats
Party	Candidate	FPv%	Count							
Party	Candidate	FPv%	1	2	3	4	5	6	7	8
Fine Gael	Larry Bannon*	15.13	925							
Fine Gael	Patrick Belton*	13.08	800	817	836	858	891			
Fianna Fáil	Barney Steele*	12.37	756	763	765	803	816	867	868	916
Fianna Fáil	Michael Cahill*	10.96	670	674	682	689	702	767	769	844
Fine Gael	Adrian Farrell*	10.48	641	647	648	649	661	684	690	726
Independent	Mark Casey	10.29	629	643	645	665	699	731	732	857
Fine Gael	Seán Farrell*	9.99	611	622	630	635	663	716	720	789
Independent	John Nolan	6.51	398	412	419	439	467	492	495	
Fianna Fáil	Anne Marie Nolan	3.99	244	253	255	264	274			
Labour	James Feeney	2.83	173	182	183	201				
Sinn Féin	Conor Nolan	2.68	164	171	172					
Independent	Michael Brennan	1.68	103							
Electorate: 8,836 Valid: 6,114 (69.19%) Spoilt: 68 Quota: 874 Turnout: 6,182 (69.96%)

=== Drumlish ===
Drumlish - 4 seats
Party	Candidate	FPv%	Count			
Party	Candidate	FPv%	1	2	3	4
Fianna Fáil	Martin Mulleady*	19.75	886	915		
Fine Gael	Gerry Brady*	18.24	818	893	901	
Fine Gael	John Duffy	16.99	762	834	836	1,039
Fianna Fáil	Luie McEntire*	16.77	752	793	797	899
Fianna Fáil	P.J. Mulligan	11.37	510	546	548	634
Fine Gael	Martin Farrell*	9.63	432	461	462	
Republican Sinn Féin	Seán Lynch	5.33	239			
Sinn Féin	Ciaran Grimes	1.92	86			
Electorate: 6,289 Valid: 4,485 (71.31%) Spoilt: 47 Quota: 898 Turnout: 4,532 (72.06%)

=== Granard ===
Granard - 4 seats
Party	Candidate	FPv%	Count			
Party	Candidate	FPv%	1	2	3	4
Fianna Fáil	P.J. Reilly*	16.87	677	731	803	
Fine Gael	Micheál Carrigy	16.77	673	735	783	858
Fine Gael	Frank Kilbride*	16.67	669	695	739	798
Fianna Fáil	Thomas Victory	14.60	586	625	641	704
Fine Gael	Maura Kilbride-Harkin*	11.88	477	488	534	640
Independent	Brian Lynch	8.12	326	351	407	
Independent	Tommy Stokes	8.00	321	349		
Fianna Fáil	Margaret Connell	5.90	237			
Sinn Féin	Jack Mulvey	1.20	48			
Electorate: 5,810 Valid: 4,014 (69.09%) Spoilt: 68 Quota: 803 Turnout: 4,058 (69.85%)

=== Longford ===
Longford - 7 seats
Party	Candidate	FPv%	Count						
Party	Candidate	FPv%	1	2	3	4	5	6	7
Fine Gael	Peggy Nolan*	15.42	978						
Fianna Fáil	Padraig Loughrey	13.40	850						
Independent	Mae Sexton	9.76	619	658	667	713	818		
Fine Gael	Alan Mitchell*	9.30	590	636	640	661	727	807	
Fine Gael	Victor Kiernan*	8.61	545	563	569	590	653	690	699
Fianna Fáil	Seamus Butler*	8.43	535	549	559	578	597	656	657
Independent	Paul Connell	8.29	526	536	540	592	629	731	736
Fianna Fáil	Denis Glennon*	7.85	499	513	527	545	610	668	677
Independent	Peter Murphy*	7.05	447	458	461	481			
Independent	Michael Nevin*	6.86	436	450	454	497	552		
Sinn Féin	Brendan Farrell	2.73	173	180	181				
Labour	Seamus Keaveney	2.32	147	157	158				
Electorate: 9,565 Valid: 6,344 (66.33%) Spoilt: 104 Quota: 794 Turnout: 6,448 (67.41%)
