= County Hall, Longford =

Municipal building in County Longford, Ireland

- Áras an Chontae, Longfoirt
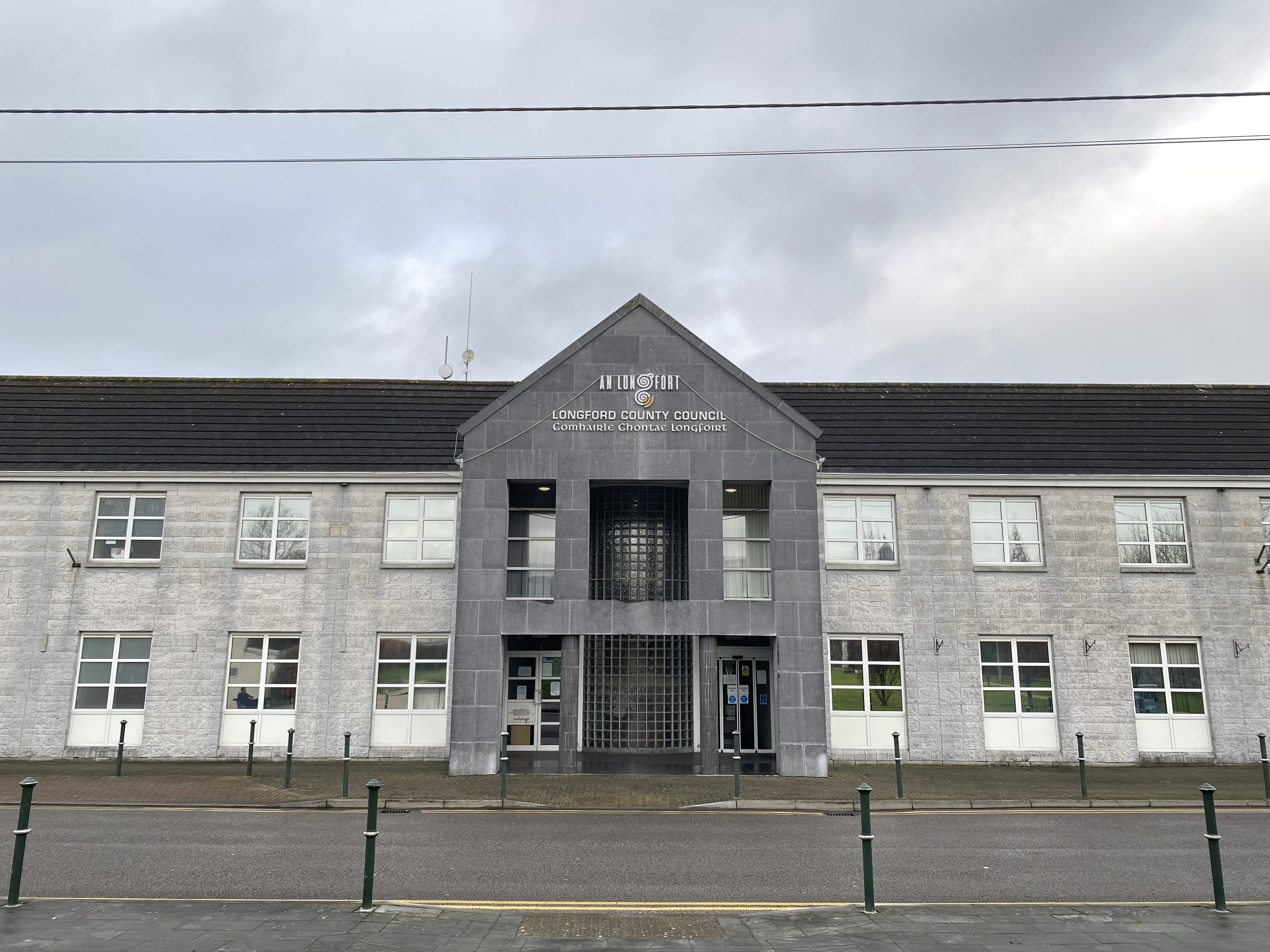
- Longford County Hall in 2024

- Location within Ireland

General information
- Architectural style: Modern style
- Location: Great Water Street, Longford, County Longford, Ireland
- Coordinates: 53.7304°N 7.7985°W
- Completed: 1992

County Hall (Irish: Áras an Chontae, Longfoirt) is a municipal facility in Longford, County Longford, Ireland.

== History ==
The site currently occupied by County Hall was once used as a fowl market. Meetings of Longford County Council had previously taken place in Longford Courthouse and a county secretary's office had been established in Dublin Road. The county council meetings and county administration moved to modern facilities at the new County Hall in Great Water Street in 1992. In 2018 the county council announced proposals for a new bridge to link County Hall to the Albert Reynolds Peace Park.
