= Uruemu Adejinmi =

Irish politician

Cllr Uruemu Adejinmi

Longford County Councillor
- Incumbent
- Assumed office 25 February 2020
- Constituency: Longford

Cathaoirleach of Longford County Council
- In office June 2021 – June 2022
- Preceded by: Paul Ross
- Succeeded by: Peggy Nolan

Cathaoirleach of Longford Municipal District
- Incumbent
- Assumed office June 2025
- Preceded by: Seamus Butler

Personal details
- Born: Warri, Delta State, Nigeria
- Party: Fianna Fáil
- Spouse: Kenny Adejinmi
- Children: 3
- Website: Uruemu Adejinmi

Ureumu Adejinmi is an Irish Fianna Fáil politician. She has been a councillor in Longford County Council since 2020 and was Cathaoirleach of the council from 2021 to 2022. She was the first African woman to become an elected representative on the council and the first black woman in Ireland to be elected to the position of Cathaoirleach/Mayor. She was elected as Cathaoirleach of Longford Municipal District in June 2025.

== Political career ==
Adejinmi first ran for election to Longford County Council in the 2019 Local elections finishing 10th in the seven-seater Longford local electoral area. She was subsequently co-opted to the council to fill the seat vacated by her party colleague, Joe Flaherty, following the latter's election to the 33rd Dáil at the 2020 general election.

In 2021, Adejinmi was elected Cathaoirleach of Longford County Council making her the first migrant, first African and first black female to become Cathaoirleach/Mayor in Ireland.

Also in 2021, Adejinmi unsuccessfully sought the Fianna Fáil nomination for the 2021 Seanad by-election on the Industrial and Commercial Panel. Party colleague Gerry Horkan was ultimately nominated and went on to win the seat

Adejinmi was re-elected to Longford County Council in the 2024 Local elections, representing the Longford local electoral area.

In 2025, she was tipped as a possible Taoiseach's nominee to the 27th Seanad following criticism of a lack of female representation in the Oireachtas, however her local party colleague, Joe Flaherty, was nominated instead, having lost his seat in the Dáil in the 2024 general election and having failed to get elected to the Cultural and Educational panel in the 2025 Seanad election.

In June 2025, Adejinmi was elected as Cathaoirleach of Longford Municipal District, and in May 2026 she was elected vice president of Fianna Fáil at the party's Ardfheis in Dublin.

== Personal life ==
Uruemu grew up in Warri, Delta State, Nigeria in a middle-class household and has a degree in mathematics. She moved to Ireland in 2003 and lives in Longford with her husband and three children.
