= 2024 Longford County Council election =

Part of the 2024 Irish local elections

- 7 June 2024

All 18 seats on Longford County Council 10 seats needed for a majority
	First party	Second party	Third party
Party	Fianna Fáil	Fine Gael	Independent
Last election	7	8	3
- Area of Longford County Council

An election to all 18 seats on Longford County Council was held on 7 June 2024 as part of the 2024 Irish local elections. County Longford is divided into 3 local electoral areas (LEAs) to elect councillors for a five-year term of office on the electoral system of proportional representation by means of the single transferable vote (PR-STV).

== Results by party ==
Party	Candidates	Seats	±	1st pref	FPv%	±%
Fine Gael	10	8	▼1	9,068	43.03	▲3.76
Fianna Fáil	10	8	▲2	6,398	30.36	▼2.11
Sinn Féin	3	0	Steady	1,339	6.35	▲1.77
The Irish People	2	0	New	284	1.35	New
Green	1	0	New	92	0.44	New
People Before Profit	1	0	New	71	0.34	New
Independent	12	2	▼1	3,820	18.13	▼5.07
Total	39	18	Steady	21,072	100.00	Steady

== Results by local electoral area ==
*: Outgoing councillor elected in 2014.
†: Outgoing councillor coopted subsequent to the 2014 election.

=== Ballymahon ===
Ballymahon: 6 Seats
Party	Candidate	FPv%	Count						
Party	Candidate	FPv%	1	2	3	4	5	6	7
Fine Gael	Paul Ross	18.52%	1,300						
Fianna Fáil	Mick Cahill	12.34%	866	938	949	994	1,013		
Fianna Fáil	Pat O'Toole	10.17%	714	743	753	908	927	928	970
Independent	Mark Casey	9.06%	636	650	685	744	929	933	1,093
Fianna Fáil	Sean Mimnagh	8.45%	593	601	612	628	800	801	843
Fine Gael	Martin Skelly	8.28%	581	629	637	664	762	763	843
Independent	Gerald Farrell	8.02%	563	567	590	627			
Sinn Féin	John Rooney	8.01%	562	598	638	678	695	695	
Fine Gael	Colm Murray	7.66%	538	603	615	654	693	696	748
Independent	Niall Dowler	6.05%	425	440	489				
The Irish People	Mandy Larkin	2.29%	161	165					
Independent	Francesca Pawelczyk	1.14%	80	82					
Electorate: 12,067 Valid: 7,019 Spoilt: 74 Quota: 1,003 Turnout: 7,093 (58.78%)

=== Granard ===
Granard: 5 Seats
Party	Candidate	FPv%	Count						
Party	Candidate	FPv%	1	2	3	4	5	6	7
Fine Gael	Garry Murtagh	20.41%	1,450						
Independent	Turlough McGovern	19.89%	1,413						
Fine Gael	Paraic Brady	17.04%	1,211						
Fine Gael	Colin Dalton	11.54%	820	883	918	953	972	1,059	1,067
Fine Gael	Padraig McNamara	9.84%	699	735	850	881	1,035	1,111	1,113
Fianna Fáil	David Cassidy	7.64%	543	600	615	661	717	1,055	1,071
Fianna Fáil	Susan Murphy	6.11%	434	510	524	552	613		
Fianna Fáil	Marett Smith	3.97%	282	295	323	336			
Sinn Féin	Barry Campion	3.56%	253	273	294				
Electorate: 10,955 Valid: 7,105 Spoilt: 63 Quota: 1,185 Turnout: 7,168 (65.43%)

=== Longford ===
Longford: 7 Seats
Party	Candidate	FPv%	Count													
Party	Candidate	FPv%	1	2	3	4	5	6	7	8	9	10	11	12	13	14
Fine Gael	Gerard Hagan	15.69%	1,071													
Fianna Fáil	Martin Monaghan	15.40%	1,051													
Fianna Fáil	Seamus Butler	15.25%	1,041													
Fine Gael	Peggy Nolan	13.04%	890													
Fine Gael	Niall Gannon	7.44%	508	606	658	721	734	738	751	751	762	773	779	786	821	843
Fianna Fáil	Kevin Hussey	6.49%	443	475	523	560	568	571	576	580	600	606	610	615	650	666
Fianna Fáil	Uruemu Adejinmi	6.32%	431	467	501	551	555	555	559	563	569	616	617	642	670	767
Sinn Féin	James Donnelly	5.88%	401	414	425	431	434	437	439	455	463	471	482	484	498	533
Independent	Mujahid Manzoor	3.25%	222	223	225	225	225	225	226	227	231	236	237			
Independent	Sadia Athar	2.97%	203	204	207	211	212	213	217	232	238	249	257	347	361	
The Irish People	Gareth McKendry	1.80%	123	126	128	130	130	141	145	149	155	155				
Independent	James Quinn	1.67%	114	132	160	167	169	179	192	198	211	214	254	258		
Green	Catherine Joseph	1.35%	92	95	98	101	102	102	105	113	114					
People Before Profit	Dave Smyth	1.04%	71	72	74	76	76	77	77							
Independent	Alicia Carberry	1.00%	68	71	77	83	85	91	99	104						
Independent	Maura Greene-Casey	0.78%	53	58	60	66	67	70								
Independent	Tony Reilly	0.44%	30	33	36	37	38									
Independent	Dwain Schouten	0.19%	13	13	14	14	14									
Electorate: 13,843 Valid: 6,825 Spoilt: 95 Quota: 854 Turnout: 6,920 (49.99%)

== Changes ==
=== Changes in affiliation ===
Name	LEA	Elected as	New affiliation	Date
Turlough McGovern	Granard	Independent	Independent Ireland	28 August 2026
Mark Casey	Ballymahon	Independent	Independent Ireland	23 September 2026
