= 1985 Longford County Council election =

Part of the 1985 Irish local elections

- 20 June 1985

All 21 seats on Longford County Council
	First party	Second party	Third party
Party	Fianna Fáil	Fine Gael	Independent
Seats won	10	9	2
Seat change	+2	-	-
	Fourth party
Party	Sinn Féin
Seats won	0
Seat change	-2
- Map showing the area of Longford County Council
Council control after election
TBD

An election to Longford County Council took place on 20 June 1985 as part of the 1985 Irish local elections. 21 councillors were elected from four local electoral areas (LEAs) for a five-year term of office on the electoral system of proportional representation by means of the single transferable vote (PR-STV). This term was extended for a further year, to 1991.

== Results by party ==
Party	Seats	±	First Pref. votes	FPv%	±%
Fianna Fáil	10	+2	7,721	46.18	
Fine Gael	9	-	6,393	38.24	
Independent	2	-	1,961	11.73	
Sinn Féin	0	-2	645	3.86	
Totals	21	-	16,720	100.00	—

== Results by local electoral area ==
=== Ballinalee ===
Ballinalee: 4 seats
Party	Candidate	FPv%	Count				
Party	Candidate	FPv%	1	2	3	4	5
Fianna Fáil	James Coyle	26.4%	839				
Fianna Fáil	Michael Doherty	23.06%	733				
Fine Gael	Pat Stenson	16.9%	537	556	567	627	687
Fine Gael	Andy Dalton	14%	445	464	478	546	572
Independent	Bertie Moorhead	9.5%	302	326	338	370	
Fine Gael	Kathleen Murray	5.07%	161	175	179		
Fianna Fáil	Gerry Nevin	5.07%	161	288	344	353	427
Electorate: 4,279 Valid: 3,178 (74.27%) Quota: 636

=== Ballymahon ===
Ballymahon: 6 seats
Party	Candidate	FPv%	Count						
Party	Candidate	FPv%	1	2	3	4	5	6	7
Fine Gael	James Bannon	14.45%	712						
Fianna Fáil	Barney Steele	14.33%	706						
Fine Gael	Louis J. Belton	11.75%	579	618	628	758			
Fianna Fáil	James Dowler	11.28%	556	557	559	588	636	644	647
Independent	Michael Brennan	9.9%	488	508	559	607	544	654	660
Fine Gael	Adrian Farrell	9.28%	457	498	586	626	695	730	
Fianna Fáil	Paddy Farrell	9.21%	454	499	541	547	674	675	676
Fianna Fáil	Lorcan Connaughton	5.48%	270	276	317	332			
Fine Gael	Bernard Hackett	5.38%	265	291	293				
Independent	Tom Farrell	4.75%	234	258					
Fine Gael	John Farrell	4.18%	206						
Electorate: 6,152 Valid: 4,927 (80.09%) Quota: 704

=== Drumlish ===
Drumlish: 3 seats
Party	Candidate	FPv%	Count		
Party	Candidate	FPv%	1	2	3
Fianna Fáil	Luie McEntire	32.68%	853		
Fine Gael	Gerry Brady	30.5%	796		
Fianna Fáil	Seán Mulleady	19.39%	506	644	704
Sinn Féin	Seán Lynch	17.43%	455	517	600
Electorate: 3,150 Valid: 2,610 (82.86%) Quota: 653

=== Granard ===
Granard: 3 seats
Party	Candidate	FPv%	Count			
Party	Candidate	FPv%	1	2	3	4
Fianna Fáil	Brian Lynch	29.45%	713			
Fianna Fáil	Fintan Flood	24.25%	587	662		
Fine Gael	Maura Kilbride-Harkin	22.88%	554	567	567	606
Fine Gael	James Reilly	13.59%	329	338	348	362
Fine Gael	Matt Murtagh	5.52%	141	148	153	169
Sinn Féin	Liam Browne	4.01%	97	100	117	
Electorate: 3,163 Valid: 2,421 (76.54%) Quota: 606

=== Longford ===
Longford: 5 seats
Party	Candidate	FPv%	Count								
Party	Candidate	FPv%	1	2	3	4	5	6	7	8	9
Fianna Fáil	Peter Kelly	21.32%	764								
Fine Gael	Seamous Finnan	14.93%	535	544	552	571	588	685			
Independent	Peter Murphy	14.56%	522	538	551	562	583	639			
Independent	Michael Nevin	11.58%	415	434	462	476	498	522	525	541	545
Fine Gael	Peter Clarke	9.68%	347	366	369	385	400	533	612		
Fine Gael	Philo Kelly	9.18%	329	342	345	370	381				
Fianna Fáil	Noel McGeeney	7.09%	254	291	304	352	471	518	522	542	552
Fianna Fáil	Michael Brewster	4.55%	163	184	191						
Fianna Fáil	Tony Egan	4.52%	162	192	201	248					
Sinn Féin	Seamus McDonnell	2.59%	93	95							
Electorate: 5,154 Valid: 3,584 (69.54%) Quota: 598
