= Longford Courthouse =

- Teach Cúirte Longfoirt
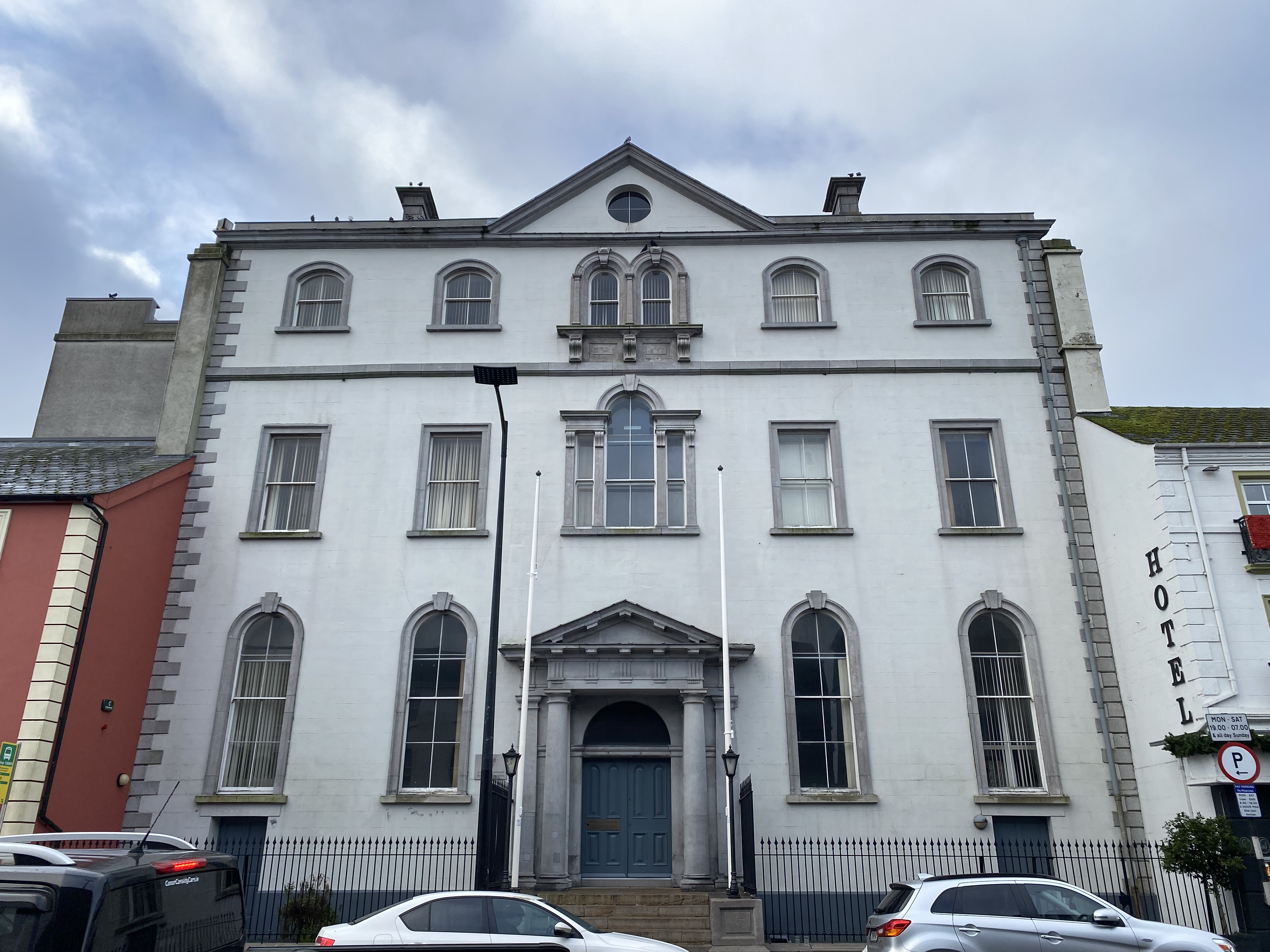
- Longford Courthouse in 2024

- Location within Ireland

General information
- Architectural style: Neoclassical style
- Location: Main Street, Longford, County Longford, Ireland
- Coordinates: 53.7284°N 7.8017°W
- Completed: 1795

Longford Courthouse is a judicial facility in Main Street, Longford, County Longford, Ireland.

== History ==
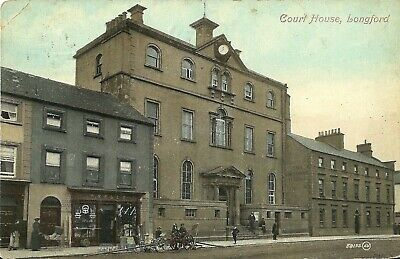
Early 20th century photograph

The courthouse, which was designed in the neoclassical style and built in ashlar stone, was completed in around 1795. The design involved a symmetrical main frontage of five bays facing Main Street; there was a short flight of steps leading up to a doorway with Doric order columns supporting an entablature and a pediment. There was a Venetian window on the first floor, a pair of mullioned windows on the second floor and a pediment containing an oculus above.

The building was originally used as a facility for dispensing justice but, following the implementation of the Local Government (Ireland) Act 1898, which established county councils in every county, it also became the meeting place for Longford County Council. A county secretary's office was subsequently established in Dublin Road. The courthouse fell into a state of disrepair, and after the county council had moved to County Hall at Great Water Street in 1992 and the Courts Service had started using alternative premises in 1994, an extensive programme of refurbishment works was carried out and completed in 2006.
