= 1991 Longford County Council election =

Part of the 1991 Irish local elections

- 27 June 1991

All 21 seats on Longford County Council
	First party	Second party	Third party
Party	Fianna Fáil	Fine Gael	Republican Sinn Féin
Seats won	9	8	1
Seat change	-	-1	+1
	Fourth party	Fifth party
Party	Independent	Sinn Féin
Seats won	3	0
Seat change	+1	-1
- Map showing the area of Longford County Council
Council control after election
TBD

An election to Longford County Council took place on 27 June 1991 as part of that year's Irish local elections. 21 councillors were elected from four local electoral areas (LEAs) for a five-year term of office on the electoral system of proportional representation by means of the single transferable vote (PR-STV). This term was extended twice, first to 1998, then to 1999.

== Results by party ==
Party	Seats	±	First Pref. votes	FPv%	±%
Fianna Fáil	9	-	5,391	37.32	-8.86
Fine Gael	8	-1	5,544	38.37	+0.13
Republican Sinn Féin	1	+1	536	3.71	New
Independent	3	+1	2,158	14.94	+3.21
Sinn Féin	0	-1	-	-	-3.86
Totals	21	-	14,447	100.00	—

== Results by local electoral area ==
=== Ballinalee ===
Ballinalee - 3 seats
Party	Candidate	FPv%	Count		
Party	Candidate	FPv%	1	2	3
Fianna Fáil	Jimmy Coyle*	30.5%	719		
Fianna Fáil	Michael Doherty*	30%	709		
Fine Gael	Victor Kiernan	21.5%	508	567	655
Fine Gael	Sean MacEoin	18%	424	493	523
Electorate: 3,294 Valid: 2,360 (71.65%) Spoilt: 23 Quota: 591 Turnout: 2,383 (72.34%)

=== Ballymahon ===
Ballymahon - 6 seats
Party	Candidate	FPv%	Count						
Party	Candidate	FPv%	1	2	3	4	5	6	7
Fine Gael	James Bannon*	22.3%	1,060						
Fianna Fáil	Barney Steele*	15.6%	741						
Fine Gael	Louis Belton TD*	13.9%	660	840					
Fine Gael	Adrian Farrell*	12.9%	612	623	668	669	693		
Fianna Fáil	Paddy Farrell*	7.2%	340	346	349	365	392	448	650
Independent	John Nolan	6.8%	323	364	383	391	414	514	624
Fine Gael	Seán Farrell	6.4%	306	347	391	395	453	509	528
Fianna Fáil	Tony Carthy	6.1%	290	358	372	393	395	426	
Independent	Michael Brennan*	5.1%	241	270	297	309	341		
Independent	Declan Gilmore	3.6%	173	178	181				
Electorate: 6,361 Valid: 4,746 (74.61%) Spoilt: 34 Quota: 679 Turnout: 4,780 (75.15%)

=== Drumlish ===
Drumlish - 3 seats
Party	Candidate	FPv%	Count	
Party	Candidate	FPv%	1	2
Fine Gael	Gerry Brady*	29%	656	
Fianna Fáil	Luie McEntire*	26%	588	
Republican Sinn Féin	Seán Lynch*	23.7%	536	585
Fianna Fáil	Claire Brady-Casey	21.2%	480	521
Electorate: 3,072 Valid: 2,260 (73.57%) Spoilt: 38 Quota: 566 Turnout: 2,298 (74.8%)

=== Granard ===
Granard - 3 seats
Party	Candidate	FPv%	Count
Party	Candidate	FPv%	1
Fianna Fáil	Fintan Flood*	Unopposed	N/A
Fine Gael	Maura Kilbride-Harkin*	Unopposed	N/A
Fianna Fáil	Brian Lynch*	Unopposed	N/A
Electorate: 3,017 Valid: 0 Spoilt: 0 Quota: 0 Turnout: 0

=== Longford ===
Longford - 6 seats
Party	Candidate	FPv%	Count						
Party	Candidate	FPv%	1	2	3	4	5	6	7
Independent	Mae Sexton	17.4%	740						
Fianna Fáil	Peter Kelly*	16.2%	690						
Fine Gael	Philo Kelly	12.5%	532	571	580	610			
Independent	Peter Murphy*	10%	426	444	451	463	494	530	567
Fine Gael	Seamus Finnan*	7.7%	330	337	341	383	398	420	588
Fianna Fáil	Michael Nevin	7%	299	310	326	350	413	538	586
Fine Gael	Peter Clarke*	6.5%	278	290	297	325	354	404	
Fianna Fáil	Brendan McDermott	6.4%	274	295	301	314	369	412	473
Fianna Fáil	Noel McGeeney*	6.1%	261	268	294	303	332		
Independent	Christy Warnock	6%	255	267	270	280			
Fine Gael	Jimmy Kane	4.2%	178	181	183				
Electorate: 6,475 Valid: 4,263 (65.84%) Spoilt: 29 Quota: 610 Turnout: 4,292 (66.29%)
