= 2004 Longford County Council election =

Part of the 2004 Irish local elections

- 11 June 2004

All 21 seats on Longford County Council
	First party	Second party	Third party
Party	Fine Gael	Fianna Fáil	Independent
Seats won	11	8	2
Seat change	+1	-	+1
	Fourth party	Fifth party
Party	Progressive Democrats	Republican Sinn Féin
Seats won	0	0
Seat change	-1	-1
- Map showing the area of Longford County Council
Council control after election
Fine Gael

An election to Longford County Council took place on 11 June 2004 as part of that year's Irish local elections. 21 councillors were elected from four local electoral areas (LEAs) for a five-year term of office on the electoral system of proportional representation by means of the single transferable vote (PR-STV).

== Results by party ==
Party	Seats	±	First Pref. votes	FPv%	±%
Fine Gael	11	+1	7,597	38.92	
Fianna Fáil	8	-	6,887	35.29	
Independent	2	+1	2,083	10.67	
Progressive Democrats	0	-1	721	3.70	
Republican Sinn Féin	0	-1	441	2.26	
Totals	21	-	19,518	100.00	—

== Results by local electoral area ==
=== Ballymahon ===
Ballymahon - 6 seats
Party	Candidate	FPv%	Count						
Party	Candidate	FPv%	1	2	3	4	5	6	7
Fine Gael	Larry Bannon*	18.72	1,075						
Fine Gael	Patrick Belton*	15.43	886						
Fianna Fáil	Barney Steele*	13.27	762	786	794	811	959		
Fine Gael	Adrian Farrell*	11.60	666	693	702	738	753	758	795
Fine Gael	Seán Farrell*	9.25	531	592	613	683	732	745	815
Fianna Fáil	Mark Casey	8.29	476	484	486	520	528	540	640
Fianna Fáil	John Nolan*	6.74	387	431	442	463	487	501	
Fianna Fáil	Michael Cahill	6.71	385	434	439	462	514	543	681
Progressive Democrats	P.J. Walsh	5.38	309	332	338	364			
Sinn Féin	Bernard Flood	3.45	198	208	210				
Independent	Tom Nee	0.59	34	38	39				
Independent	Caroline Daly	0.56	32	36	36				
Electorate: 8,150 Valid: 5,741 (70.44%) Spoilt: 91 Quota: 821 Turnout: 5,832 (71.56%)

=== Drumlish ===
Drumlish - 3 seats
Party	Candidate	FPv%	Count	
Party	Candidate	FPv%	1	2
Fianna Fáil	Luie McEntire*	26.69	740	
Fine Gael	Gerry Brady*	26.25	728	
Fianna Fáil	Martin Mulleady	19.15	531	671
Republican Sinn Féin	Seán Lynch*	15.90	441	574
Progressive Democrats	Peter Prunty	8.15	226	
Sinn Féin	Ciaran Grimes	3.86	107	
Electorate: 3,896 Valid: 2,773 (71.18%) Spoilt: 34 Quota: 694 Turnout: 2,807 (72.05%)

=== Granard ===
Granard - 5 seats
Party	Candidate	FPv%	Count							
Party	Candidate	FPv%	1	2	3	4	5	6	7	8
Fine Gael	Frank Kilbride*	20.47	914							
Fianna Fáil	P.J. Reilly	11.91	532	543	553	580	616	653	700	713
Fine Gael	Maura Kilbride-Harkin*	11.04	493	534	544	592	636	649	706	738
Fine Gael	Martin Farrell*	10.77	481	512	520	533	583	652	829	
Fianna Fáil	Brian Lynch*	10.41	465	479	486	521	548	579	623	631
Fianna Fáil	Jimmy Coyle*	9.58	428	448	454	463	500	570	657	688
Progressive Democrats	Declan Fox	7.93	354	374	386	401	436	531		
Fianna Fáil	John Doherty	7.03	314	323	325	331	348			
Independent	James Reynolds	5.17	231	241	255	272				
Labour	Seán Howard	3.76	168	176	185					
Sinn Féin	Jimmy Magee	1.93	86	90						
Electorate: 6,377 Valid: 4,466 (70.03%) Spoilt: 68 Quota: 745 Turnout: 4,543 (71.24%)

=== Longford ===
Longford - 7 seats
Party	Candidate	FPv%	Count									
Party	Candidate	FPv%	1	2	3	4	5	6	7	8	9	10
Fine Gael	Peggy Nolan	12.60	824									
Independent	Peter Murphy*	10.04	657	665	680	697	723	724	779	822		
Independent	Michael Nevin*	10.04	657	662	682	694	732	733	787	801	803	875
Fianna Fáil	Denis Glennon*	8.79	575	584	605	631	711	712	735	835		
Fine Gael	Victor Kiernan*	8.18	535	543	561	570	581	582	598	660	662	711
Fianna Fáil	Seamus Butler*	7.15	468	480	494	521	548	548	564	615	624	718
Fine Gael	Alan Mitchell*	7.09	464	470	487	505	519	521	544	575	576	710
Progressive Democrats	Liam Madden*	7.02	459	470	480	491	508	508	515	552	554	
Independent	Paul Connell	6.89	451	359	371	428	487					
Sinn Féin	Jimmy McDonnell	5.04	330	340	366	378	393	393				
Fianna Fáil	Michael Hegarty	4.98	326	330	337	365	396	396	417			
Fianna Fáil	Tony Flaherty	4.34	284	286	294	319						
Fianna Fáil	Brendan Kearney	3.27	214	215	218							
Labour	Oliver Barry	2.72	178	196								
Green	Parvez Butt	1.51	99									
Independent	Liam Madden	0.32	21									
Electorate: 10,098 Valid: 6,542 (64.79%) Spoilt: 119 Quota: 818 Turnout: 6,661 (65.96%)
