= Paraic Brady =

Irish politician

Senator Paraic Brady
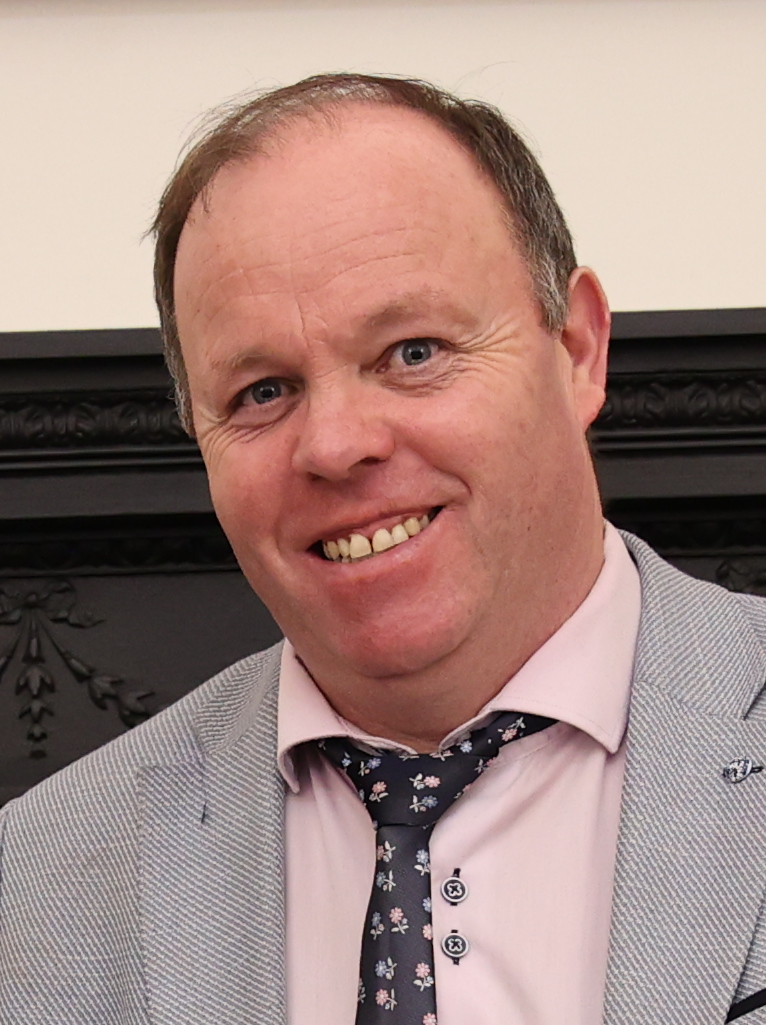
- Brady in 2025

Senator
- Incumbent
- Assumed office January 2025
- Constituency: Agricultural Panel

Personal details
- Born: 1972/1973 (age 52–53) County Longford, Ireland
- Party: Fine Gael
- Spouse: Caroline Brady
- Children: 4

Paraic Brady (born 1972/1973) is an Irish Fine Gael politician who has been a senator for the Agricultural Panel since January 2025.

He was a member of Longford County Council for the Granard area from May 2014 to January 2025.

From Drumlish in North Longford, Brady is a farmer, and played inter-county football for the Longford county team, with whom he won the 2000 O'Byrne Cup.
