= Longford County Council =

Local authority of County Longford, Ireland

Longford County Council Comhairle Chontae an Longfoirt
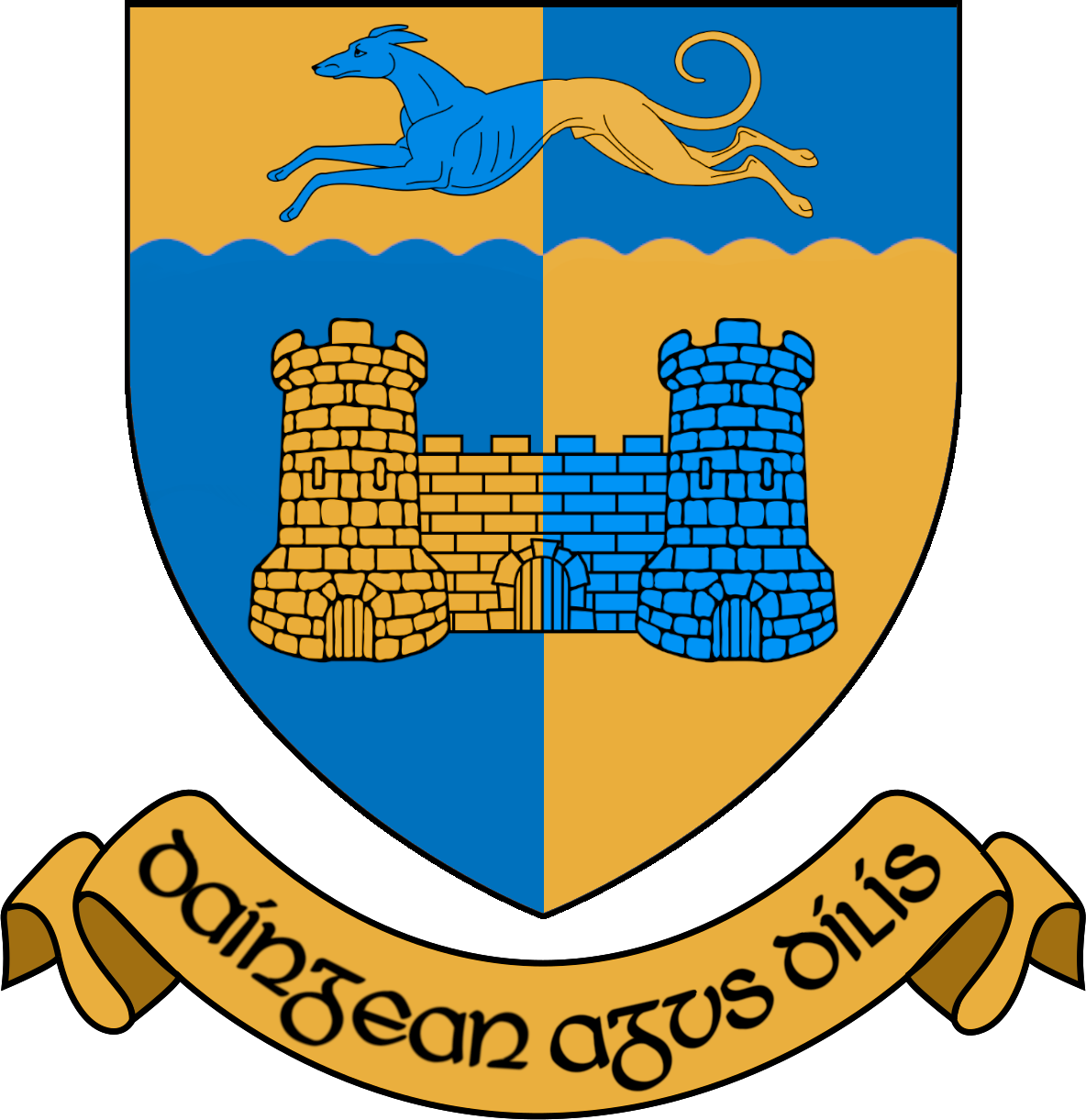

Type
- Type: County council of County Longford

History
- Founded: 1 April 1899

Leadership
- Cathaoirleach: Gerry Hagan, FG

Structure
- Seats: 18
- Political groups: Fianna Fáil (8) Fine Gael (8) Independent Ireland (2)

Elections
- Last election: 7 June 2024

Motto
- Daingean agus Dílis (Irish) "Strong and Loyal"

Meeting place
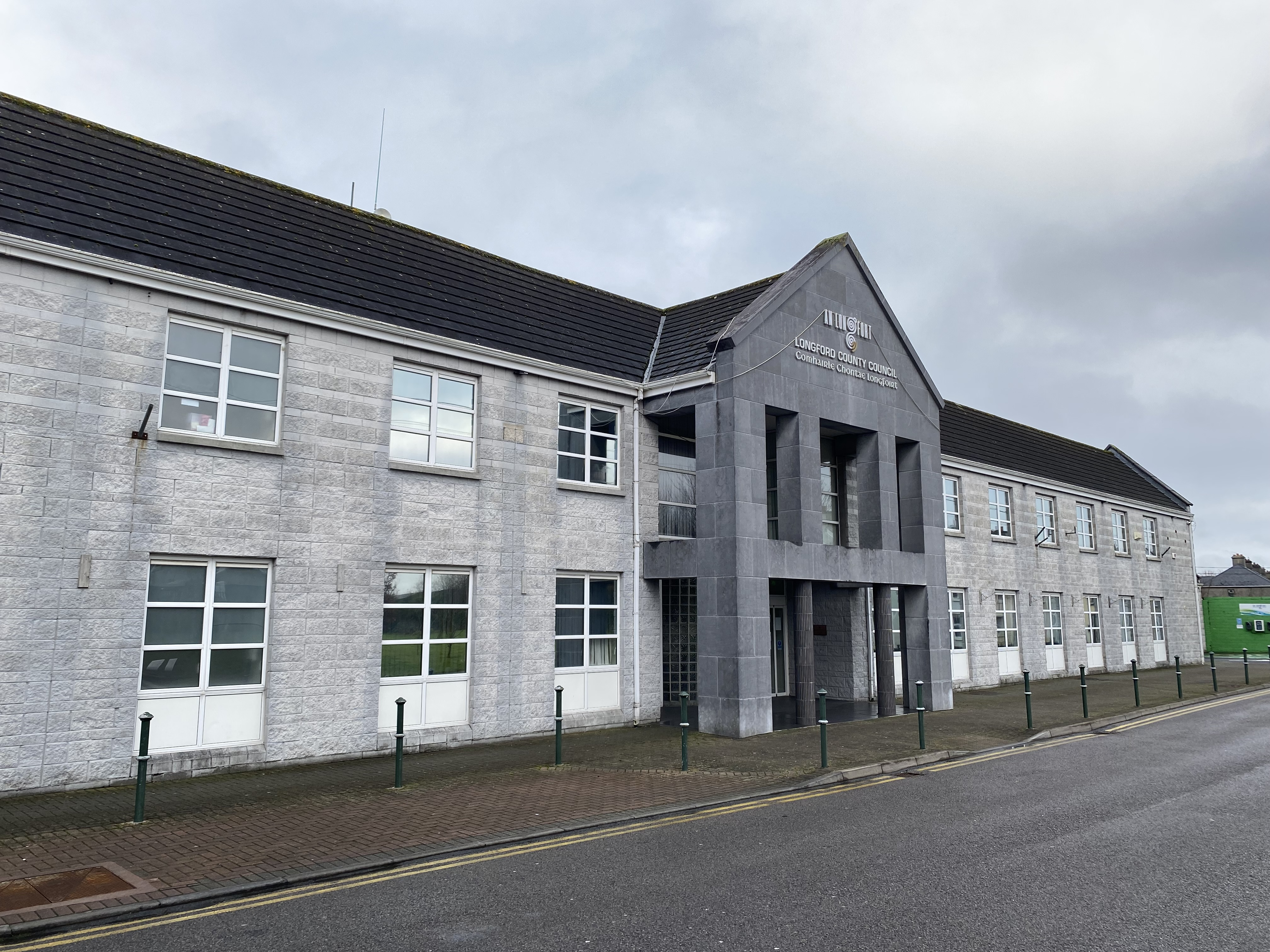
- Áras an Chontae, Longford

Website
- Official website

The area governed by the council

Longford County Council (Irish: Comhairle Chontae an Longfoirt) is the local authority of County Longford, Ireland. As a county council, it is governed by the Local Government Act 2001. The council is responsible for housing and community, roads and transportation, urban planning and development, amenity and culture, and environment. The council has 18 elected members. Elections are held every five years and are by single transferable vote. The head of the council has the title of Cathaoirleach (chairperson). The county administration is headed by a chief executive, Paddy Mahon. The county town is Longford.

== History ==
Longford County Council was established on 1 April 1899 under the Local Government (Ireland) Act 1898 for the administrative county of County Longford, succeeding the former judicial county of Longford.

Originally meetings of Longford County Council were held at Longford Courthouse in the Main Street and the county secretary's office was subsequently established in Dublin Road. The county council meetings and county administration moved to modern facilities at the new County Hall in Great Water Street in 1992.

== Regional Assembly ==
Longford County Council has two representatives on the Eastern and Midland Regional Assembly who are part of the Midland Strategic Planning Area Committee.

== Elections ==
The Local Government (Ireland) Act 1919 introduced the electoral system of proportional representation by means of the single transferable vote (PR-STV) for the 1920 Irish local elections. This electoral system has been retained, with the 18 members of Longford County Council elected for a five-year term of office from multi-member local electoral areas (LEAs).

Year	FG	FF	PDs	RSF	Ind.	Total
2024	8	8	—N/a	0	2	18
2019	9	6	—N/a	0	3	18
2014	8	7	—N/a	0	3	18
2009	10	8	—N/a	0	3	21
2004	11	8	0	0	2	21
1999	10	8	1	1	1	21
1991	8	9	0	1	3	21
1985	9	10	—N/a	—N/a	2	21

== Local electoral areas and municipal districts ==
The LEAs and the municipal districts are defined by electoral divisions.

LEA and Municipal district	Electoral divisions	Seats
Ballymahon	Agharra, Ardagh East, Ardagh West, Ballymahon, Ballymuigh, Cashel East, Cashel West, Doory, Forgney, Foxhall, Kilcommock, Kilglass, Killashee, Ledwithstown, Meathas Truim (Edgeworthstown), Mountdavis, Moydow and Rathcline	6
Granard	Abbeylara, Aghaboy, Ballinalee, Ballinamuck East, Ballinamuck West, Bunlahy, Columbkille, Coolamber, Creevy, Crosagstown, Currygrane, Dalystown, Drumgort, Drumlish, Drummeel, Firry, Gelshagh, Granard Rural, Granard Urban, Killoe, Knockanbaun, Lislea, Milltown, Moatfarrell, Moyne, Mullanalaghta, Newgrove and Sonnagh	5
Longford	Breanrisk, Caldragh, Cloondara, Cloonee, Corboy, Longford No. 1 Urban, Longford No. 2 Urban, Longford Rural and Newtown Forbes	7

== Councillors ==
=== 2024 seats summary ===
Party	Seats
Fianna Fáil	8
Fine Gael	8
Independent	2

=== Councillors by electoral area ===
This list reflects the order in which councillors were elected on 7 June 2024 at the 2024 Longford County Council election.

Council members from 2024 election
Local electoral area	Name	Party
Ballymahon	Paul Ross	Fine Gael
Ballymahon	Mick Cahill	Fianna Fáil
Ballymahon	Pat O'Toole	Fianna Fáil
Ballymahon	Mark Casey (Note: Changed party, see table below for details.)	Independent
Ballymahon	Sean Mimnagh	Fianna Fáil
Ballymahon	Martin Skelly	Fine Gael
Granard	Garry Murtagh	Fine Gael
Granard	Turlough McGovern	Independent
Granard	Paraic Brady	Fine Gael
Granard	Pádraig McNamara	Fine Gael
Granard	David Cassidy	Fianna Fáil
Longford	Gerry Hagan	Fine Gael
Longford	Martin Monaghan	Fianna Fáil
Longford	Séamus Butler	Fianna Fáil
Longford	Peggy Nolan	Fine Gael
Longford	Niall Gannon	Fine Gael
Longford	Kevin Hussey	Fianna Fáil
Longford	Uruemu Adejinmi	Fianna Fáil

==== Changes in affiliation ====
Name	LEA	Elected as	New affiliation	Date
Turlough McGovern	Granard	Independent	Independent Ireland	28 August 2026
Mark Casey	Ballymahon	Independent	Independent Ireland	23 September 2026
