= Longford =

Town in County Longford, Ireland

Longford An Longfort (Irish)
- Town
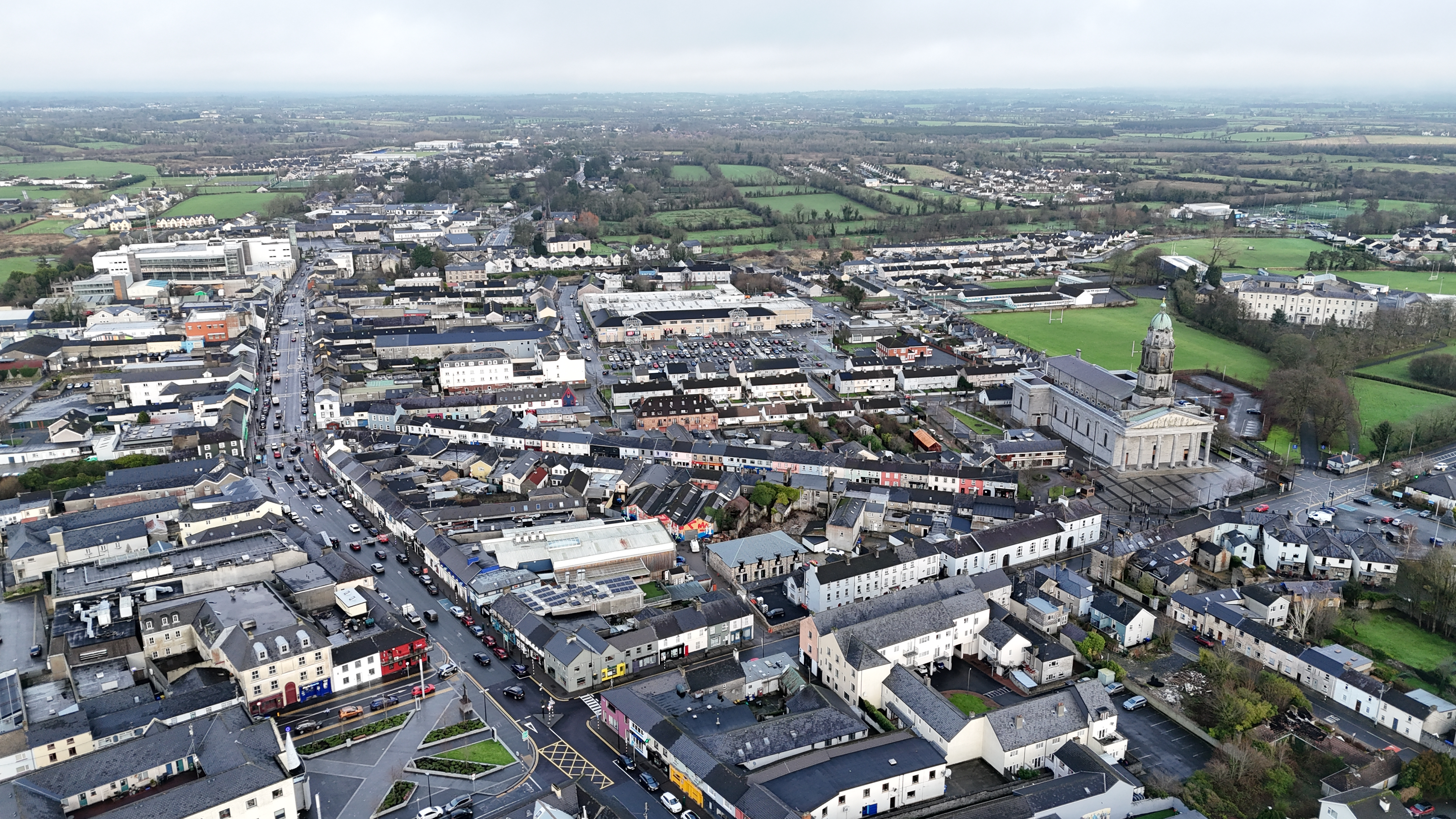
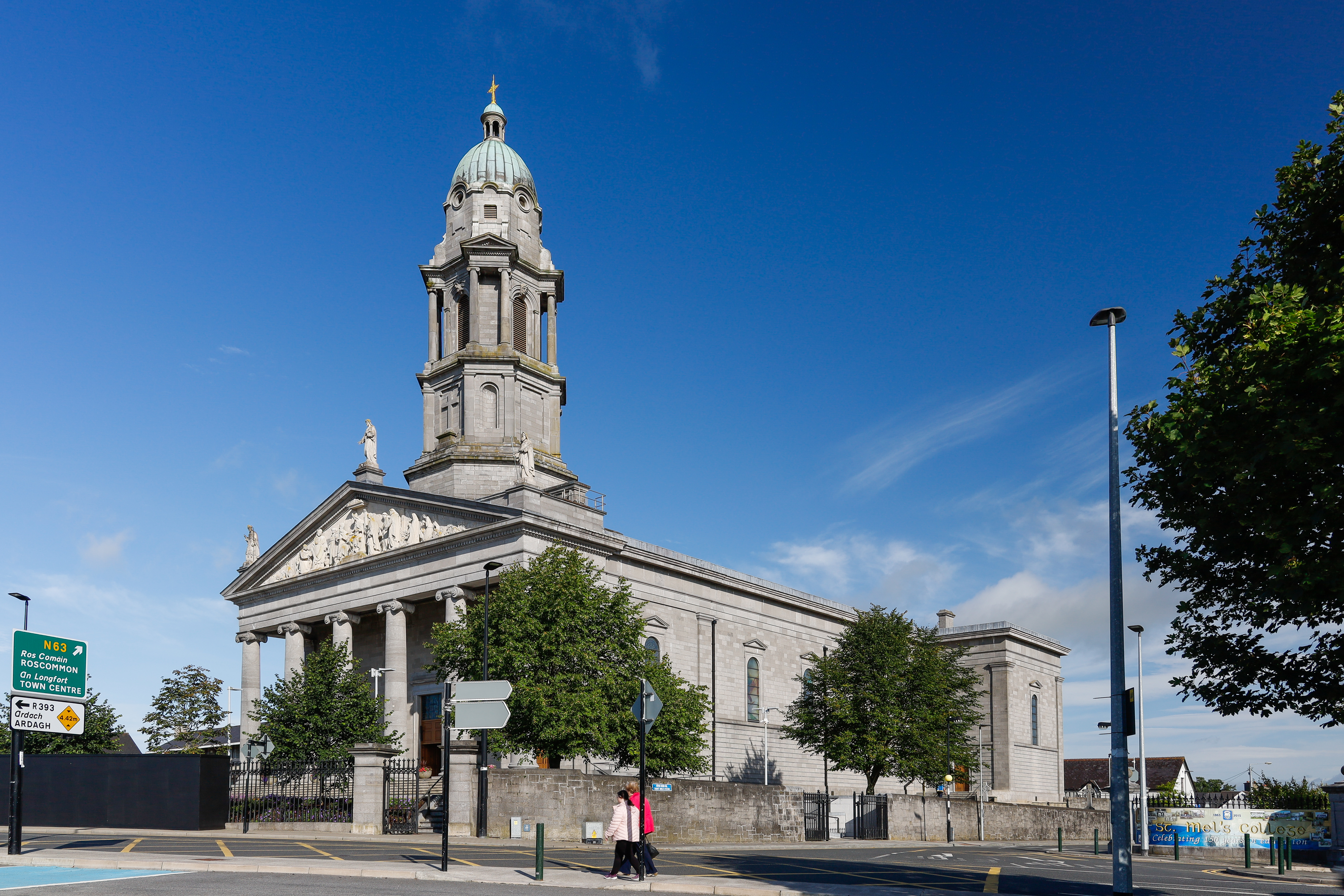
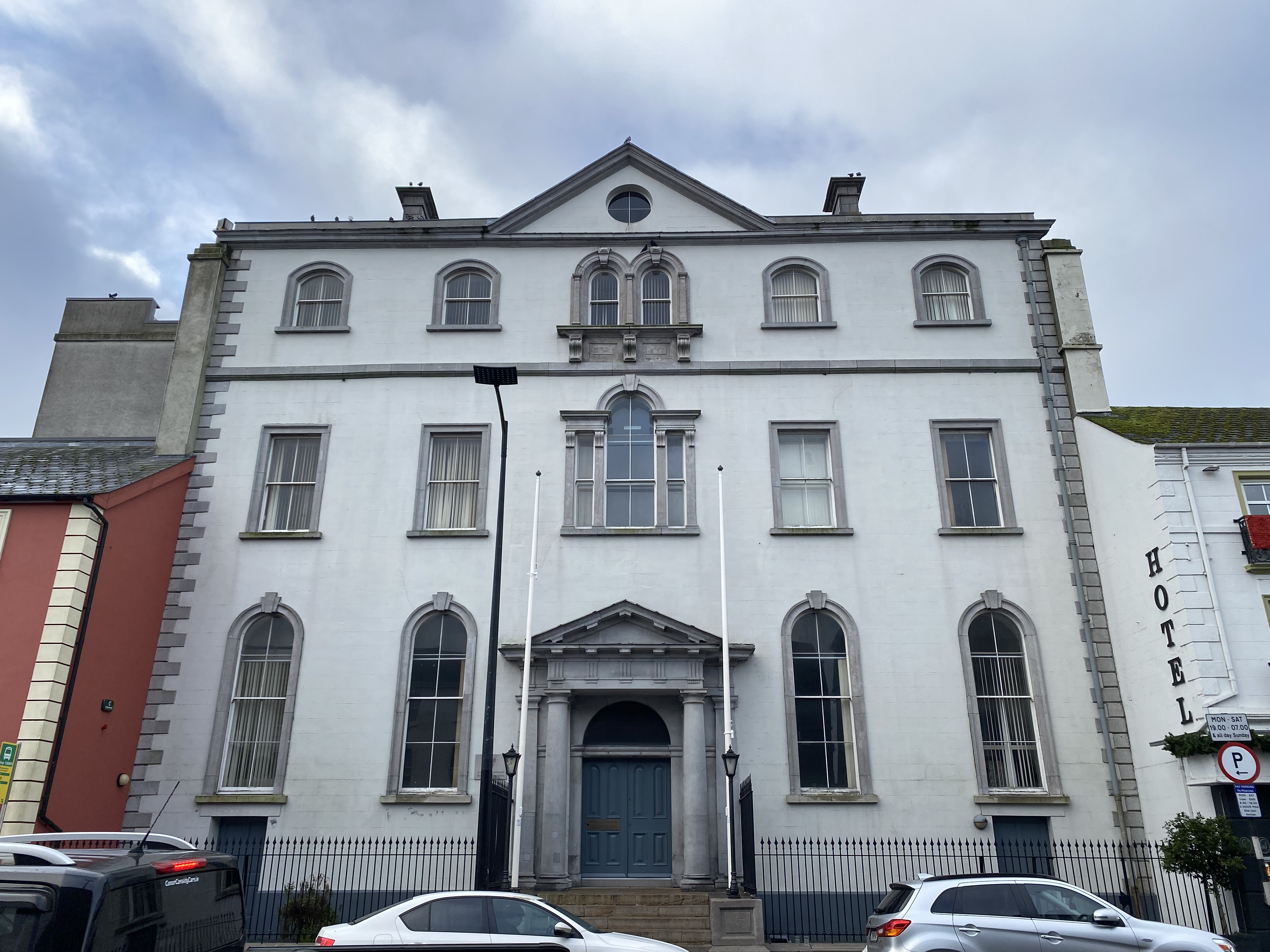
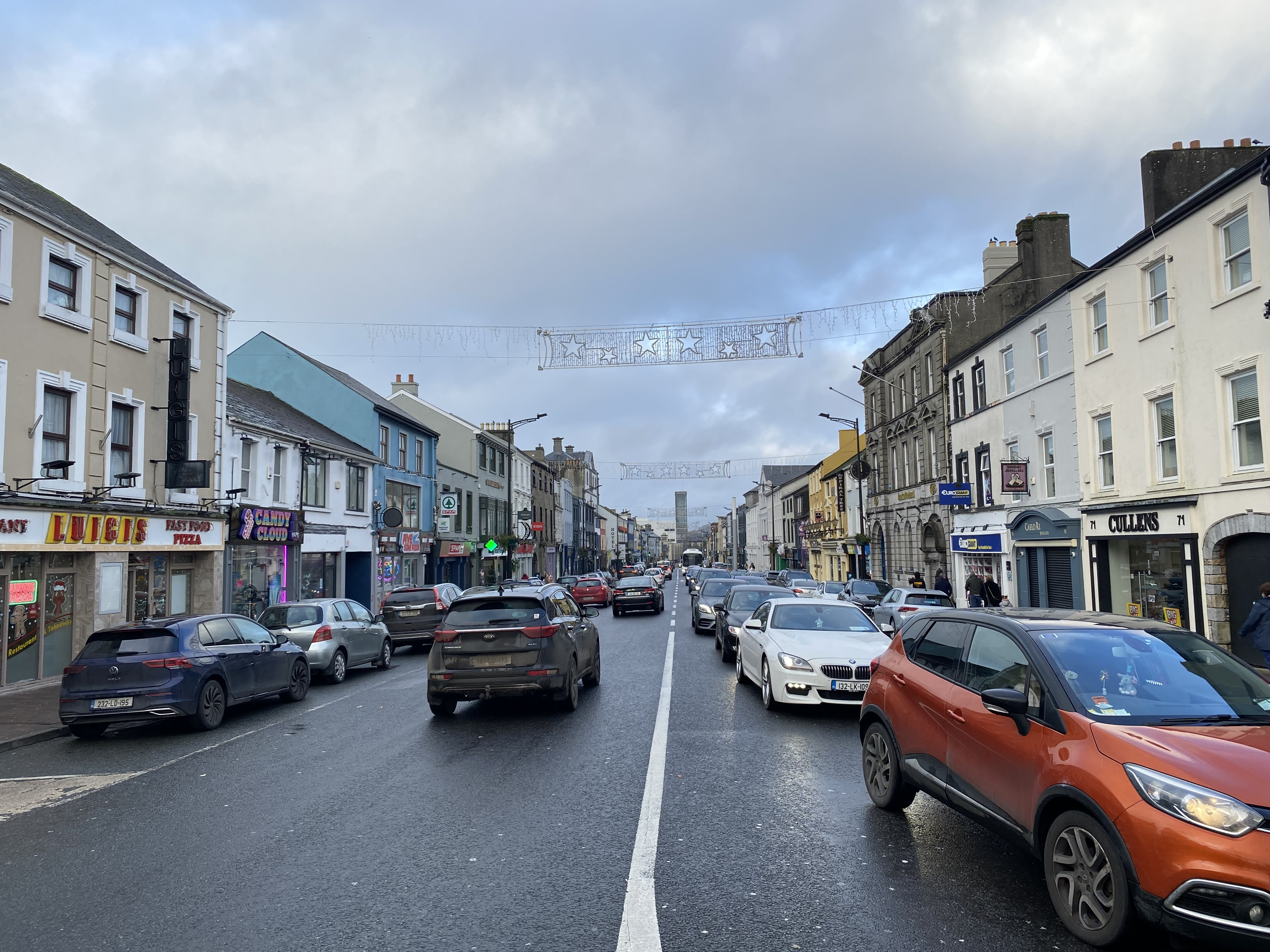
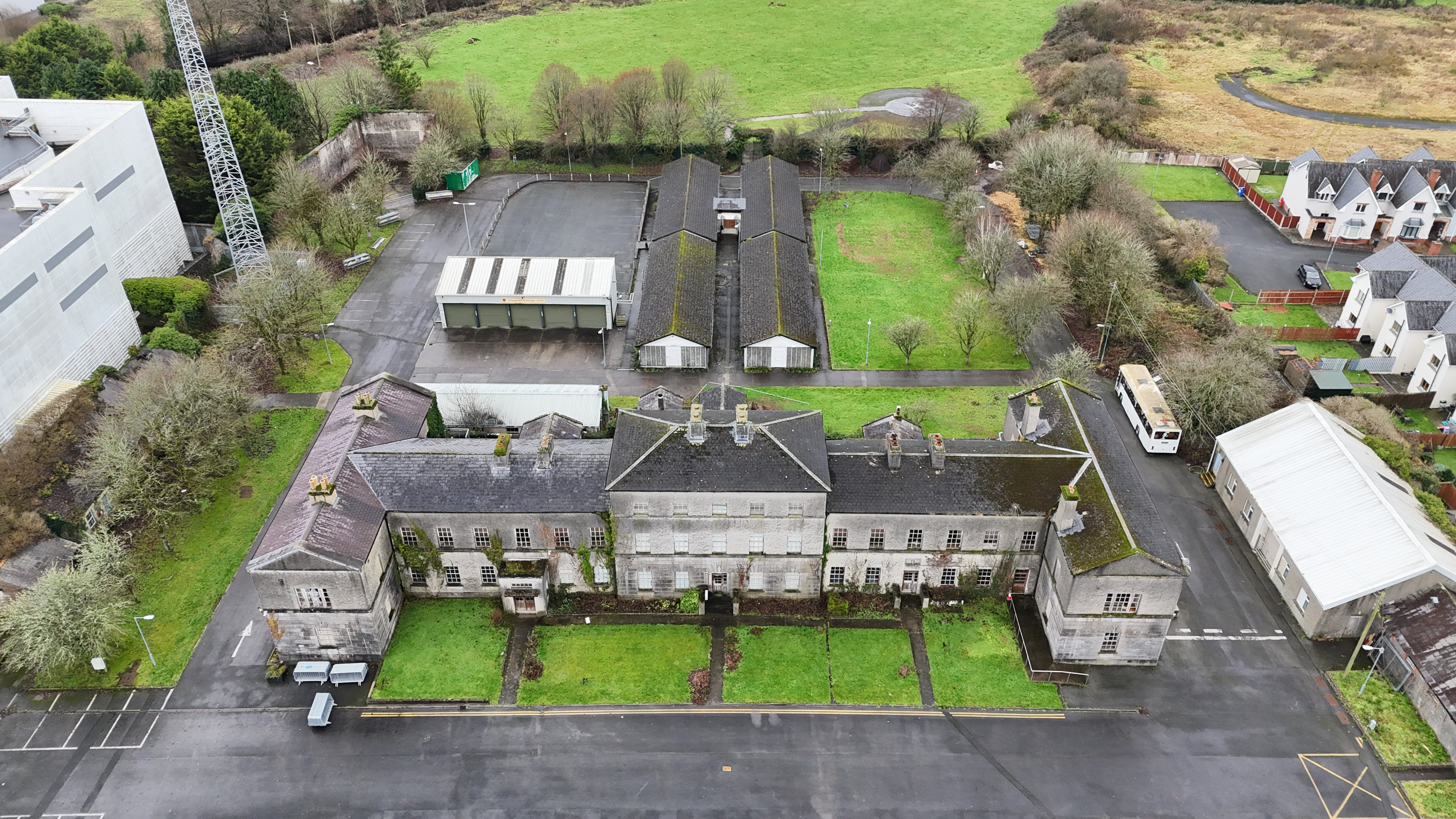
- Town skyline St Mel's Cathedral Longford Courthouse Main Street Connolly Barracks

- Location in Ireland
- Coordinates: 53.727°N 7.800°W
- Country: Ireland
- Province: Leinster
- County: County Longford
- Elevation: 72 m (236 ft)

Population (2022)
  - Rank: 46th
  - Urban: 10,952
- Time zone: UTC±0 (WET)
  - Summer (DST): UTC+1 (IST)
- Eircode routing key: N39
- Telephone area code: 043
- Irish Grid Reference: N135750
- Website: www.longford.ie

Longford (Irish: An Longfort) is the county town of County Longford in Ireland. It had a population of 10,952 at the 2022 census. It is the biggest town in the county and about one third of the county's population lives there. Longford lies at the meeting of Ireland's N4 and N5 roads, which means that traffic travelling between Dublin and County Mayo, or north County Roscommon passes around the town. Longford railway station, on the Dublin-Sligo line, is used heavily by commuters.

== History ==
The town is built at a fording point on the banks of the River Camlin (from Irish Camlinn, meaning 'crooked pool'), which is a tributary of the River Shannon. According to several sources, the name Longford is an Anglicization of the Irish Longphort, referring to a fortress or fortified house.

The area came under the sway of the local clan which controlled the south and central County Longford (historically called Anghaile or Annaly) and hence, the town was known as Longfort Uí Fhearghail (fort/stronghold of O'Farrell).

A Dominican priory was founded there in 1400. St. John's Church of Ireland (formerly known as Templemichael Parish Church) was built on the site of the priory in 1710.

In 1605, King James I granted Baron Delvin (Sir Richard Nugent) the right to hold a Thursday market, a fair in August, and the related baronial courts in Longford/Annaly.

In 1815, the Longford Cavalry Barracks was established by the British Army in the town.

A spur of the Royal Canal, linking the main canal to Longford town was completed in 1831. Construction on the Royal Canal had begun in May 1790 and concluded in 1817 with the successful joining of Dublin with the River Shannon at Cloondara, County Longford, but had bypassed Longford town itself.

From at least the 1830s, The Royal Canal Company offered cheap fares on night boats along the canal for passengers wishing to get from Longford to Dublin, and vice versa. The Irish Waterways History website describes the conditions under which the night boat service operated in the late 1830s: "From 1838 the night boat from Dublin left at two o'clock each afternoon; the boat from Longford left at half-past two. The night boat schedule was arranged to allow links with Charles Bianconi's cars, which linked Longford with Carrick-on-Shannon, Boyle and Sligo". The journey from Dublin to Longford by boat took 17 hours. In November 1845, one of the night boats sank en route to Longford on the outskirts of Dublin, killing 15 people.

In February 1922, following Irish independence, the Cavalry Barracks in Longford were handed over to the Irish Free State and renamed Connolly Barracks after Sean Connolly, an Irish republican.

== Places of interest ==
Located to the south of Longford, in Keenagh, is the visitor centre of the Corlea Trackway. It houses a preserved 18-metre stretch of Iron Age bog road, which was built in c. 148 BC. There are also a number of portal dolmens located around Longford.

Longford is the cathedral town of the Roman Catholic Diocese of Ardagh and Clonmacnoise. St Mel's Cathedral, dedicated to Saint Mel, the founder of the diocese of Ardagh, was built between 1840 and 1856. It was designed by architect John Benjamin Keane and features several stained glass windows by Harry Clarke studios. These include one of Clarke's earliest works, The consecration of St. Mel as Bishop of Longford, which was exhibited at the RDS Annual Art Industries Exhibition in 1910, where it received second prize. The cathedral was extensively damaged in a fire on Christmas Day 2009. It remained closed for five years after the fire, while it was the centre of one of the largest restoration projects undertaken in Europe. It reopened for services at midnight mass on Christmas Eve 2014.

Longford has a 212-seat theatre called Backstage Theatre just outside of the town, established in 1995.

In a 2003 Guardian article about Patrick McCabe, Longford's "features of distinction" are described as including "a hulking cathedral, a rash of fast-food joints, a grubby cinema and a shopping mall".

Historical population
Year	Pop.	±%
1813	3,062	—
1821	3,783	+23.5%
1831	4,516	+19.4%
1841	4,966	+10.0%
1851	4,467	−10.0%
1861	4,819	+7.9%
1871	4,375	−9.2%
1881	4,380	+0.1%
1891	3,827	−12.6%
1901	3,747	−2.1%
1911	3,760	+0.3%
1926	3,685	−2.0%
1936	3,807	+3.3%
1946	4,020	+5.6%
1951	3,845	−4.4%
1956	4,167	+8.4%
1961	4,073	−2.3%
1966	4,129	+1.4%
1971	4,791	+16.0%
1981	6,548	+36.7%
1986	6,835	+4.4%
1991	6,824	−0.2%
1996	6,984	+2.3%
2002	7,557	+8.2%
2006	8,836	+16.9%
2011	9,601	+8.7%
2016	10,008	+4.2%
2022	10,952	+9.4%

== Economy ==
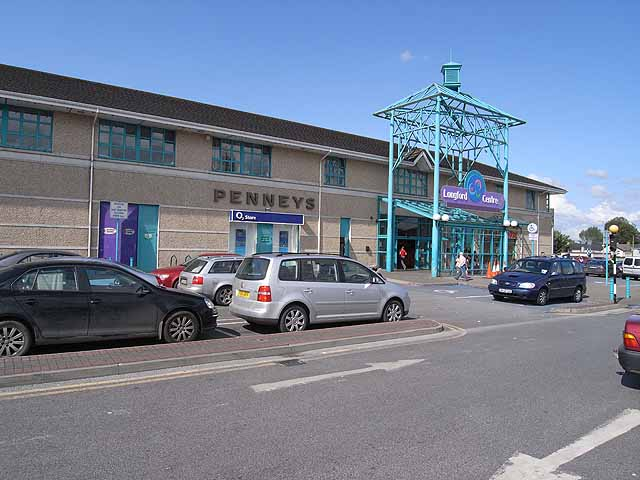
Longford Shopping Centre

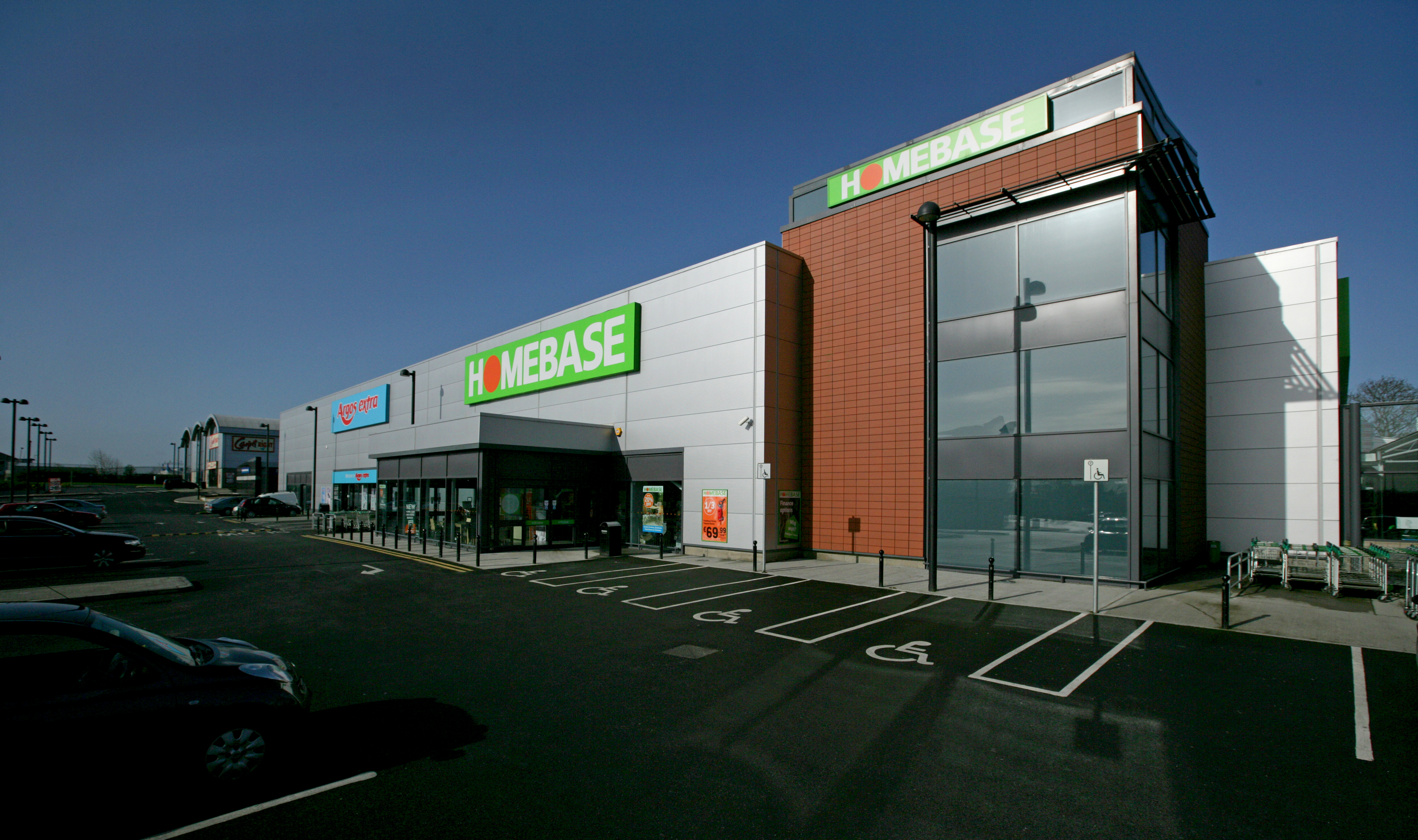
Homebase and Argos outlets at the N4 Axis Centre in the town (2007)

Longford is the main centre for economic activity in the county and is home to a number of retail, commercial, service, agri-business, food processing, medical and biopharmaceutical industries.

Longford Shopping Centre, opened in 1993, has a number of retail outlets including Tesco and Penneys. The N4 Axis Centre, opened in 2005, is also located in the town.

Longford is home to a four-screen cinema, operated by Omniplex Cinemas. In 2018, plans were announced to redevelop the vacant shopping centre, Longford Town Centre, following the acquisition of the building by Omniplex. As of 2026, the project has not proceeded.

The headquarters of the Irish Prison Service were moved from Clondalkin to Longford in 2007. A centre for the Department of Social Protection opened in the town in 2014.

Connolly Barracks once employed approximately 180 soldiers, many of whom were involved in UN peace-keeping duties, until the barracks closed in January 2009.

== Education ==
Longford town has a number of primary schools (for ages 4–12) and three secondary schools (for ages 12–19): two single-sex schools, St. Mel's College (a Catholic boys' school), and Scoil Mhuire (a Catholic girls' school run by the Sisters of Mercy), as well as Templemichael College (a mixed school). Primary schools in Longford include a Gaelscoil and St. Joseph's National School.

St. Mel's College is the oldest of these schools, being founded in 1865 by the Roman Catholic Bishop of Ardagh and Clonmacnois as a diocesan seminary to train students for the priesthood. While the school only briefly functioned as a seminary, it served for most of the 20th century as a boarding school while also admitting day students. The boarding school was discontinued in 2002.

In December 2024, plans were announced to merge St. Mel's College and Scoil Mhuire, to form a co-educational school to be known as Coláiste Mel agus Mhuire.

== Transport ==
=== Road ===
Longford is at the point of divergence of the N5 road to Castlebar/Westport/Ireland West Airport and the N4 road which continues onwards to Sligo.

The N5 originally started in the town centre, causing occasional traffic congestion. The town's bypass opened on 3 August 2012.

The N4 Sligo road has a bypass around the town, which consists of single carriageway with hard shoulders and four roundabouts. It was opened on 2 June 1995.

The N4 Mullingar to Longford (Roosky) project is a road improvement scheme which aims to upgrade a 52 km single carriagway section of the N4 between bypasses at Mullingar and Roosky. The project includes plans for a new bypass of Longford, with construction anticipated to commence by 2030.

=== Rail ===
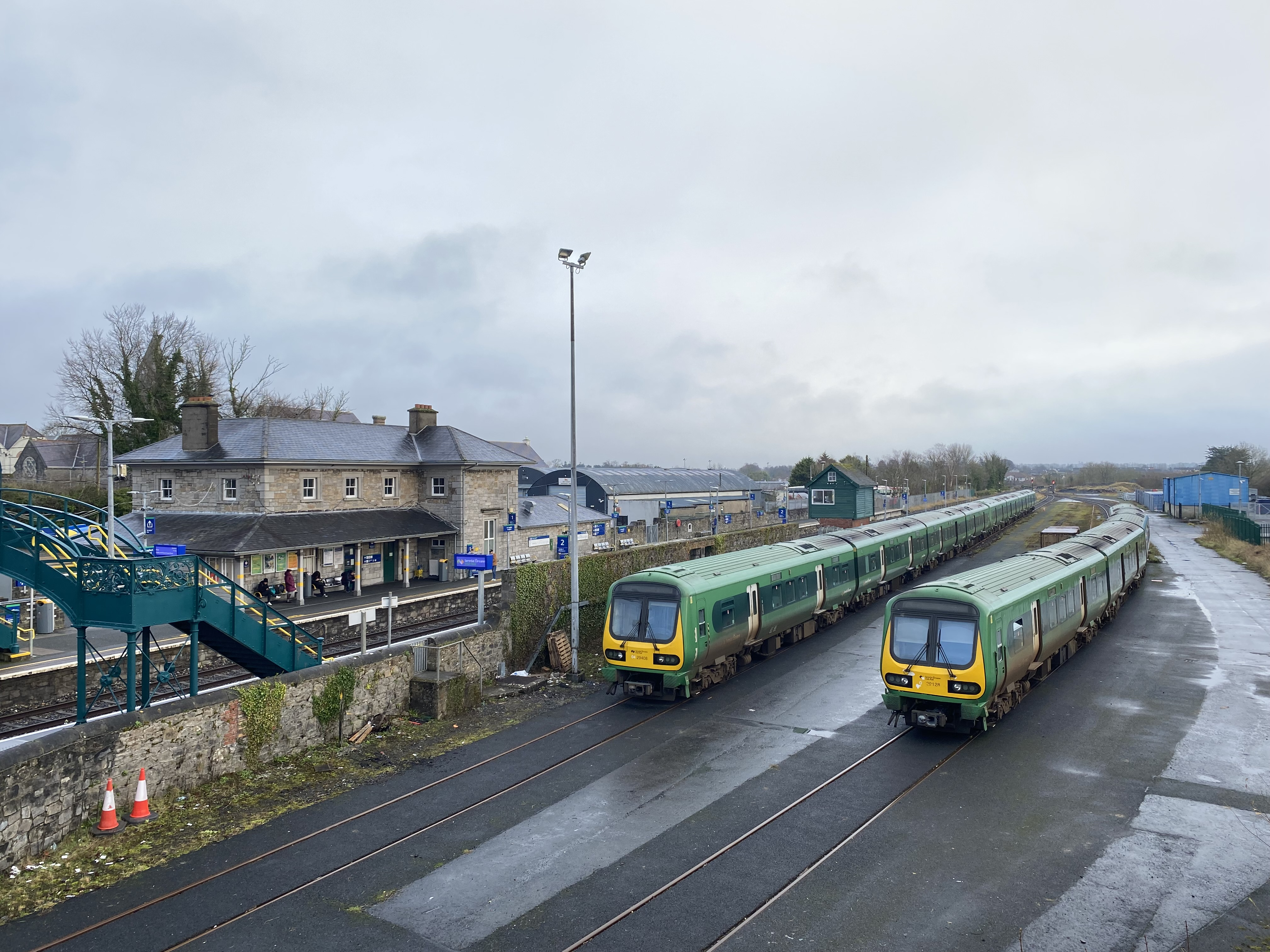
Longford railway station

Longford railway station (opened 8 November 1855) is on the Dublin-Sligo line of the Irish railway network. About 91 kilometres (57 mi) from Sligo and 122 km (76 mi) from Dublin, it is served by Sligo-Dublin intercity services. Despite its distance from Dublin, there is a regular, well-utilised commuter service to Dublin with journeys to Dublin Connolly generally taking about an hour and three-quarters.

=== Canals ===
The Royal Canal Greenway is a 130 km greenway which spans along the Royal Canal between Maynooth and Cloondara, with a branch to Longford. It was launched in March 2021 following the reopening of the canal to navigation in 2010.

=== Bus ===
Bus Éireann operates several bus routes which serve the town. These include Expressway routes 22 and 23 (Ballina and Sligo to Dublin respectively). Other services include routes 65 (Galway to Cavan), 73 (Waterford to Athlone), 425/425A (from Galway), 451 (from Ballina via Charlestown), 466 (Athlone to Cavan via Ballymahon and Longford), 467 (from Roscommon via Lanesboro), and 469 (from Sligo). A prior service, route 463 to Carrigallen, was discontinued in December 2025 and was replaced with a TFI Local Link service.

There are a number of bus services provided by private bus companies which serve the town. These include Kane Coaches, Donnelly's Coaches and Farrelly's Coaches. Donnelly's Pioneer Bus Service, based in Granard, operate a route from Longford to Granard via Ballinalee. There are three journeys each way daily with no Sunday service. Farrelly's Coaches operate a route from Longford to Athlone during the academic year, serving Technological University of the Shannon.

Whartons Travel, which is also a local bus service, operate a route from Longford railway station and Longford to Cavan via Drumlish, Arvagh and Crossdoney. As of 2014, this service is funded by the National Transport Authority.

=== Air ===
Longford's main air transport centre is located south-east of the town, at Abbeyshrule. Abbeyshrule Aerodrome receives a regular influx of small general aviation aircraft, including the Cessna 182 and 150. The airport also has two flight training organisations; one for general aviation fixed wing aircraft training (Aeroclub 2000) and one for microlight aircraft flight training (Skyline Flying Club).

== Arts and culture ==
The Backstage Theatre and Centre for the Arts is a facility for arts and culture projects in the town and surrounding areas. It is funded by Longford County Council with support from the Arts Council. Backstage is a member of two arts touring networks: Nasc a nationwide network of seven venues and Nomad a north midlands based network.

== Sport ==
The town has a number of sports clubs and facilities, including the Gaelic Athletic Association, a League of Ireland soccer club (Longford Town FC), rugby and tennis clubs, a swimming pool, a gym and an 18-hole golf course.

=== Gaelic football and hurling ===
The headquarters of Longford GAA are located in Pearse Park in the town, with a ground capacity of around 10,000. The Longford Gaelic football team won a Leinster title at Senior level and a National League title in 1966 and 1968 respectively. The minor (under-18) Longford county team won the Leinster title in 2002 and 2010. The major boys' secondary school in Longford town, St. Mel's College, also has a tradition in secondary schools' football (known as Colleges A), winning 29 Leinster and 4 All-Ireland titles (in the Hogan Cup). The main local GAA club is Longford Slashers, based in Longford town, who have won more Longford Senior Football Championship titles (16) than any other team in the county, including a win in 2013.

=== Association football ===
Longford town's main association football (soccer) club, Longford Town FC, was founded in 1924 and was elected to the League of Ireland in 1984. The club's ground is at Strokestown Road. Longford Town FC has twice won the FAI Cup, in 2003 and 2004.

=== Other sports ===
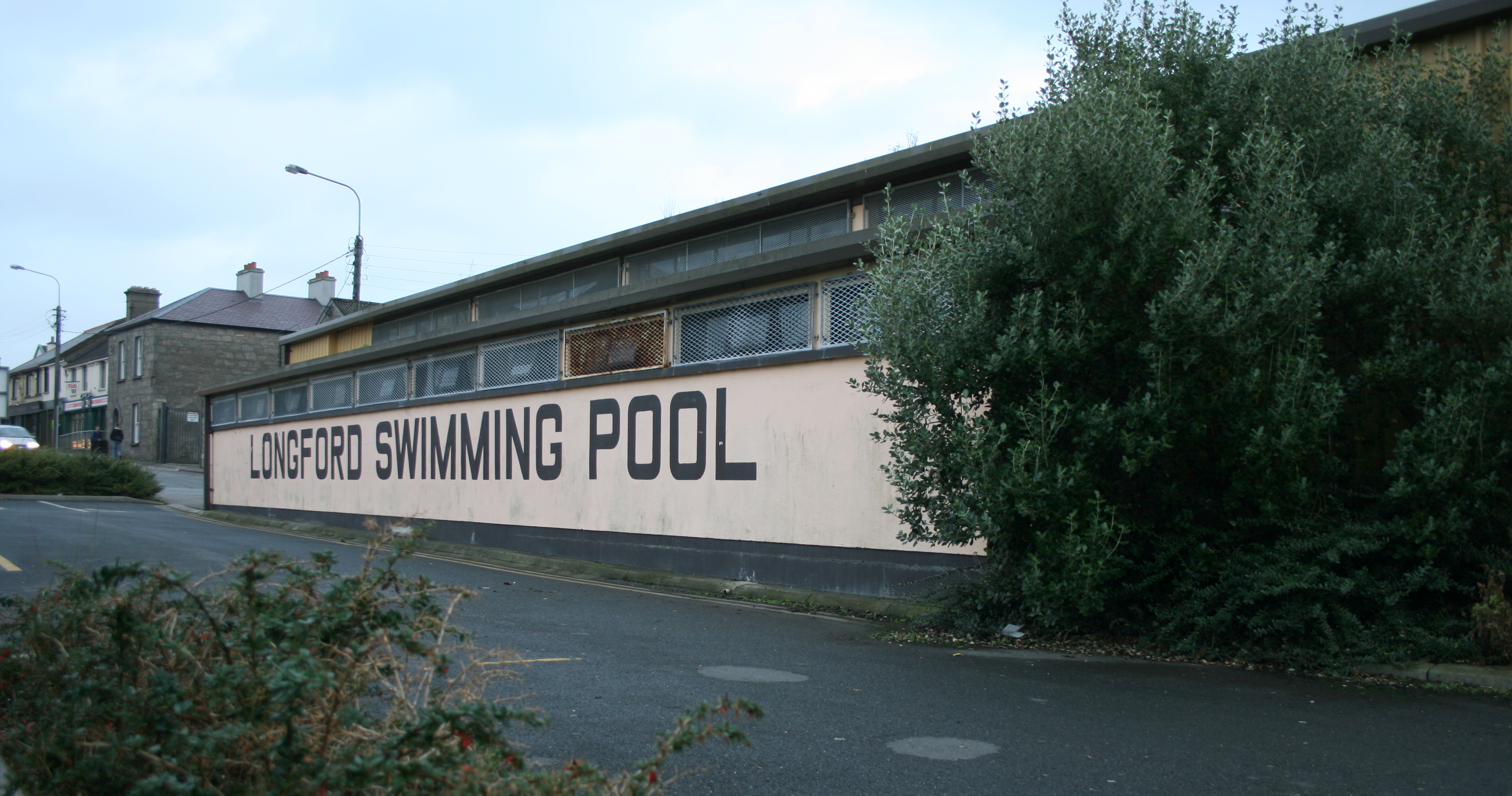
Longford Swimming Pool in 2007

The local rugby union club, Longford RFC, was formed in the 1960s and participates in the Leinster League.

Longford Tennis Club was established in the 19th century. Facilities include five outdoor tennis courts and floodlights. A redeveloped clubhouse was opened in 1993.

A swimming pool at the Market Square in Longford was opened in 1966. The pool served the town until its closure in 2007, and was demolished in 2013.

Longford Sports & Leisure Centre and a new swimming pool were completed by 2008. The centre is located in an area known locally as The Mall. Other amenities include a gym, and indoor and outdoor football and basketball facilities. A gym extension was opened in 2020.

County Longford Golf Club was established in 1894 and is home to an 18-hole golf course.

== People ==
- Willie Browne (1936–2004), Republic of Ireland international footballer
- Francis "Frank" Butler (1847–1926), rifleshot who toured the US (1876–1884) and husband-manager of American sharpshooter Annie Oakley
- Padraic Colum (1881–1972), Irish poet, novelist and playwright
- Ray Flynn (b.1957), Irish mile record holder
- Gareth Ghee, inter-county hurler
- Michael Gomez (b.1977), champion professional boxer was born in an Irish Traveller family in Longford
- Brandon Ly (b.2005), Irish-Vietnamese footballer
- Patrick McCabe (b.1955), novelist, has lived in Longford
- Ruairí Ó Brádaigh (1932–2013), founder of Republican Sinn Féin

== Climate ==
Climate in this area has mild differences between highs and lows, and there is adequate rainfall year-round. The Köppen Climate Classification subtype for this climate is "Cfb" (Marine West Coast Climate/Oceanic climate).

Climate data for Longford
Month	Jan	Feb	Mar	Apr	May	Jun	Jul	Aug	Sep	Oct	Nov	Dec	Year
Mean maximum °C (°F)	12.3 (54.1)	13.4 (56.1)	16.7 (62.1)	19.3 (66.7)	22.9 (73.2)	24.8 (76.6)	25.2 (77.4)	24.9 (76.8)	22.1 (71.8)	19.0 (66.2)	15.6 (60.1)	12.8 (55.0)	19.1 (66.4)
Mean daily maximum °C (°F)	7.6 (45.7)	8.4 (47.1)	10.3 (50.5)	13.2 (55.8)	16.3 (61.3)	18.1 (64.6)	20.4 (68.7)	19.3 (66.7)	17.1 (62.8)	13.6 (56.5)	9.4 (48.9)	7.8 (46.0)	13.5 (56.2)
Daily mean °C (°F)	4.7 (40.5)	5.3 (41.5)	6.8 (44.2)	9.4 (48.9)	11.7 (53.1)	13.8 (56.8)	16.2 (61.2)	15.5 (59.9)	13.2 (55.8)	10.1 (50.2)	6.4 (43.5)	4.8 (40.6)	9.8 (49.7)
Mean daily minimum °C (°F)	1.7 (35.1)	2.1 (35.8)	3.3 (37.9)	5.6 (42.1)	7.1 (44.8)	9.5 (49.1)	12.1 (53.8)	11.3 (52.3)	9.3 (48.7)	6.6 (43.9)	3.4 (38.1)	1.8 (35.2)	6.1 (43.1)
Mean minimum °C (°F)	−2.1 (28.2)	−1.3 (29.7)	0.3 (32.5)	2.6 (36.7)	5.6 (42.1)	7.6 (45.7)	10.5 (50.9)	9.7 (49.5)	7.8 (46.0)	4.8 (40.6)	1.2 (34.2)	−1.9 (28.6)	3.9 (39.0)
Average precipitation mm (inches)	78.8 (3.10)	58.6 (2.31)	67.4 (2.65)	55.0 (2.17)	59.5 (2.34)	66.5 (2.62)	59.4 (2.34)	81.6 (3.21)	66.4 (2.61)	94.2 (3.71)	74.7 (2.94)	83.8 (3.30)	845.7 (33.30)
Source: Weatherbase

== International relations ==
Longford is twinned with Noyal-Châtillon-sur-Seiche in France, Huixquilucan in Mexico and Sparks, Nevada in the United States.

== See also ==
- Carn Clonhugh
- List of towns and villages in Ireland

== Sources ==
- Clarke, Peter (17 February 1993). "The Royal Canal 1789-1993". Dublin Historical Record. 46 (1). Dublin: Old Dublin Society: 46–52. JSTOR 30101021.
