= Con Murphy (Valley Rovers hurler) =

Irish hurler

Personal information
- Native name: Conchur Ó Murchú (Irish)
- Born: 28 October 1922 Innishannon, County Cork, Ireland
- Died: 29 April 2007 (aged 84) South Douglas Road, Cork, Ireland
- Occupation: Health board employee
- Height: 5 ft 10 in (178 cm)

Sport
- Sport: Hurling
- Position: Full-back
Clubs
- Years: Club
- 1936–1956: Valley Rovers → Carrigdhoun
Club titles
- Cork titles: 0
Inter-county
Years	County	Apps (scores)
1942–1951	Cork	27 (0-00)
Inter-county titles
- Munster titles: 5
- All-Irelands: 4
- NHL: 1

Cornelius "Con" Murphy (28 October 1922 – 29 April 2007) was an Irish hurler who played as a full-back at senior level for the Cork county team.

Murphy joined the team during the 1942 championship and was a regular member of the starting fifteen until his retirement after the 1951 championship. During that time, he won four All-Ireland medals, five Munster medals, and one National League medal. Murphy was an All-Ireland runner-up on one occasion.

At club level Murphy had a lengthy career with Valley Rovers while he also played with divisional side Carrigdhoun.

Once retired from playing, Murphy became a referee at the highest levels. He also served as a Gaelic games administrator with the Cork County Board before assuming the office of President of the Gaelic Athletic Association in 1976.

== Playing career ==
=== Colleges ===
Murphy first found success on the hurling field during his studies at the North Monastery in Cork. In 1940 he joined the college's senior hurling team and won a Dr Harty Cup medal that year following a defeat of Limerick CBS. It was the first of three successive Munster medals for Murphy.

=== Club ===
Murphy was still a junior when he joined Valley Rovers, playing both hurling and gaelic football. In 1937, the Rovers won 4–3 to 2–0 over Carrigaline (hurling) and a 1–1 to 0–2 win over Kinsale (gaelic football) yielding Murphy junior divisional hurling and football medals in both sports.

Four years later in 1941 Murphy won a second divisional junior hurling medal as Valley Rovers defeated Tracton by 5–7 to 5–3, followed up by a second divisional junior football medal in 1943 when Rovers beat Tracton.

In 1945, Murphy played on the Carrigdhoun divisional team that reached the final of the senior hurling championship, who were beaten by Glen Rovers 4–10 to 5–3.

The highlight of Murphy's career brought further success at divisional level. He won a third divisional junior hurling medal in 1949. He also gained two more divisional junior football medals in 1947 and 1951.

=== Inter-county ===
Murphy joined the Cork senior hurling team at a time of great success for the club. He made his senior championship debut in 1942 and collected his first Munster medal as Tipperary were downed by 4–15 to 4–1. The All-Ireland final was a replay of the previous year with Dublin providing the opposition once again. The game was a close affair with just a point separating the sides at the three-quarter stage. In the end Cork won by 2–14 to 3–4 and Murphy collected an All-Ireland medal.

A 2–13 to 3–8 defeat of Waterford in 1943 gave Murphy a second Munster medal. He later lined out in a second All-Ireland decider with Antrim becoming the first Ulster side to qualify for a final. A final score of 5–16 to 0–4 gave Cork their second-ever hat-trick of All-Ireland titles while it also gave Murphy a second All-Ireland medal.

In 1944 Cork were attempting to capture a fourth All-Ireland title in-a-row. No team in the history of the hurling championship had won more than three consecutive titles. The year started well for the team when Cork defeated Limerick by 4–6 to 3–6 after a replay, awarding Murphy a third Munster medal. For the third time in four years Cork faced Dublin in an All-Ireland decider. Joe Kelly was the hero of the day and he contributed greatly to Cork's 2–13 to 1–2 victory. It was a third successive All-Ireland medal for Murphy.

Five-in-a-row proved to be a bridge too far for Cork, however, the team returned in 1946. A 3–8 to 1–3 defeat of Limerick gave Murphy his fourth Munster medal. Under the captaincy of Christy Ring, Cork subsequently faced old rivals Kilkenny in the All-Ireland final. While some had written off Cork's chances, they took an interval lead of four points. When ten minutes remained Cork's lead was reduced to just two points, however, goals by Mossy O'Riordan and Joe Kelly secured the victory. A 7–6 to 3–8 score line gave Murphy a fourth and final All-Ireland medal.

Cork retained their provincial dominance in 1947 with Murphy picking up a fifth winners' medal following a three-point victory over Limerick. The All-Ireland final was a repeat of the previous year with Kilkenny providing the opposition. The stakes were high for both sides as Cork were aiming for a record sixth championship in seven seasons while Kilkenny were aiming to avoid becoming the first team to lose three consecutive All-Ireland finals. In what has been described as one of the greatest deciders of all-time, little separated the two teams over the course if the hour. A Joe Kelly goal put Cork one point ahead with time almost up, however, Terry Leahy proved to be the hero of the day. He converted a free to level the sides again before sending over the match-winner from the subsequent puck-out. With that the game was over and Murphy's side were beaten by 0–14 to 2–7. It was the fifth time that Kilkenny had pipped Cork by a single point in an All-Ireland final.

Murphy won a National Hurling League medal at the start of 1948 following a 3–3 to 1–2 defeat of Tipperary. Cork later faced an on-point defeat by Waterford in the provincial decider.

That defeat saw the break-up of the great four-in-a-row team of the 1940s and was followed by four lean years of championship hurling for Cork. After three consecutive defeats by Tipperary in 1949, 1950 and 1951, Murphy retired from inter-county hurling in 1951.

=== Inter-provincial ===
Murphy was selected for Munster in the inter-provincial series of games. He made his debut with the province in 1944 and was a regular until his retirement in 1950.

Murphy's first Railway Cup medal was secured as an unused substitute in 1944 when Munster defeated Connacht by 4–10 to 4–4.

Four years later in 1948 Murphy was a member of the starting fifteen as Munster returned to the final. A 3–5 to 2–5 defeat of Leinster gave Murphy his second Railway Cup medal, his first on the field of play. It was the first of three-in-a-row for Munster as subsequent defeats of Connacht and Leinster brought Murphy's medal tally to four.

== Post-playing career ==
=== Refereeing career ===
As his playing career drew to a close Murphy began his career as a referee. He was still a player with the Cork senior team when he was charged with officiating at the National League final in 1947. The following year Murphy took charge of his first All-Ireland senior decider when Waterford won their inaugural title. 1949 saw him referee the Munster final, having played in the earlier rounds of the championship, as well as the All-Ireland junior final. The following year Murphy was the man-in-the-middle for the All-Ireland senior final once again as Tipperary took their second consecutive title. In 1952 he again refereed for the National League final.

Murphy was also a popular referee on the local club scene around Munster. He took charge of numerous club championship deciders in Cork and Tipperary.

=== Cork County Board ===
Murphy was still a teenager when he became involved in the administrative affairs of the Gaelic Athletic Association. He represented Valley Rovers at the Carrigdhoun convention and in 1948 was elected chairman of that body at just twenty-six years of age. Murphy went on to represent Carrigdhoun at county board level, and became a member of the Cork County Board executive in 1947.

In the early 1950s Murphy held the positions of vice-chairman and Treasurer. In 1956, following the death of Seán Óg Murphy, he took over as Secretary of the County Board. He held this position until 1973. In the mid-1980s Murphy returned as Chairman of the Cork County Board.

In 2005 Murphy was a delegate at the GAA's annual congress when the controversial Rule 42 was debated. Murphy was one of the most vocal opponents and campaigned to keep Croke Park closed to soccer and rugby.

=== President of the GAA ===
In 1976 Murphy became President of the Gaelic Athletic Association, a role which he held until 1978. During his three-year term as President there were many significant developments, such as the official opening of the 50,000-seat Páirc Uí Chaoimh in Cork in 1976, which he played a big part in the construction of. He also campaigned to the British government on the behalf of Crossmaglen Rangers, whose pitch had been occupied by the British army. During his tenure as President Murphy also had the privilege of presenting the Liam MacCarthy Cup to three different Cork men in succession as Cork completed a famous three-in-a-row of All-Ireland hurling victories.

== Personal life ==
Born in Toureen, a few miles on the Cork side of Innishannon, Murphy was the eldest of seven children, four boys and three girls. From an early age he took a great interest in Gaelic games, particularly since his uncle Seán McCarthy, his mother's brother, was GAA president from 1932 to 1935.

Murphy was educated at the local national school and later attended the North Monastery in Cork. He later joined the Southern Health Board and served in various grades and positions until he retired from the position of Senior Executive Officer in 1983. After this he started a private business which he operated successfully until his retirement in 1998. Murphy was also named as a member of the RTÉ Authority and in 1995 he was made a Freeman of the City of Cork.

Murphy died at St. Finbarr's Hospital, Cork on 29 April 2007.

Achievements
Preceded by Phil Purcell; M.J. "Inky" Flaherty	All-Ireland SHC Final referee 1948; 1950	Succeeded by M. J. "Inky" Flaherty; Willie O'Donoghue
Sporting positions
Preceded by Andy Scannell	Vice-Chairman of the Cork County Board; 1952–1953	Succeeded by Jack Barrett
Preceded by Séamus Long	Treasurer of the Cork County Board; 1954–1956	Succeeded by Paddy O'Driscoll
Preceded by Seán Óg Murphy	Secretary of the Cork County Board; 1957–1972	Succeeded by Frank Murphy
Preceded by Donal Keenan	President of the Gaelic Athletic Association; 1976–1979	Succeeded by Pádraig Mac Floinn
Preceded by Derry Gowen	Chairman of the Cork County Board; 1985–1987	Succeeded by Denis Conroy
