= Thomas Loftus =

Thomas P. Loftus

Personal information
- Native name: Tomás Ó Lochtuis (Irish)
- Nickname: Tom
- Born: 29 June 1917 County Roscommon, Ireland
- Died: 5 March 2011 (aged 93)

Sport

Tom Loftus (1917–2011; Irish: Tomás Ó Lochtuis) was a former chairman of the Leinster Provincial Council of the Gaelic Athletic Association (GAA).

== Biography ==
Tom Loftus was born in Roscommon town, County Roscommon in 1917. His grandmother ran a dispensary and his father was a journalist with the Roscommon Herald. Loftus moved to Dublin in 1937 and married Ann Mooney in 1951. For most of his life he worked at the Electricity Supply Board (ESB) in the city.

== Career ==
Loftus was chairman of the Leinster Council from 1972–1974, was chairman of the Dublin County Board and was a longstanding member of the organisation. He stood twice for the position of president of the GAA, but was twice pipped at the post, once by his namesake Dr. Mick Loftus.

During his period as Dublin Chairman, the team won the All-Ireland Senior Football Championship. In 1964, became the first chairman to bring his team to the United States, to raise awareness of the GAA in America.

In 1965, Loftus was a member of the first GAA committee to examine Rule 27, which prevented members from playing, attending or promoting other sports. The rule was originally passed in 1902 and was intended as a way of safeguarding the GAA from the influence of non-gaelic sports, but ultimately resulted in the untimely demise of several promising careers within the organisation. The rule read "Any member of the association who plays or encourages in any way rugby, football, hockey or any imported game which is calculated to injuriously affect our national pastimes, is suspended from the association." The first GAA committee failed to make any recommendations and it wasn't until 1971 that the ban was removed from the rulebooks.

Tom was also well known in Dublin for his weekly column in the Evening Press which he wrote throughout the 1960s and 1970s.

Tom retired from his post in the ESB in 1977 and quickly became an advocate of junior level GAA, organising and coaching teams in County Wicklow, particularly Bray Emmets and Kilmacud Crokes.

After his retirement, Tom received numerous awards and recognitions of his contribution to the organisation. Until his death in 2011, he was the oldest living former chairman in the Gaelic Athletic Association

== Successes ==
- 1963 Dublin won the All Ireland Football Final against Galway

Team: P. Flynn, L. Hickey, L. Foley, W. Casey, D. McKane, P. Holden, M. Kissane, D. Foley, John Timmons, B. McDonald, M. Whelan, G. Davey, S. Behan, D. Ferguson, N. Fox. Sub: P. Downey.

- 1965 Dublin won the Leinster Senior Football Championship against Longford

== Chairmanships ==
Preceded by unknown	Chairman of the GAA Dublin County Board; 1960–1968	Succeeded by unknown
Preceded by unknown	Vice Chairman of the GAA Leinster Council; 1969–1972	Succeeded by unknown
Preceded by Jack Conroy	Chairman of the GAA Leinster Council; 1972–1974	Succeeded by Jimmy Roche
