= Antrim–Cork hurling rivalry =

Antrim-Cork
- Location: County Antrim; County Cork
- Teams: Antrim; Cork
- First meeting: 6 May 1906; Cork 8-11 - 2-3 Antrim; 1904 All-Ireland semi-final
- Latest meeting: 11 June 2022; Cork 3-27 - 2-19 Antrim; 2022 All-Ireland preliminary quarter-finals
- Next meeting: TBA

Statistics
- Total meetings: 9
- Top scorer: Seán Condon (3-8)
- All-time series: Cork 9-0 Antrim
- Largest victory: 5 September 1943; Cork 5-16 - 0-4 Antrim; 1943 All-Ireland final

The Antrim-Cork rivalry is a hurling rivalry between Irish county teams Antrim and Cork, who first played each other in 1906. The fixture has been an irregular one due to both teams playing in separate provinces. Antrim's home ground is Casement Park and Cork's home ground is Páirc Uí Chaoimh, however, all of their championship meetings have been held at a neutral venue, usually Croke Park.

While Cork are regarded as one of the "big three" of hurling, with Tipperary and Kilkenny completing the trio, Antrim have never claimed the All-Ireland title following just two appearances in the final.

As of 2014 Antrim and Cork have met eight times in the hurling championship with Cork emerging successful on all eight occasions.

== History ==
=== 1943: All-Ireland final meeting ===
After two shock victories over Galway and Kilkenny, Antrim made history by becoming the first Ulster representatives to line out in an All-Ireland final against Cork on 5 September 1943. The harsh economic realities of the Emergency were recognised before the throw-in as team captains Mick Kennefick and Jimmy Walsh made an exchange of tea and butter. But that was as good as it got for Antrim, as they froze on a day when Cork caught fire. Cork led by 3-11 to 0-2 at the break and by 5-16 to 0-4 at the end. The Rebels had their second three-in-a-row.

=== 2004-2010: Cork continue to dominate ===
After a fourteen-year hiatus, Antrim and Cork renewed their rivalry on 25 July 2004. Antrim manager Dinny Cahill made some strong comments in the media prior to the game in which he criticised Cork players Brian Corcoran, Niall McCarthy, Tom Kenny and Jerry O'Connor. Right from the throw-in the Cork tempo was furious. Corcoran goaled twice for Cork to give them a commanding 2-13 to 0-3 interval lead. Antrim came close to scoring a goal when a Liam Watson-struck free hit the bottom of the upright in the 60th minute at a time when Cork had extended their lead to sixteen points before eventually winning by 2-20 to 0-10.

Antrim and Cork had their most recent championship clash on 25 July 2010 in an All-Ireland quarter-final. Cork’s opening eight points all came from frees, and by the 25th minute, they had moved into an 0-11 to 0-6 lead. Antrim battled bravely, however, gaps started to open up in the Antrim defence late in the half, allowing Tom Kenny and Kieran Murphy to take advantage and add points. It was in the 35th minute that Aisake Ó hAilpín slipped the ball to Niall McCarthy, and he found the net from close range. Ben O'Connor tagged on a couple of frees, and the Rebels went in at the break with a 1-16 to 0-11 lead. The Saffrons narrowed the gap after the interval through Liam Watson and Neil McManus, however, they finished with fourteen men after Watson was sent off for a second booking, and Cork finished the job with a late salvo of scores to secure a 1-25 to 0-19 victory.

== Statistics ==
Up to date as of 2023 season

Team	All-Ireland	Provincial	National League	Total
Cork	30	54	14	98
Antrim	0	58	0	58
Combined	30	112	14	156

== All-time results ==
=== Legend ===
Cork win
Antrim win

=== Senior ===
No.	Date	Winners	Score	Runners-up	Venue	Competition
1.	6 May 1906	Cork (1)	4-18 - 2-3	Antrim	Jones's Road	All-Ireland semi-final
2.	5 September 1943	Cork (2)	5-16 - 0-4	Antrim	Croke Park	All-Ireland final
3.	3 August 1947	Cork (3)	7-10 - 0-5	Antrim	Croke Park	All-Ireland semi-final
4.	5 August 1984	Cork (4)	3-26 - 2-5	Antrim	Croke Park	All-Ireland semi-final
5.	10 August 1986	Cork (5)	7-11 - 1-24	Antrim	Croke Park	All-Ireland semi-final
6.	5 August 1990	Cork (6)	2-20 - 1-13	Antrim	Croke Park	All-Ireland semi-final
7.	25 July 2004	Cork (7)	2-26 - 0-10	Antrim	Croke Park	All-Ireland quarter-final
8.	25 July 2010	Cork (8)	1-25 - 0-19	Antrim	Croke Park	All-Ireland quarter-final
9.	11 June 2022	Cork (9)	3-27 - 2-19	Antrim	Corrigan Park	All-Ireland preliminary quarter-final

=== Intermediate ===
No.	Date	Winners	Score	Runners-up	Venue	Competition
1.	27 August 1967	Cork (1)	4-6 - 2-6	Antrim	Cork Athletic Grounds	All-Ireland semi-final
2.	31 August 1969	Cork (2)	4-16 - 4-5	Antrim	Cork Athletic Grounds	All-Ireland semi-final
3.	22 August 2004	Cork (3)	5-9 - 2-11	Antrim	Parnell Park	All-Ireland semi-final

=== Junior ===
No.	Date	Winners	Score	Runners-up	Venue	Competition
1.	22 September 1929	Cork (1)	3-8 - 1-1	Antrim	Croke Park	All-Ireland semi-final
2.	9 October 1938	Cork (2)	6-5 - 2-4	Antrim	Croke Park	All-Ireland home final
3.	27 August 1950	Cork (3)	7-1 - 3-2	Antrim	Cork Athletic Grounds	All-Ireland semi-final
4.	28 August 1955	Cork (4)	4-9 - 3-6	Antrim	Casement Park	All-Ireland semi-final
5.	14 September 1958	Cork (5)	3-11 - 3-5	Antrim	Croke Park	All-Ireland semi-final
6.	20 September 1959	Antrim (1)	3-4 - 2-3	Cork	Croke Park	All-Ireland home final

=== Under-21 ===
No.	Date	Winners	Score	Runners-up	Venue	Competition
1.	18 August 1968	Cork (1)	4-17 - 2-4	Antrim	Páirc Mac Uílín	All-Ireland semi-final
2.	9 August 1970	Cork (2)	3-10 - 1-4	Antrim	Casement Park	All-Ireland semi-final
3.	1 August 1982	Cork (3)	4-21 - 1-10	Antrim	Páirc Tailteann	All-Ireland semi-final
4.	21 August 1988	Cork (4)	4-21 - 1-3	Antrim	Croke Park	All-Ireland semi-final
5.	6 September 1998	Cork (5)	3-15 - 0-11	Antrim	Parnell Park	All-Ireland semi-final

=== Minor ===
No.	Date	Winners	Score	Runners-up	Venue	Competition
1.	29 August 1937	Cork (1)	6-3 - 0-2	Antrim	MacRory Park	All-Ireland semi-final
2.	20 August 1939	Cork (2)	9-8 - 1-1	Antrim	Croke Park	All-Ireland semi-final
3.	7 September 1941	Cork (3)	13-8 - 1-2	Antrim	Croke Park	All-Ireland semi-final
4.	12 August 1951	Cork (4)	10-8 - 3-1	Antrim	Croke Park	All-Ireland semi-final
5.	16 August 1964	Cork (5)	7-9 - 2-4	Antrim	Croke Park	All-Ireland semi-final
6.	14 August 1966	Cork (6)	9-11 - 1-6	Antrim	Cork Athletic Grounds	All-Ireland semi-final

== Top scorers ==
Rank	Player	Team	Score	Total	Appearances
1.	Seán Condon	Cork	3-8	17	1943, 1947
2.	John Fenton	Cork	0-12	12	1984, 1986
3.	Jimmy Barry-Murphy	Cork	3-2	11	1984, 1986
