= Larry Fanning =

Irish hurler

Personal information
- Native name: Labhrás Ó Fainín (Irish)
- Born: 1922 Waterford, Ireland
- Died: 28 August 2008 (aged 86) Waterford, Ireland

Sport
- Sport: Hurling
- Position: Full back
Club
- Years: Club
- Mount Sion
Club titles
| | Football | Hurling |
| Wexford titles | 3 | 9 |
Inter-county
- Years: County
- 1948–1951: Waterford
Inter-county titles
- Leinster titles: 1
- All-Irelands: 0
- NHL: 0

Larry Fanning (1922 – 28 August 2008) was an Irish hurler who played as a full-back for the Waterford senior team.

Born in Waterford, Fanning first played competitive hurling during his schooling at Mount Sion CBS. He arrived on the inter-county scene at a time when Waterford's senior hurling fortunes were about to change. During his career he won a one All-Ireland medal as a non-playing substitute and one Munster medal on the field of play.

At club level Fanning was a nine-time championship medallist with Mount Sion. He also won three championship medals in Gaelic football.

His retirement came following Waterford's defeat by Tipperary in the 1954 championship.

Fanning's brother, Pat, served as president of the Gaelic Athletic Association.

== Honours ==
=== Team ===
Mount Sion

- Waterford Senior Hurling Championship (9): 1943, 1945, 1948, 1949, 1951, 1953, 1954, 1955, 1956 (c)
- Waterford Senior Football Championship (3): 1953, 1955, 1956

Waterford

- All-Ireland Senior Hurling Championship (1): 1948 (sub)
- Munster Senior Hurling Championship (1): 1948
