= Paddy McFlynn =

Irish Gaelic sports player and administrator

Patrick Joseph McFlynn (Irish: Padraig MacFloinn; 9 May 1918 – 24 September 2013) was an Irish sports administrator who served as the 26th president of the Gaelic Athletic Association.

Born in Magherafelt, McFlynn was a founder member of the O'Donovan Rossa club in Magherafelt and went on to become Derry county secretary in 1940 at the age of 23. He won a Senior County Championship medal with his club in 1942.

When he moved to Down because of his teaching job, his club was Tullylish.

He died in September 2013 at the age of 95.

Sporting positions
Preceded by Con Murphy	President of the Gaelic Athletic Association; 1979–1982	Succeeded by Paddy Buggy
