= Leinster GAA =

Provincial council of the Gaelic Athletic Association

- Irish: Laighin
- Number of counties: 12
- Province colours: Green White
- Major grounds: UPMC Nowlan Park; Laois Hire O'Moore Park; Netwatch Cullen Park; Glenisk O'Connor Park

Most All-Ireland titles
- Hurling: Kilkenny (36)
- Football: Dublin (31)

Most provincial titles
- Hurling: Kilkenny (77)
- Football: Dublin (64)

Interprovincial Championship wins
- Hurling: 28
- Football: 28

Standard kit
- Regular kit

The Leinster Council is a provincial council of the Gaelic Athletic Association sports of hurling, Gaelic football, camogie, rounders and handball in the province of Leinster.

As of 2008, there were 834 clubs affiliated to the county boards of the Leinster Council.

== County boards ==
- Carlow
- Dublin
- Kildare
- Kilkenny
- Laois
- Longford
- Louth
- Meath
- Offaly
- Westmeath
- Wexford
- Wicklow

== Football ==
=== Provincial team ===
The Leinster provincial football team represents the province of Leinster in Gaelic football. The team competes in the Railway Cup.

==== Players ====
Players from the following county teams represent Leinster: Carlow, Dublin, Kildare, Kilkenny, Laois, Longford, Louth, Offaly, Westmeath, Wexford and Wicklow.

=== Competitions ===
==== Inter-county ====
- Leinster Senior Football Championship
- O'Byrne Cup
- Leinster Junior Football Championship
- Leinster Under-20 Football Championship
- Leinster Minor Football Championship

Dublin heads the roll of honor in football, having won 60 Leinster Senior Football Championship titles as of 2025.

==== Club ====
- Leinster Senior Club Football Championship
- Leinster Intermediate Club Football Championship
- Leinster Junior Club Football Championship
- Leinster Minor Club Football Championship

== Hurling ==
=== Provincial team ===
The Leinster provincial hurling team represents the province of Leinster in hurling. The team competes in the Railway Cup.

=== Competitions ===
==== Inter-county ====
- Leinster Senior Hurling Championship
- Walsh Cup
- Kehoe Cup
- Leinster Intermediate Hurling Championship
- Leinster Junior Hurling Championship
- Leinster Under-20 Hurling Championship
- Leinster Minor Hurling Championship

Kilkenny is the most successful county hurling team at senior level in the province, having won the Leinster Senior Hurling Championship on 74 occasions as of 2022.

==== Club ====
- Leinster Senior Club Hurling Championship
- Leinster Intermediate Club Hurling Championship
- Leinster Junior Club Hurling Championship

==== Grades ====
Championship	County team
Senior
Leinster SHC	Dublin
Leinster SHC	Kildare
Leinster SHC	Kilkenny
Leinster SHC	Offaly
Leinster SHC	Wexford
Senior B
Joe McDonagh Cup	Carlow
Joe McDonagh Cup	Laois
Joe McDonagh Cup	Westmeath
Intermediate
Christy Ring Cup	Meath
Christy Ring Cup	Wicklow
Junior
Nicky Rackard Cup	Louth
Junior B
Lory Meagher Cup	Longford

== Camogie ==
=== Gael Linn Cup ===
The Leinster camogie team won the premier representative competition in the women's team field sport of camogie, the Gael Linn Cup on 26 occasions in 1956, 1957, 1958, 1959, 1960, 1962, 1965, 1968, 1969, 1970, 1971, 1972, 1978, 1979, 1981, 1983, 1984, 1985, 1986, 1987, 1988, 1989, 1991, 1993, 2006 and 2010.

=== Gael Linn Trophy ===
The Leinster provincial junior camogie team won the Gael Linn Trophy on seven occasions in 1976, 1982, 1984, 1986, 1999, 2001 and 2007.

== County Honours ==
Rank	Team	Football		Hurling		Total		Most recent Provincial	
Rank	Team	Title(s)	Runners-up	Title(s)	Runners-up	Title(s)	Runners-up	Title	Runner-up
1	Dublin	63	23	24	37	87	60	2024	2026
2	Kilkenny	3	5	77	29	80	34	2025	2026
3	Wexford	10	16	21	32	31	48	2019	2017
4	Meath	21	22	-	-	21	22	2010	2025
5	Offaly	10	9	9	14	19	23	1997	2006
6	Kildare	13	24	-	-	13	24	2000	2022
7	Laois	6	15	3	11	9	26	2003	2018
8	Louth	9	14	-	-	9	14	2025	2024
9	Westmeath	2	4	-	1	2	5	2026	2016
9	Carlow	1	2	-	-	1	2	1944	1942
9	Longford	1	1	-	-	1	1	1968	1965
12	Wicklow	-	1	-	-	0	1	-	1897

== Governance ==
=== Past chairmen ===
- James Nowlan Kilkenny - 1900–1904
- John Fitzgerald - 1905–1908
- Dan McCarthy Dublin- 1909–1910, 1919–1921
- John J. Hogan - 1911–1918
- Patrick D. Breen - Wexford 1922–1923
- Bob O'Keeffe Laois - 1924–1935
- Sean Robbins Offaly - 1936–1938
- Seamus Flood - 1939–1941
- Michael Kehoe Wexford- 1942–1944
- Fintan Brennan - 1945–1947
- Tom Walsh - 1948–1950
- Jack Fitzgerald - 1951–1953
- Dr. J. J. Stuart Dublin - 1954–1956
- Hugh Byrne Wicklow- 1957–1959
- Brendan Breathnach - 1960–1962
- Liam Geraghty - 1963–1965
- Bob Aylward - 1966–1968
- Jack Conroy - 1969–1971
- Tom Loftus Dublin - 1972–1974
- Jimmy Roche Wexford- 1975–1977
- Paddy Buggy Kilkenny - 1978–1980
- John Dowling Offaly - 1981–1983
- Peadar Kearney Louth - 1984–1986
- Jack Boothman Wicklow - 1987–1989
- Jimmy Gray Dublin - 1990–1992
- Albert Fallon - Longford 1993–1995
- Jim Berry - Wexford 1996–1998
- Seamus Aldridge Kildare - 1999–2001
- Nickey Brennan Kilkenny - 2002–2004
- Liam O'Neill Laois - 2005–2007
- Sheamus Howlin - Wexford 2008–2010
- Martin Skelly Longford - 2011–2013
- John Horan Dublin - 2014–2016
- Jim Bolger Carlow - 2017–2019
- Pat Teehan Offaly - 2020–2022
- Derek Kent Wexford - 2023-
