= McCague =

McCague is a surname. Notable people with the surname include:

- Martin McCague (born 1969), English cricketer
- George McCague (1929–2014), Canadian politician
- Seán McCague (1944/45–2022), Gaelic Athletic Association President
- Zelda McCague (1888–2001), Canadian supercentenarian
