= Seán Ryan (sports administrator) =

Gaelic sports player and administrator

Seán Ryan (1895 - 7 March 1963) was the tenth president of the Gaelic Athletic Association (1928–1932).

Born in County Tipperary, Ryan played both hurling and football for UCD, acting as UCD’s representative in the Dublin county board in the 1920s. He was the youngest person to have been elected president of the GAA. Also the only practicing lawyer to serve as president, Ryan served as legal adviser to the GAA for almost 30 years after his presidency. During this time, he was involved in the acquisition of several grounds for the GAA.

This article incorporates text available under the CC BY 3.0 license.

Sporting positions
Preceded by Liam Clifford	President of the Gaelic Athletic Association; 1928–1932	Succeeded by Seán McCarthy
