= Pat Fanning =

Waterford hurler

Personal information
- Native name: Pádraig Ó Fainín (Irish)
- Born: 25 August 1918 Waterford
- Died: 14 March 2010 (aged 91)

Sport
- Sport: Hurling
- Position: Forward
Club
- Years: Club
- 1930s–1950s: Mount Sion
Club titles
- Waterford titles: 7
Inter-county
- Years: County
- 1940s–1950s: Waterford
Inter-county titles
- Munster titles: 0
- All-Irelands: 0
- NHL: 0

Pat Fanning (25 August 1918 – 14 March 2010) was an Irish hurler who played for his local club Mount Sion and at senior level for the Waterford county team in the 1940s and 1950s. He won the county championship on seven occasions. Fanning also served as the 23rd president of the Gaelic Athletic Association from 1970 until 1973, and was honorary life president of Waterford's county board.

His election in succession of fellow Munster man Seamus Ryan marked the second time in history a province had consecutive presidents of the Gaelic Athletic Association. Fanning was the former president of the Gaelic Athletic Association to have survived the longest after serving.

== Presidency ==
Fanning's time as president of the Gaelic Athletic Association is remembered for the 1970 repealing of the ban on being associated with "foreign games". He had opposed the move, yet received praise for not objecting to the outcome of the national vote. When Croke Park admitted "foreign games" in 2005, Fanning said:

We were told in 1970 that rugby schools would embrace our games — not one rugby college relaxed their own severe ban on playing Gaelic Games and it resulted in a net loss for us . . . Opening Croke Park will double and treble the income of these other sports and give them more ammunition to intrude on our schools.

Fanning also oversaw the introduction of senior club All-Irelands during his presidency.

== Other life ==
Fanning was employed by the Department of Posts and Telegraphs. In later years he continued to comment on matters related to the GAA.

He died early morning on 14 March 2010 at the age of 91. Tributes came from Christy Cooney, President of the Gaelic Athletic Association at the time of Fanning's death.

== Honours ==
Fanning was honoured with the Appreciation Award at the Park Hotel in Dungarvan, County Waterford on 29 January 2005. The award was one of five given to Fanning, Paddy Joe Ryan (previously a county chairman), Seamas Grant (secretary), Tony Morrissey (treasurer), and Seamus O'Brien (a representative member of the Central Council), though Fanning spoke as a representative of them all.

Sporting positions
Preceded by Séamus Ó Riain	President of the Gaelic Athletic Association; 1970–1973	Succeeded by Donal Keenan
