= Michael Deering (sports administrator) =

Michael Deering (1858 - 25 March 1901) was the fifth president of the Gaelic Athletic Association (1898–1901).

Although born in Limerick, Michael Deering is most closely associated with Cork, where he helped to form the county board, of which he later became chairman.

He held a hurling tournament between clubs from Cork and Tipperary in 1886, which led to the introduction of intercounty competition.

During his time as chairman of the Cork county board, a dispute arose over the 1894 All-Ireland senior football final. In the replay of the final between Cork and Dublin, Cork were leading 1-2 to 0-5 (a goal was worth 5 points at the time) when several Dublin players were attacked by Cork supporters. Dublin refused to play on; Cork refused a second replay, and the GAA Central Council awarded the championship to Dublin.

Deering resigned from the Central Council, and a schism developed in the GAA, with Cork running its own All-Ireland. Cork reconciled with the GAA, and Deering returned to the Central Council, becoming president in 1898.

Michael Deering was the only GAA president to die in office.

Sporting positions
Preceded by Frank Dineen	President of the Gaelic Athletic Association; 1898–1901	Succeeded by James Nowlan
