= Liam Clifford =

Irish sports administrator (1876–1949)

William Peter "Liam" Clifford (27 June 1876 – 24 February 1949) was the ninth president of the Gaelic Athletic Association (1926–1928).

Involved in the dairy co-operative movement in Limerick and neighbouring Clare for many years, Clifford became the Department of Agriculture's chief dairy inspector in 1936.

Clifford was chairman of the Limerick county board for 20 years, and also had a term as chairman of the Munster board.

Under Liam Clifford's leadership, the Tipperary team toured America. Brendan Fullam stated 'the Tipperary hurling team – All-Ireland champions of 1925 – boarded the SS Bremen in early May and set forth on a most successful tour of the States'.

Additionally, during Clifford's presidency, the GAA decided to allocate ten percent of gate receipts for ground development, which led to the provision of grounds throughout the country, for which Clifford has been called "the great apostle of grounds development". Therefore, Clifford was described as 'the first President to encourage the various County Committees to purchase and develop grounds to be used exclusively for Gaelic Games'. Eamonn Sweeney stated 'in the implementation of Clifford's grounds programme; the GAA was unrivalled in its ability to provide grounds and facilities in the smallest of villages and towns'.

Sporting positions
Preceded by Patrick Breen	President of the Gaelic Athletic Association; 1926–1928	Succeeded by Seán Ryan
