= Joe McDonagh =

Irish hurler (1953–2016)

Personal information
- Native name: Seosamh Mac Donncha (Irish)
- Born: November 1953 Tuam, County Galway, Ireland
- Died: 20 May 2016 (aged 62) Galway, Ireland
- Occupations: CEO of Foras na Gaeilge, Chairman of Foras na Gaeilge, CEO of Mayo, Sligo and Leitrim ETB
- Height: 6 ft 0 in (183 cm)

Sport
- Sport: Hurling
- Position: Right wing-back
Clubs
- Years: Club
- Ballinderreen; Cortoon Shamrocks; Barna
Club titles
- Galway titles: 0
College
- Years: College
- 1972 -1977: University College Galway
College titles
- Fitzgibbon titles: 1
Inter-county*
Years	County	Apps (scores)
1972-1983	Galway	15 (0-00)
Inter-county titles
- All-Irelands: 1
- NHL: 1
- All Stars: 1
- *Inter County team apps and scores correct as of 21:22, 9 February 2014.

Joseph McDonagh (Irish: Seosamh Mac Donnchadha) (November 1953 – 20 May 2016) was an Irish hurler and, later, Gaelic games administrator, who served as the president of the Gaelic Athletic Association from 1997 until 2000. He played hurling with his club Ballinderreen and the Galway senior team.

He was also chief executive of Foras na Gaeilge from 2002 to 2006 and chairman of the same organisation from 2015 to 2016. The Joe McDonagh Cup and the Fondúireacht Sheosaimh Mhic Dhonncha (Joe McDonagh Foundation) are named after him.

== Early life and education ==
Born in Tuam, County Galway, McDonagh was introduced to hurling by his father, a long-serving Gaelic games administrator and schoolteacher. He developed his hurling skills at Coláiste Éinde, while also excelling at Gaelic football as a result of the coaching of teacher Enda Colleran.

With University College Galway (UCG), McDonagh played both Gaelic football and hurling and was a Fitzgibbon Cup medal winner as a postgraduate student in 1977. He was also a regular on the Sigerson Cup team in his time there, playing in five of the football competitions. He had previously won a Freshers hurling medal in 1972 and earned his B.A. from the university in 1975. His son, Eoin, also played in six Fizgibbon Cups for UCG.

McDonagh was a linguist who was fluent in three languages (Irish, English and Welsh). He went on to complete an M.A. in Celtic Studies.

McDonagh worked as an Irish teacher in Coláiste Éinde in Galway City for 16 years.

== Sports career ==
=== Club ===
McDonagh enjoyed a lengthy club hurling career with Ballinderreen, while he also played Gaelic football with Cortoon Shamrocks and Barna.

McDonagh captained his club Ballinderreen to the 1978 Galway Senior Hurling Championship Final. They faced neighbouring club Ardrahan. Played in Ballinasloe, the match ended in a draw, Ballinderreen 0-16 Ardrahan 2–10. After a close match in the replay, McDonagh's side lost by 2–14 to 2–18. Towards the latter end of his hurling career, Joe captained his side to win the Galway Junior B hurling Championship in 1996.

=== Inter-county ===
McDonagh made his début on the inter-county scene at the age of sixteen when he first linked up with the Galway minor team. An All-Ireland runner-up in this grade, he later won an All-Ireland medal with the under-21 team. McDonagh made his senior début during the 1972-73 league. He went on to play a key role for Galway during a breakthrough era, and won one All-Ireland medal as a non-playing substitute in 1980 and one National Hurling League medal. He was an All-Ireland runner-up on two occasions.

One of the most iconic moments associated with McDonagh is his rendition of "The West's Awake" from the Hogan Stand in Croke Park after winning that All-Ireland with Galway in 1980. RTÉ commentator Michael O'Hehir responded: "Well done Joe McDonagh".

Throughout his career McDonagh made 15 championship appearances for Galway. His retirement came following the conclusion of the 1983 championship. In 2005, the Irish Independent named him amongst its substitutes in its list of "The Men Who Changed the Face of Galway Hurling".

=== Inter-provincial ===
As a member of the Connacht inter-provincial team at various times throughout his career, McDonagh won two Railway Cup medals.

== Retirement from sport and later life ==
In retirement from playing McDonagh became involved in the administrative affairs of the Gaelic Athletic Association. He was elected to the Galway County Board as Irish Officer in 1979 and went on to represent Galway on the Central Council in 1988, being appointed to the chair of the hurling work group on his first day. Runner-up to Jack Boothman in the 1993 election for the position, he subsequently became the 32nd president of the Gaelic Athletic Association between 1997 and 2000.

McDonagh became chief executive officer of Galway Vocational Committee in 2006. He later became chief executive officer of the Mayo, Sligo and Leitrim Education Board from 2013 2015.

McDonagh was Chief Executive of Foras na Gaeilge from 2002 to 2006. Foras na Gaeilge became an all-Ireland crossborder body during this time, as part of the Good Friday Agreement. He later was a member of Foras na Gaeilge's Board from 2011 to 2015 and became chairman of the board in December 2015.

McDonagh died on 20 May 2016, following a short illness. Invited to attend a reunion with his teammates at his university in November 2015, he was unable to attend as he had been in hospital with what was thought to be pneumonia. The illness was later discovered to be cancer, which ultimately proved terminal. His son, Eoin, delivering an oration at the funeral mass, quoted O'Hehir in concluding: "Well done Joe McDonagh".

== Eponym ==
The Joe McDonagh Cup was created in 2017 as the new second tier senior inter-county championship in hurling after the All-Ireland Senior Hurling Championship. It was contested for the first time in 2018.

Fondúireacht Sheosaimh Mhic Dhonncha, a funding scheme to support GAA clubs to promote and develop the Irish language, was established by the GAA and Glór na nGael in his memory.

== Honours ==
=== Player ===
University College Galway

- Fitzgibbon Cup: 1977

Ballinderreen

- Galway Junior B Hurling Championship: 1996 (c)

Galway

- All-Ireland Senior Hurling Championship: 1980
- National Hurling League: 1974-75
- All-Ireland Under-21 Hurling Championship: 1972

Connacht

- Railway Cup: 1982, 1983

=== Individual ===
Awards

- All-Star (1): 1976

Sporting positions
Preceded by Frank Burke	Galway Senior Hurling Captain; 1979	Succeeded by Joe Connolly
Preceded by Jack Boothman	President of the Gaelic Athletic Association; 1997–2000	Succeeded by Seán McCague
