= Aodh Ó Broin =

20th president of the Gaelic Athletic Association

Aodh Ó Broin (Hugh Byrne) (d. 3 July 1993) was the 20th president of the Gaelic Athletic Association.

Born in Rathdangan, County Wicklow, he attended secondary school in Knockbeg College and went on to play in the Sigerson Cup with UCD. He won 2 Wicklow Senior Football Championships with Bray Emmets in 1934 and 1935.

He became chairman of Wicklow GAA County Board in 1947, and later served as chairman of Leinster GAA.

Sporting positions
Preceded by Joseph Stuart	President of the Gaelic Athletic Association; 1961–1964	Succeeded by Alf Murray
