= Nowlan Park =

Stadium in Kilkenny, County Kilkenny, Ireland

- Páirc Uí Nualláin
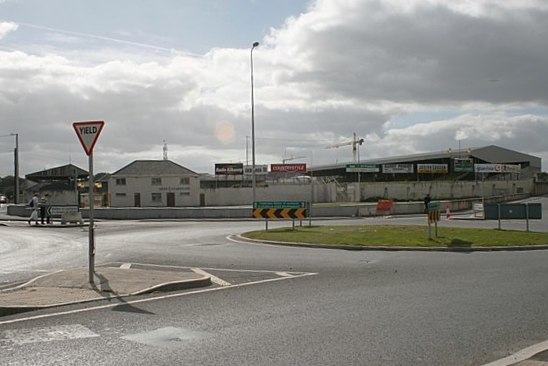
- Interactive map of Nowlan Park
- Full name: UPMC Nowlan Park
- Location: O'Loughlin Road, Kilkenny, County Kilkenny, R95 WN66, Ireland
- Coordinates: 52°39′23″N 7°14′22″W
- Owner: Kilkenny GAA
- Capacity: 27,000 (18,000 seated)
- Field size: 145 x 88 m
- Public transit: Kilkenny railway station

Nowlan Park (/ˈnoʊlən/; Páirc Uí Nualláin), known for sponsorship reasons as UPMC Nowlan Park, is the principal Gaelic Athletic Association stadium in Kilkenny, Ireland. Named after James Nowlan, the longest serving President of the GAA, the stadium hosts major hurling matches and is home to the Kilkenny hurling team. It opened in 1927, replacing St. James Park.

== Facilities ==
The stadium consists of the following stands:

- Old Stand (O'Loughlin Road) mainly bench-seats (uncovered, planning for a new roof submitted after storm damaged the old roof in 2014) (The new roof completed in late 2014 and opened in early 2015)
- Paddy Grace Stand (New Stand, Hebron Road) mainly bench-seats (covered)
- Ted Carrol Stand (country end) 4,000 plastic seats (covered)
- City Terrace (covered)

The target capacity under the Kilkenny GAA 2010-15 plan was 30,000. A large portion of the Old Stand's roof was blown off during a violent storm on 12 February 2014. The rest was removed for health and safety reasons.

== Hurling ==
History was made at Nowlan Park on 7 June 2014 when Kilkenny versus Offaly was broadcast on Sky Sports, the first time a Championship fixture of any kind was broadcast live to a UK-wide audience. British viewers were reported to have been "amazed and confused [...] bemused but impressed [...] amused and confounded" after catching a glimpse of the broadcast.

== Other uses ==
Nowlan Park also serves as a concert venue, with festivals featuring performers such as Andrea Bocelli, Rod Stewart, Bob Dylan, Neil Young, Paul Simon, Bryan Ferry, James Taylor, Shania Twain, Dolly Parton, and in July 2013 it played host to the European tour finale of Bruce Springsteen. Springsteen performed at the venue again on 12 May 2024 as part of the Springsteen and E Street Band 2023 Tour. Bob Dylan and Neil Young performed live together in Nowlan Park in July 2019. Garth Brooks is due to play two shows in the stadium in June 2027.

Nowlan Park was also included in Ireland's bid to host the 2023 Rugby World Cup.

During the COVID-19 pandemic, Nowlan Park was used as a drive-through test centre.

== Naming rights ==
It was announced, in October 2019, that the University of Pittsburgh Medical Center (UPMC) had agreed a naming-rights deal with the Kilkenny County Board. Running for 10 years, from 2019, the sponsorship deal involved the rebranding of the ground to "UPMC Nowlan Park".

== See also ==
- List of Gaelic Athletic Association stadiums
- List of stadiums in Ireland by capacity
