= Séamus Gardiner =

Gaelic football player and sports administrator

President of the Gaelic Athletic Association
- In office 1943–1946
- Preceded by: Pádraig MacNamee
- Succeeded by: Daniel O'Rourke

Personal details
- Born: 1894
- Died: 10 January 1976 (aged 81–82)

Séamus Gardiner (1894 – 10 January 1976) was the 14th president of the Gaelic Athletic Association (1943–1946).

Born in Clare, he played football for UCD while studying there, he trained to be a national school teacher in De La Salle College, Waterford.

He played on the Clare senior team, and in 1924 was part of a Munster team that participated in an inter-provincial contest to choose a team for the Tailteann Games.

Settling in Borrisokane, he became involved in the local GAA club, representing it at board meetings, before going on to become chairman of the board, from 1933 to 1938. In 1940, he was elected vice-chairman of the Munster Council, and chairman in 1940.

During Gardiner's presidency, relationships began to renew with the President of Ireland for the first time since Douglas Hyde was removed as a patron.

Also during Gardiner's presidency, the Minister of Defence opened up the army to sports other than Gaelic Games, which Gardiner called "a retrograde step", and that the GAA were "entitled to the same treatment for Gaelic games as they had for the past 20 years".

Two years after his death, in 1978 the Séamus Gardiner Memorial Park was renamed in his honour.

Gardiner's great-granddaughters, Emer Lucey and Ciara Lucey, played senior camogie for Ballyboden St Enda's and Dublin.

Sporting positions
Preceded by Pádraig MacNamee	President of the Gaelic Athletic Association; 1943–1946	Succeeded by Daniel O'Rourke
