= John Dowling (sports administrator) =

Gaelic Athletic Association president (1931–2002)

John Dowling (18 November 1931 – 9 February 2002) was a Gaelic football and hurling referee, who served as the 29th president of the Gaelic Athletic Association (GAA). He was born in Tullamore, County Offaly, and became the first Offaly man to hold that office.

== Career ==
Dowling refereed five All-Ireland finals, including both hurling and football All-Ireland senior finals in 1960. That year he officiated Down's first All-Ireland SFC title win. Dowling refereed Connacht, Leinster, Munster and Ulster finals as well as league finals. At his death, suddenly at the age of 71 in February 2002, he was described as "arguably the greatest ever GAA referee".

He was part of the team that founded the original Tullamore Harriers Club alongside his brother Billy Dowling.

He went on to serve as Club Secretary, County Secretary and Chairman of the Leinster Provincial Council.

In his time as County Secretary, first the Offaly county football team in the 1970s and then the Offaly county hurling team in the 1980s came to prominence, with Dowling credited for his part in this. When Offaly defeated Kilkenny in the 1980 Leinster Senior Hurling Championship final, Dowling was seen near Damien Martin's goal during the second half, urging the team onwards to a first Leinster SHC title.

From 1981 to 1983 he served as chairman of GAA's Leinster Council. He was elected 29th president of the Gaelic Athletic Association, taking office in 1988 and serving until 1991. As GAA president he negotiated land to help develop Croke Park.

== Personal life ==
Born and raised in Tullamore, Dowling worked for An Post from his teenage years. Married to May, the couple had two sons and two daughters, along with his seven grandchildren.

Gaelic games
Preceded by Mick Loftus	President of the Gaelic Athletic Association; 1988–1991	Succeeded by Peter Quinn
