= Jack Boothman =

President of the Gaelic Athletic Association (1994–1997)

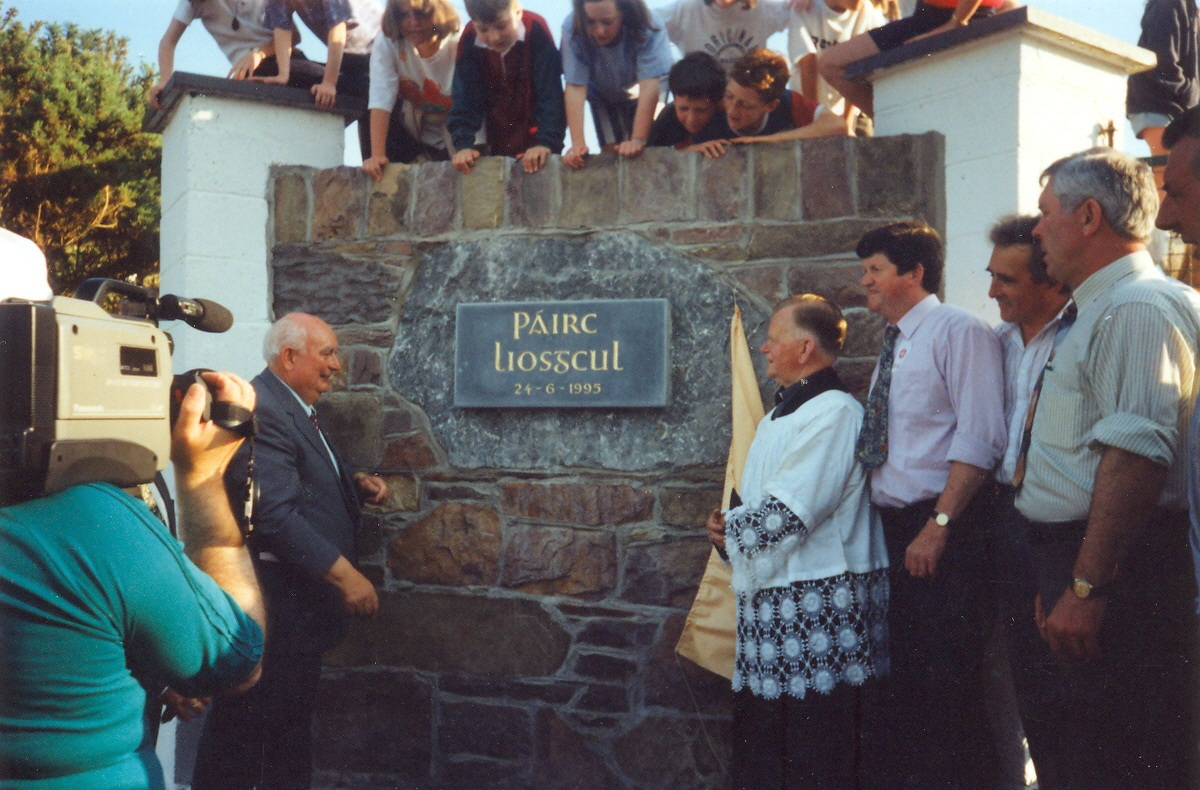
Opening of Pric Liosgcul by GAA President Jack Boothman in 1995

John Henry "Jack" Boothman (12 October 1935 – 10 May 2016) was the 31st president of the Gaelic Athletic Association (GAA) between 1994 and 1997. He was an active member of his local Blessington GAA club in County Wicklow.

He was chairman of the Leinster Council from 1987 until 1989.

He was elected as president of the Association and took up the position in 1994. Boothman championed the abolition of Rule 21, which debarred members of the British security forces from joining the GAA.

However, Boothman opposed the opening up of Croke Park to international soccer and rugby, feeling that it would be a "disastrous mistake" for the GAA to benefit competing sports so significantly.

A member of the Church of Ireland and past pupil of The King's Hospital, Dublin, Boothman was the first Protestant president of the GAA. Until his death at the age of 80 in 2016, he still held the position of President within his own local club.

Gaelic games
Preceded by Peter Quinn	President of the Gaelic Athletic Association; 1994–1997	Succeeded by Joe McDonagh
