= Gael Linn Cup 1957 =

1957 Camogie competition

Tournament details
- Date: 17 November 1957 (final)

Winners
- Champions: Leinster (2nd title)

Runners-up
- Runners-up: Munster

Other
- Matches played: 3

The 1957 Gael Linn Cup was the second edition of an annual representative competition for elite level participants in the women's team field sport of camogie, contested by teams representing the four provinces of Ireland. It was won by Leinster, who defeated Munster in the final, played at Cahir.

== Arrangements ==
In the semi-finals on 27 October, Connacht was defeated by Munster 1-2 to 2-1 at the Pearse Stadium in Galway, and Leinster defeated Ulster 4–0 to 2–0 at Parnell Park in Dublin. On 17 November during a miserably cold and wet afternoon in Cahir, Leinster won their second title by defeating Munster 5–1 to 3–1. It was a step in securing the future of the fledgeling competition. Agnes Hourigan, president of the Camogie Association, wrote in the The Irish Press:

It was only in the last five minutes that Leinster got on top in a game which produced play of a high standard despite an almost continuous downpour. The standard of play and the opportunity to see players who would not have the opportunity to play in an Al-Ireland final were enough to silence those who doubted the wisdom of inter-provincial camogie.

=== Final stages ===
17 November
Final

Leinster	5-1 — 3-1	Munster

Cahir

Leinster	Munster

Leinster:
GK	1	Kathleen Woods (Louth)
FB	2	May Kavanagh (Wicklow)
RWB	3	Vera Lee (Kildare)
CB	4	Agnes Kavanagh (Wicklow)
LWB	5	May Kavanagh (Dublin)
MF	6	Bríd Reid (Dublin) (0–1)
MF	7	Annette Corrigan (captain) (Dublin)
MF	8	Anna May Brennan (Laois)
RWF	9	Mary O'Sullivan (Dublin) (1–0)
CF	10	Annie Donnelly (Dublin) (2–0)
LWF	11	Una O'Connor (Dublin) (1–0)
FF	12	Jean Hannon (Wicklow) (1–0)

Munster:
GK	1	Catherine Carroll (Tipperary)
FB	2	Betty Walsh (Cork)
RWB	3	Bridie Lucey (Cork)
CB	4	Teresa Murphy (Cork)
LWB	5	Josie McNamara (Waterford)
MF	6	Terry Griffin (Tipperary)
MF	7	Anna Crotty (Cork)
MF	8	Mary Nugent (Waterford)
RWF	9	Noreen Duggan (Cork) (2–0)
CF	10	Mary England (Tipperary)
LWF	11	Mona Joyce (Cork) (1–1)
FF	12	Kathleen Griffin (Tipperary)

Preceded by Gael Linn Cup 1956	Gael Linn Cup; 1956 – 2016	Succeeded by Gael Linn Cup 1958
