= Peter Quinn (sports administrator) =

Northern Irish sports administrator (born 1943)

- Peadar Ó Coinn

President of the Gaelic Athletic Association
- In office 1991–1994
- Preceded by: John Dowling
- Succeeded by: Jack Boothman

Personal details
- Born: November 1943 (age 82) County Fermanagh, Northern Ireland
- Occupation: Financial Advisor

Peter Quinn (born 1943) served as the 30th president of the Gaelic Athletic Association from 1991 until 1994. A native of Gortmullan, Teemore, County Fermanagh, Northern Ireland, Quinn is a financial advisor by profession. He is also a brother of Seán Quinn.

Quinn played for the Teemore club in Fermanagh, winning a Junior Football Championship. However, his only involvement with the Fermanagh seniors was in the Dr Lagan Cup and some challenge matches; he was never even included in a championship panel.

His autobiography is entitled The Outsider.

Gaelic games
Preceded by John Dowling	President of the Gaelic Athletic Association; 1991–1994	Succeeded by Jack Boothman
