= Bob O'Keeffe =

Irish hurler

Personal information
- Native name: Roibeárd Ó Caoimh (Irish)
- Born: 1881 Glengrant, near Mooncoin, County Kilkenny, Ireland
- Died: 1949 (aged 67–68) Borris-in-Ossory, County Laois, Ireland
- Occupation: Teacher

Sport
- Sport: Hurling
Clubs
- Years: Club
- Mooncoin; St. Peter's; Borris-in-Ossory
Inter-county
- Years: County
- 1914-1915: Laois
Inter-county titles
- Leinster titles: 2
- All-Irelands: 1

Robert O'Keeffe (1881 – 1949) was an Irish hurler who played for the Laois senior team.

O'Keeffe was a regular member of the starting fifteen during the 1914 and 1915 championship campaigns. During that time he won one All-Ireland medal and back-to-back Leinster medals.

At club level O'Keeffe had a lengthy career, playing with Mooncoin in Kilkenny, St Peter's in Meath and Borris-in-Ossory in Laois.

In retirement from playing O'Keeffe served as a high-ranking referee and was heavily involved in the administration of the GAA. He was chairman of the Leinster Council, before serving as president of the GAA from 1935 to 1938.

Sporting positions
Preceded by Patrick D. Breen	Chairman of the Leinster Council of the GAA; 1924–1935	Succeeded by Seán Robbins
Preceded by Seán McCarthy	President of the Gaelic Athletic Association; 1935–1938	Succeeded by Pádraig MacNamee
