= Gael Linn Cup 1956 =

1956 Camogie competition

Winners
- Champions: Leinster (1st title)
- Captain: Annette Corrigan

Runners-up
- Runners-up: Ulster

Other
- Matches played: 3

The 1956 Gael Linn Cup was a new representative competition for elite level participants in the women's team field sport of camogie, contested by teams representing the four provinces of Ireland. It was won by Leinster, who defeated Ulster in the final on 18 November, played at Knockbridge.

== Background ==
The idea of an inter-provincial tournament had been discussed for a decade before 1956 but was slow to be brought to fruition. This was inspired by the memory of successful interprovincial camogie matches which were played as part of the 1928 and 1932 Tailteann Games programmes. The GAA's Railway Cup tournaments were then at the height of their popularity, attracting a record attendance of 49,023 to their St. Patrick's Day finals double fixture of March 1954 and 52,619 to the 1955 hurling final. It was decided that an inter-provincial camogie match would be played on 19 September 1954 in Navan as part of the 50th anniversary celebrations of the Camogie Association, as a tribute to Navan's role in hosting the very first camogie match at The Showgrounds in July 1904.

=== Exhibition match in Navan ===
Munster beat Ulster by 8–3 to 5–3 in a match that was described as the best of the year. Con Keneally wrote in the Irish Independent:

In no way perturbed by the heavy rain that fell for most of the game the two teams gave an admirable display. Kathleen Mills and Una O'Connor had first class games. Una O'Connor was particularly prominent at the end as was the full forward Kay Douglas who had to work very hard before she got the better of the Ulster full back Moya Forde.

19 September 1954

Munster	8-3 — 5-3	Ulster

Páirc Tailteann, Navan

Leinster	Ulster

|}

Leinster:
GK	1	Eileen Duffy (Dublin)
FB	2	May Kavanagh (Dublin)
RWB	3	Ettie Kearns (Meath)
CB	4	Sheila Donnelly (Dublin)
LWB	5	Aggie Kavanagh (Wicklow)
MF	6	Aileen Kearns (Meath)
MF	7	Annette Corrigan (Dublin) (0–1)
MF	8	Kathleen Mills (Dublin) (2–1)
RWF	9	Una O'Connor (Dublin) (3–0)
CF	10	Sheila Sleator (Dublin)
LWF	11	Eileen Bourke (Dublin) (2–0)
FF	12	Kay Douglas (Wicklow) (1–1)

Ulster:
GK	1	Bernie Kelly (Down)
FB	2	Moya Forde (Antrim)
RWB	3	Teresa Halferty (Derry)
CB	4	Carrie Rankin (Derry)
LWB	5	Bernadette King (Armagh)
MF	6	Maeve Gilroy (Antrim) (1–0)
MF	7	Nancy Danagher (Cavan)
MF	8	Ita O'Reilly (Antrim) (1–0)
RWF	9	Patsy McCloskey (Derry) (2–1)
CF	10	Deirdre O'Gorman (Antrim) (1–1)
LWF	11	Chris Hughes (Antrim)
FF	12	Patsy O'Brien (Derry) (0–1)

== Prelude to inaugural competition ==
It still took two years for the new inter-provincial tournament to reach fruition. Notwithstanding the role of the rival Conradh na Gaeilge in the foundation and early history of camogie, Irish language organisation Gael Linn donated a trophy for inter-provincial competition, which was handed by Gael Linn trustee Máire Breathnach to Sile Nic an Ultaigh at a ceremony in Dublin on 11 November 1956 Donal Ó Moráin said Gael Linn were delighted to show special appreciation of the Camogie Association because

It is one of those national bodies which has done so much for the Irish sport. I hope the Gael Linn competition will encourage more colleges to give preference to camogie in their sporting activities.

== The Final ==
In the semi-final Leinster defeated Munster 6–4 to 4–2 at Cahir. Ulster got a bye to the final as Connacht did not enter a team. On 18 November Leinster then defeated Ulster, 7–1 to 3–1, in the final at Knockbridge, County Louth, with Dublin forward Una O'Connor scoring five goals.

Agnes Hourigan wrote in The Irish Press:

The Leinster captain Annette Corrigan was brilliant throughout and gave her side great inspiration as she controlled the midfield. Una O'Connor laid the foundation of the Leinster victory with her three first half goals, but there was no better forward than Kay Mills.

=== Final stages ===
18 November 1956
Final

Leinster	7-1 — 3-1	Ulster

Knockbridge

Leinster	Ulster

Leinster:
GK	1	Kathleen Woods (Louth)
FB	2	May Kavanagh (Wicklow)
RWB	3	Claire Monaghan (Kildare)
CB	4	Kay Ryder (Dublin)
LWB	5	May Kavanagh (Dublin)
MF	6	Lily Parle (Wexford)
MF	7	Annette Corrigan (Dublin) (captain)
MF	8	Kathleen Mills (Dublin)
RWF	9	Fran Maher (Dublin)
CF	10	Mary O'Sullivan (Dublin)
LWF	11	Una O'Connor (Dublin)
FF	12	Kay Douglas (Wicklow)

Ulster:
GK	1	Teresa Kearns (Antrim)
FB	2	Moya Forde (Antrim)
RWB	3	Mona Kelly (Down)
CB	4	Winnie Kearns (Antrim)
LWB	5	Deirdre O'Gorman (Antrim)
MF	6	Ita O'Reilly (Antrim)
MF	7	Margaret Dorrity (Derry)
MF	8	Maeve Gilroy (Antrim)
RWF	9	Marion Kearns (Antrim)
CF	10	Madge Rainey (Antrim)
LWF	11	Chris Hughes (Antrim)
FF	12	Grace Connolly (Antrim)

Preceded by None	Gael Linn Cup; 1956 – 2016	Succeeded by Gael Linn Cup 1957
