= Pádraig MacNamee =

Gaelic sports administrator (1896–1975)

Pádraig MacNamee (Irish: Pádraig Mac Conn Mhide) (8 September 1896– 28 March 1975), originally from Carrickasticken Road, Forkhill, County Armagh was the 13th president of the Gaelic Athletic Association (1938–1943).

A lifelong Irish language enthusiast, who worked as an examiner for the Northern Ireland Education Board, MacNamee was the first Ulsterman to serve as president of the GAA.

MacNamee is best remembered as the president of the GAA at the time of the removal of Douglas Hyde as patron of the GAA. This was not an easy decision, particularly as Hyde had done so much to promote the Irish language, an issue close to MacNamee's heart.

In his honour, each year the GAA presents the McNamee awards for excellence in the areas of communication, public relations and journalism, specifically in relation to the GAA.

Páirc Mac Con Midhe in Holywood, County Down is the home of Naomh Pól CLG and is named after MacNamee as he had been head teacher in St Patrick's National School in the town for many years.

This article incorporates text available under the CC BY 3.0 license.

Sporting positions
Preceded by Bob O'Keeffe	President of the Gaelic Athletic Association; 1938–1943	Succeeded by Séamus Gardiner
