= James Nowlan =

Gaelic Athletic Association president

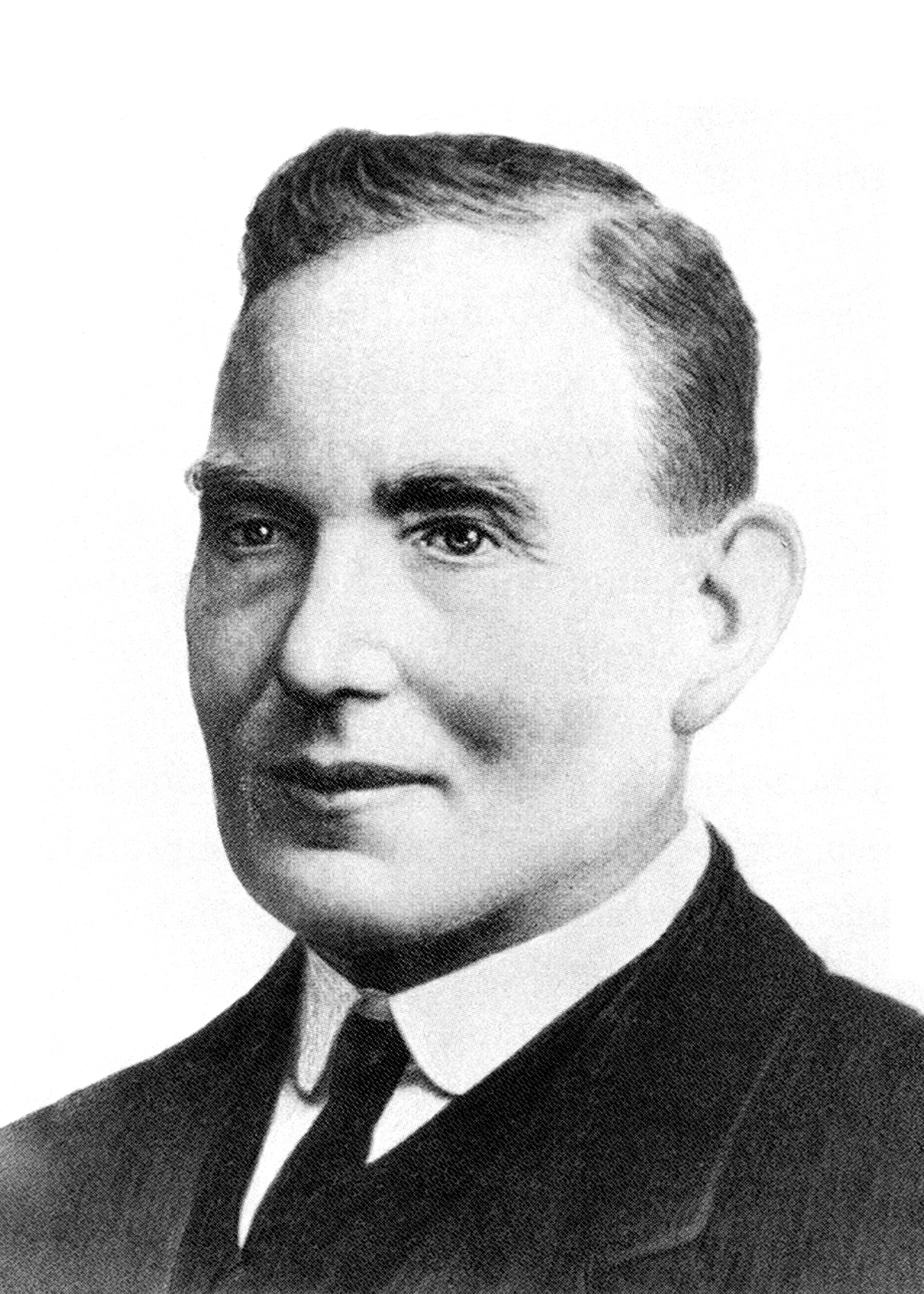
James Nowlan

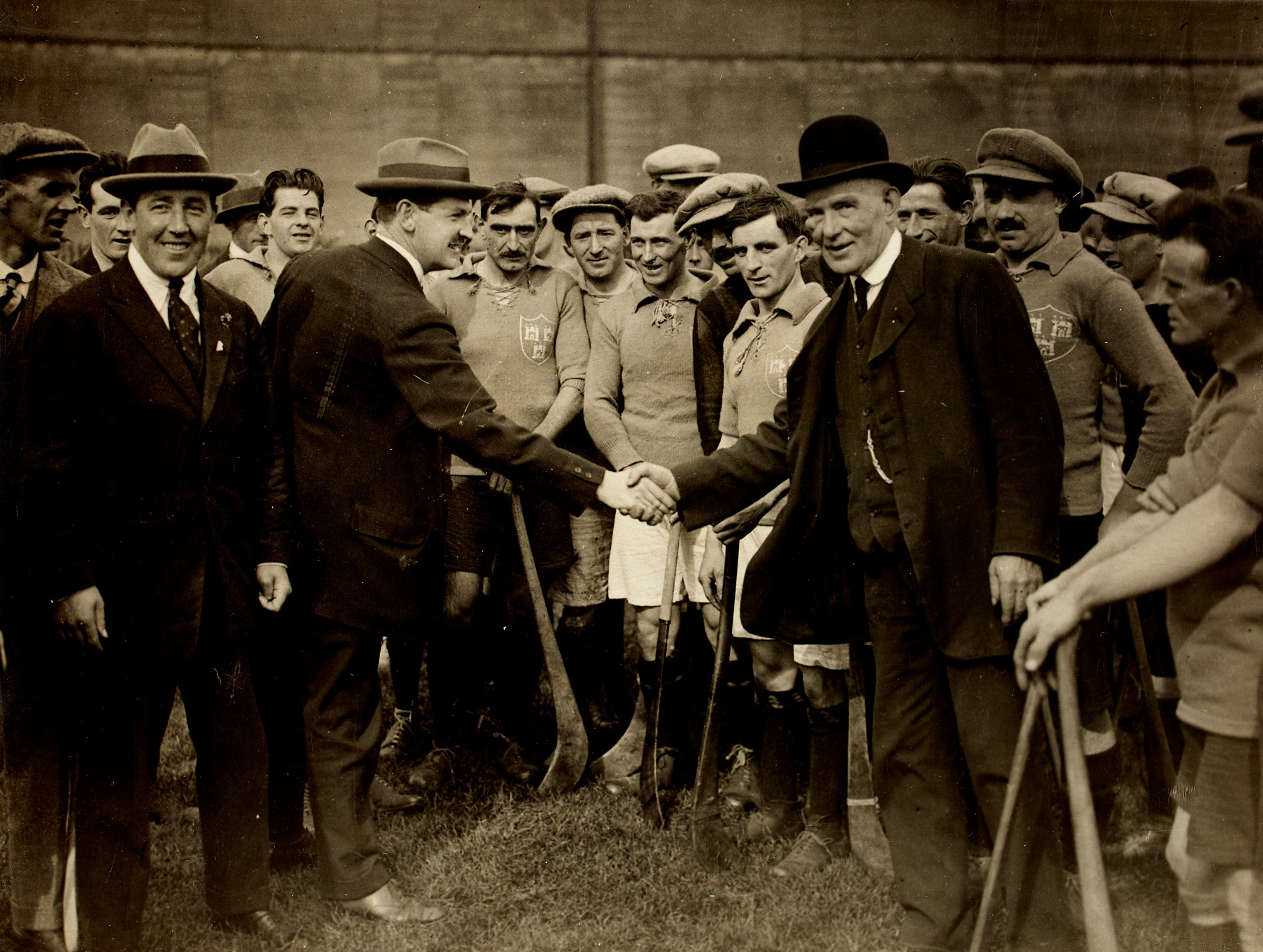
James Nowlan (right - dark suit with bowler style hat) shakes hands with Michael Collins (left) ahead of the 1921 Leinster hurling final

James Nowlan (1862 – June 1924) was president of the Gaelic Athletic Association (GAA) from 1901 to 1921 and is the longest serving president of that organisation. He was also a Sinn Féin representative and member of the Gaelic League. In 2009, he was named in the Sunday Tribune's list of the 125 Most Influential People In GAA History.

== Early life ==
Nowlan was born in Monasterevin, County Kildare in 1862 and is listed in the local church as being baptised at Cowpasture, Monasterevin on 25 May 1862. His father, Patrick Nowlan, was an early member of the Irish Republican Brotherhood (IRB) and friend of James Stephens. Patrick Nowlan was a cooper from Kilkenny city and possibly moved from there to work at Cassidy's Whiskey in Monasterevin. James Nowlan also trained as a cooper.

== Career ==
Nowlan was a member of Conradh na Gaeilge, a lifelong supporter of the Irish language revival movement and a supporter of Sinn Féin from its foundation in 1905. In 1898, he was elected an alderman of Kilkenny Corporation. He used his time in this position to help promote the GAA, which had been set up 14 years prior and was a relatively new organisation at the time.

In 1900, he became the first chairman of the Leinster Council of the GAA. He was elected president of the GAA nationally at the 1901 Congress held in September of that year. He would hold that position for twenty years - making him the longest serving president. During his time in office, he attempted to steer the organisation on a more republican path.

Following the Easter Rising, Nowlan was arrested by the British authorities in May 1916 and interned at the Frongoch internment camp in Wales. In August of that year, he was released and continued with his GAA and Sinn Féin duties. He publicly voiced support for the IRA during the Irish War of Independence. At the 1921 Congress, held in March of that year, Nowlan retired as GAA president, and was appointed Honorary Life President of the association — the only person to be so honoured.

== Death and legacy ==
Nowlan died in June 1924 in his mid-70s. Nowlan Park, the GAA stadium in his native Kilkenny, was renamed in his honour three years later. He was buried in Glasnevin cemetery. There was no headstone on his grave until 2013 when the GAA erected a Celtic cross. In September 2016 the GAA unveiled a new trophy named The James Nowlan Cup to be presented to the All-Ireland under-21 hurling champions.

Sporting positions
Preceded by Michael Deering	President of the Gaelic Athletic Association; 1901–1921	Succeeded by Daniel McCarthy
