= Séamus Ó Riain =

Irish hurler, Gaelic footballer and Gaelic games administrator (1916–2007)

President of the Gaelic Athletic Association
- In office 1967–1970
- Preceded by: Alf Murray
- Succeeded by: Pat Fanning

Personal details
- Born: James Ryan; 2 April 1916 Moneygall, County Offaly, Ireland
- Died: 27 January 2007 (aged 90) Moneygall, County Offaly, Ireland
- Spouse: Mary Ryan
- Children: 10
- Education: De La Salle College Waterford
- Occupation: Primary school teacher

Séamus Ó Riain (2 April 1916 – 27 January 2007) was an Irish hurler, Gaelic footballer and Gaelic games administrator. He served as the 22nd president of the Gaelic Athletic Association from 1967 until 1970.

Born in Moneygall on the Offaly-Tipperary border, Ó Riain was educated at Coláiste Éinde, Colaiste Caoimhin and De La Salle College Waterford where he trained as a national school teacher. He subsequently worked as a teacher in Cloughjordan, Newcastle West, Borrisokane and Dunkerrin.

Ó Riain first enjoyed sporting success during his studies in De La Salle. Here he won two county championship medals as a Gaelic footballer, as well as being awarded the gold medal for best all-round sportsman. At various times between 1938 and 1947 Ó Riain was a dual player with the Tipperary junior teams.

In the mid-1940s Ó Riain first became involved in the administrative affairs of the GAA when he was elected secretary of the Moneygall club before later representing the club on the North Tipperary Board. In 1955 he was elected vice-chairman of the board before serving as chairman between 1957 and 1966. Ó Riain's growing expertise as an administrator was further rewarded in 1958 when he was elected as one of top Tipperary delegates on the Munster Council. In 1962 he was elected vice-chairman of the provincial council before taking over as chairman in 1965.

Ó Riain was elected president of the Gaelic Athletic Association in 1967. His three-year tenure marked some major developments, including the inauguration of Scór, the Australian Football World Tour, the setting up of the Commission on the Affairs of the GAA, the launching of the Club Development Scheme, and the decision to build a modern handball court in Croke Park.

On completion of his term as president in 1970 Ó Riain took over as chairman of the Tipperary County Board. During his tenure he initiated the Féile na nGael.

Ó Riain died on 27 January 2007.

== See also ==
- Shane Ryan (Dublin Gaelic footballer), his grandson

Sporting positions
Preceded by Pat Fanning	Chairman of the Munster Council; 1965-1967	Succeeded by Paddy Ryan
Preceded by Alf Murray	President of the Gaelic Athletic Association; 1967–1970	Succeeded by Pat Fanning
Preceded by Philip Fogarty	Chairman of the Tipperary County Board; 1970-1973	Succeeded by Tom O'Hara
