= Alf Murray =

Armagh Gaelic footballer

Personal information
- Native name: Alf Ó Muirí (Irish)
- Born: 24 December 1914 Dromore, County Down
- Died: 12 March 1999 (aged 84) Lurgan, County Armagh
- Occupation: Primary school principal

Sport
- Sport: Gaelic football
- Position: Right wing-forward
Club
- Years: Club
- 1930s–1940s: Clann Éireann
Club titles
- Armagh titles: 0
Inter-county
- Years: County
- 1935–1945: Armagh
Inter-county titles
- Ulster titles: 0
- All-Irelands: 0
- NFL: 0
- All Stars: 1

Alf Murray (24 December 1914 – 12 March 1999) was an Irish Gaelic footballer who played as a right wing-forward at senior level for the Armagh county team.

Murray joined the team during the 1935 championship and was a regular member of the starting fifteen for the next decade. He failed to win any silverware at senior level, however, he did win an Ulster medal at junior level in 1935.

Murray had a lengthy club career with Clann Éireann.

In retirement from playing Murray was involved in the administration of the GAA. He was secretary of the Armagh County Board and chairman of the Ulster Council, before serving as president of the GAA from 1964 to 1967.

== Education ==
Murray was awarded a teacher training scholarship to St Mary's College of Education, Strawberry Hill, London.

== Teaching ==
He taught for a short time in Newry and Derrymacash before spending 40 years at Tannaghmore Primary School where he was to become Vice Principal and Principal.

Sporting positions
Preceded by Hugh Byrne	President of the Gaelic Athletic Association; 1964–1967	Succeeded by Séamus Ó Riain
Awards
Preceded by John Joe Landers; Tim Landers (Kerry)	All-Time All Star Award; 1986	Succeeded by Mick Higgins (Cavan)
