= Frank Dineen =

Gaelic sports administrator (1862–1916)

Frank Brazil Dineen
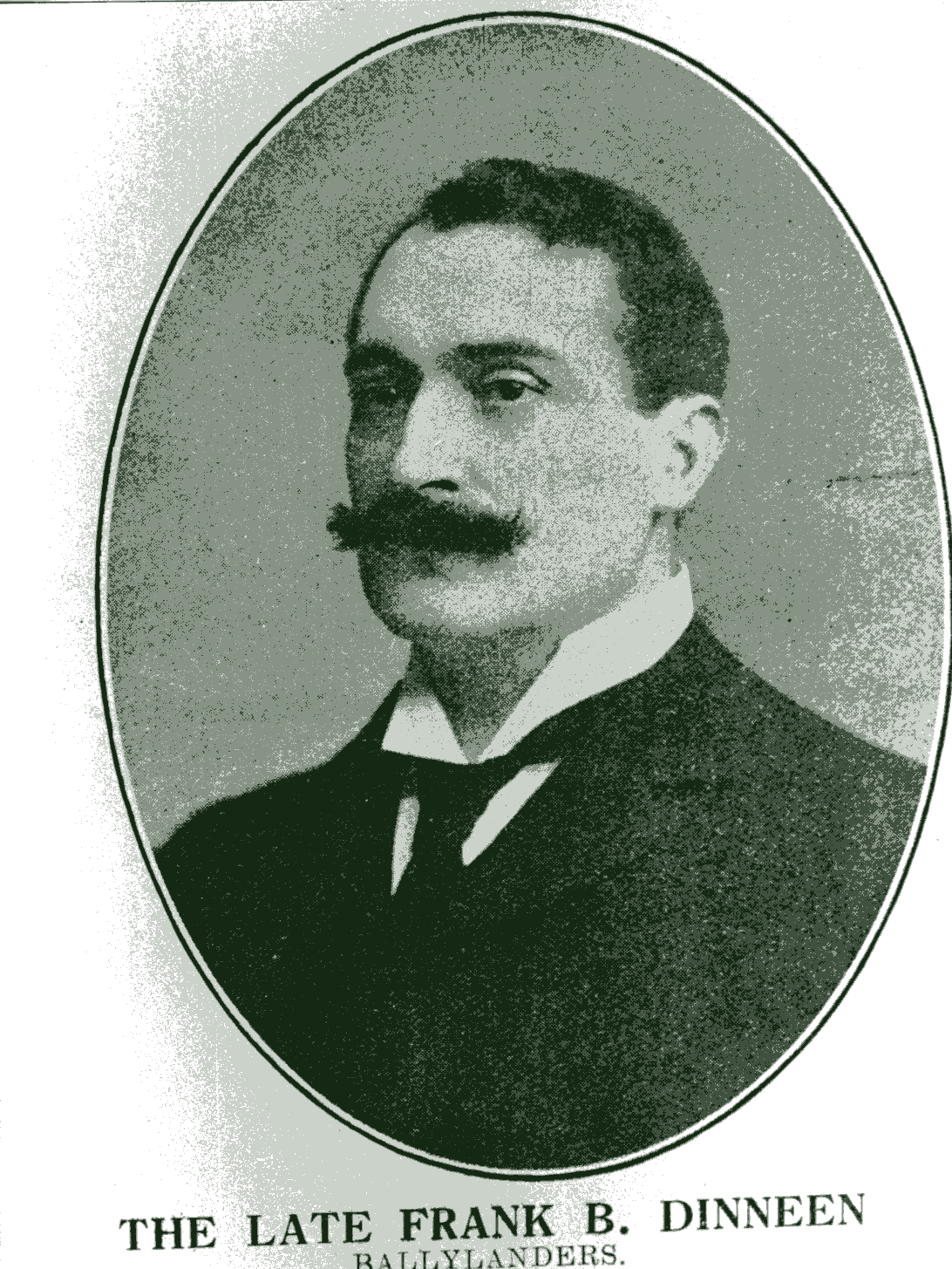

Personal details
- Born: 1862
- Died: 18 April 1916 (aged 54)
- Resting place: Glasnevin Cemetery, County Dublin

Frank Brazil Dineen (1862 – 18 April 1916) was a Gaelic games administrator and the fourth president of the Gaelic Athletic Association. From Ballylanders in County Limerick, he was elected General Secretary of the GAA in 1898 and is the only man to have ever held the two top positions within the Association. An athlete in the 1880s, Dineen was the fastest Irish sprinter of his day. He was also a founder of Ballylanders Shamrocks. He is also noted as the man who purchased a site on Jones Road in 1908 before donating it to the GAA for free in 1913, the site now of Croke Park. Dineen held the ground in trust for the GAA, which at the time was not able to purchase the land itself. Between 1908 and 1910 he oversaw development of the ground, paying for the improvements himself.

== Introduction ==
Frank Brazil Dineen, a GAA activist, was born in Ballylanders, County Limerick, 1862. Dineen is known for purchasing a site on Jones Road in 1908 and giving it to the GAA free of charge in 1913. He developed all 14 acres of the grounds of this property for five years and funded it himself. He was the only man who saw the possibilities for this land and without Dineen's vision and belief, Croke Park would not be the main headquarters for this organization and one of the finest stadiums worldwide.

Dineen is an emblematic figure in the early part of the GAA. He became President of the GAA in 1895 and filled the position until 1898 when he progressed to become the General Secretary of the association, a position he occupied until 1901. He was also a leading member of both the Fenian movement and the Land League. He is also known as one of the forgotten significant figures in the GAA and his memory and contribution was dismissed as the years went on.

As the renovations of Croke Park were coming to a close in 2006, the famous Hill 16 was renamed "The Dineen Hill 16" in honour of him. The Hill is a terrace on the railway end of Croke Park where Dublin GAA supporters usually gathered to support and cheer on their teams. It was built after the 1916 Rising and because Dineen died on 18 April 1916, this was an appropriate time.

== Early life ==
Dineen grew up in Ballylanders with his father, Nicholas Dineen. He came from a large family of 28 as his father remarried twice, having children with all three wives. Dineen attended National school in Ballylanders and after went to Rockwell College, in County Tipperary, after which he returned to Ballylanders. He was a very successful and influential person at a young age and accomplished a lot throughout his life. In his late teens, Dineen was one of Munster's greatest athletes and the fastest sprinter at that time. After retiring from athletics, Dineen first became an athletic handicapper, before being involved in the management of the G.A.A.

== Family life ==
Frank Brazil Dineen was born into a family home in Ballylanders, County Limerick with a family of 28. This was a result of Dineen's father, Nicholas Dineen's three marriages, and death of both his first and second wife, Dineen had many step-brothers, and sisters. Dineen attended Rockwell College in County Tipperary.

Dineen was involved in the Irish National Land League and the Fenian movement. His relatives also played a significant role in Irish Politics. Dineen's great grandnephew Frank Dineen, records in his Journal Article entitled The Complexities of Life: a Personal and Historical, his relations to his great grand uncle, and his family's involvement in Irish politics. Frank Dineen refers to Frank B. Dineen as an all-Ireland champion athlete, and his parents active involvement in the IRA, and Cumann na mBan activities. Dineen's relatives were caught and punished by the Irish state for their political opinions, and actions. One of his relatives was imprisoned in Limerick Prison as a result of his activities linked to the IRA in 1920. Another one of his relatives expressed her support for a free Ireland by removing an Irish flag from a British soldier's possession, which she was then fined for. As a result of Dineen's relatives' migration to England his grand-nephew served in the RAF from 1945 to 1948.

In December 2013, Liam O'Neill, President of the Gaelic Athletic Association from 2012 to 2015, paid tribute to Dineen's relatives. O'Neill made a speech for the 100th anniversary of Dineen's establishment, and donation of Croke Park to the GAA Committee, referring to Dineen's family members contributing participation in making Croke Park an emblematic symbol in GAA history. Despite maybe not having been aware at the time, O'Neill highlights how Dineen's decision to donate what was before the 14 acre city and suburban Racecourse to the GAA committee influenced his family's history.

== Career ==
Frank Dineen's sporting career began in athletics in the 1880s. He had a keen passion for the sport and excelled in sprinting. In the time he competed, Dineen was known as one of the best athletes in Munster and was thought to be the fastest sprinter in the province. In 1882 Dineen ran the 100-yard sprint in 10.2 seconds, which at the time was the Irish record. After his retirement from the sport, he then became a well-known athletic official and refereed many athletic competitions, before beginning his career in the Gaelic Athletic Association (GAA). Dineen also founded the Ballylanders GAA club in 1886. The club plays sports such as Gaelic football and hurling and is still around to this day.

Dineen began his career in the GAA in 1895. He began his role in the GAA when he took over as president from Peter J. He served as president for three years until 1898, and after that he began his role as general secretary of the association from 1898-1901. He became the first man to ever serve as both general secretary of the association and president of the GAA. and to this day he is still the only person to hold both positions. After his retirement from the GAA, Dineen went on to become a sportswriter and journalist for the Gaelic section of the Sport newspaper.

After serving his role as President and General Secretary of the Association, Dineen went on to purchase the Jones' Road Sports Ground for £3,250 on 17 December 1908. He bought the grounds in trust for the GAA as at the time, the GAA was unable to purchase the land itself. Dineen held the ground in trust for five years until the GAA was able to afford the grounds, and they purchased it in 1913. For the years in between 1908 and 1913, Frank Dineen oversaw the developments of the grounds, and paid for the renovations and upkeep of the property. Dineen remained involved in the development of Croke Park until his death in 1916.

The official Gaelic Athletic Association logo

== Later life and death ==
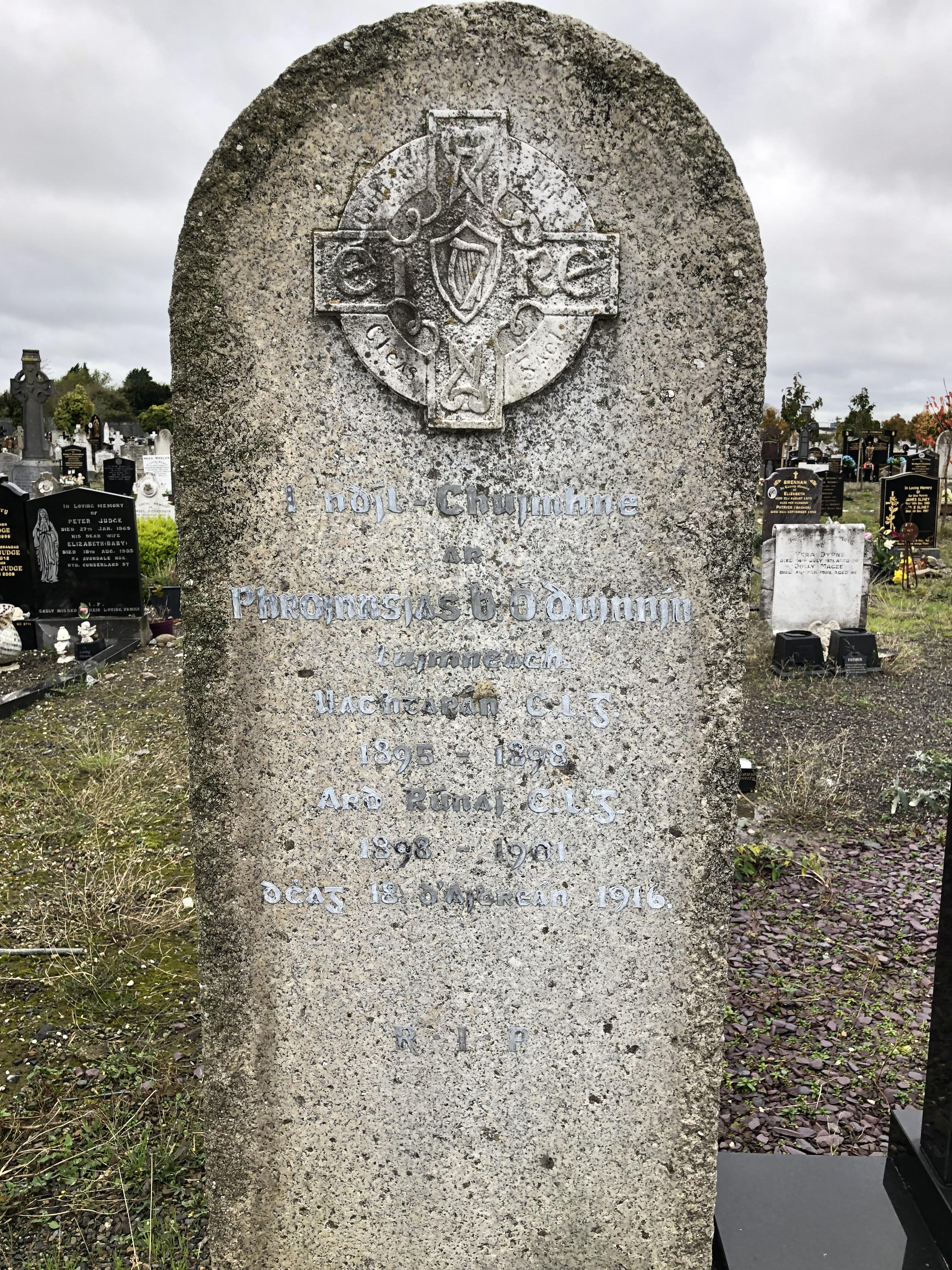
Frank Dineen's Gravestone located at Glasnevin Cemetery, County Dublin

Dineen's athletic career came to a sudden end due to ill health. However, this did not stop him from pursuing his love for GAA and sport. Upon Dineen's retirement, his passion for sport led him to become more involved in GAA, becoming an athletic referee. He refereed many important matches in Irish athletics and at that time many individuals considered him to be the most capable official in the country. Dineen had a keen interest in all aspects of the GAA, however, he had a particular interest in juvenile athletics. He is believed to have given all his well-deserved awards away at the local sports.

Dineen moved to Dublin in the late 1890s, where he became a sports journalist. He was particularly famous for his role in newspapers such as the Freeman's Journal, Telegraph, and Sport. In 1906, Dineen released the first ever Irish Athletic Record in the country, containing Irish, British and American records. Dineen had wished to produce another publication containing information on all great athletes of his time but unfortunately didn't live to see the day.

In 1908, Dineen bought a fourteen acre racecourse worth 3,250 pounds, with the idea of the GAA in mind. Improvements such as relaying the entire pitch took place after his purchase to cater for the Gaelic games and athletics. These improvements were financed by Dineen, however in 1910, he underwent financial difficulties and as a result sold four acres of the land to the Jesuits of Belvedere College, Dublin. Dineen sold the playing field to the GAA in 1913 for 3,500 pounds. Eleven years later, in 1924, the ground was transformed into a major stadium, currently known as Croke Park. Located in the heart of Dublin, this stadium still accommodates for major GAA events.

Dineen died on 18 April 1916, aged 54, exactly one week before The 1916 Easter Rising. He died due to a cerebral haemorrhage and was buried in Glasnevin Cemetery, County Dublin. Dineen's grave can be located specifically in the St. Paul's section of Glasnevin Cemetery across the Finglas Road. His headstone is written through the Irish language and states the years he served as President and Secretary of the GAA.

== Legacy ==
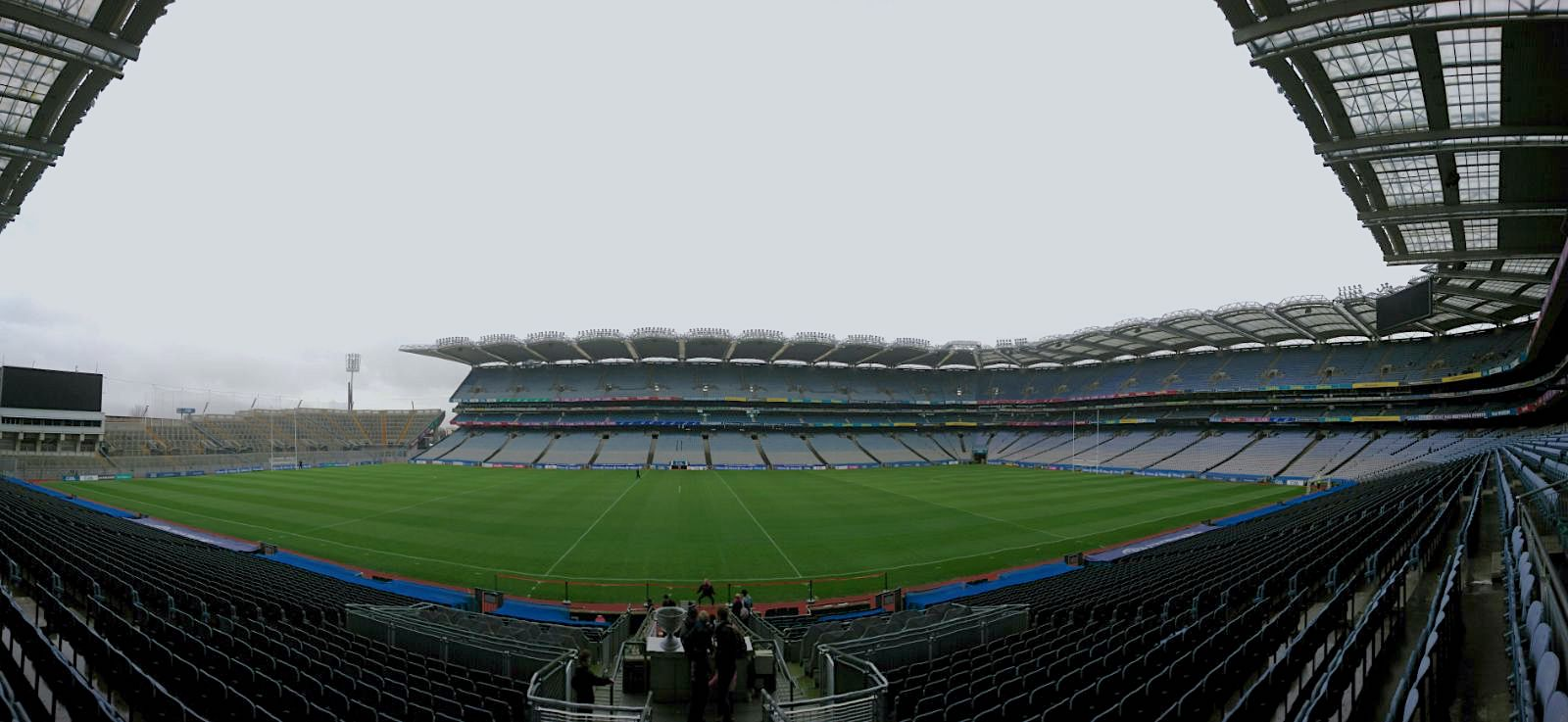
Panoramic of Croke Park, Dublin

Dineen's greater legacy is the acquisition, and subsequently donation to the GAA, of Croke Park, now the headquarters of the Gaelic Athletic Association (GAA) in Dublin, for which he was honoured and celebrated on different occasions during the past 10 years. In February 1970, a headstone over the grave of Dineen, in Glasnevin Cemetery, in Dublin, was unveiled by the then president of the GAA, Seamus O'Riain, with the presence of Dineen's family members and representatives from the GAA executive committee.

In April 2006, along with other sections of the stadium dedicated to prominent figures of the GAA, the terrace firstly built in 1917 and previously known as Hill 16, was officially re-named Dineen Hill 16 in Frank Dineen's honour. Dineen/Hill 16 Terrace now holds up to 13,000 people.

In 2009, the Shamrocks Ballylanders GAA Club honoured Frank Dineen, its founding member, with a two days long event, named "The Birth of Croke Park in the Ballyhoura Mountains", held in South East Limerick. RTÉ broadcaster and commentator Micheál Ó Muircheartaigh, Martinstown Historical Society and historians Larry Ryder, Tony O'Donoghue and Dr Cyril White, participated in the opening of the event. The festival consisted in a series of lectures, where historians recalled Dineen contributions to the GAA, followed by the unveiling of the specially commissioned commemorative plaque, dedicated to Dineen, by the president of the GAA Club, Criostóir Ó Cuana, on the gable wall of McDermott's pub and the Ballylanders Club. The Ballysanders's GAA Club also announced a collaboration with the country's famous GAA historian, Harry Greensmyth, and launched a 140 pages book about the Life and Times of Frank B Dineen.

In December 2013, in honour of the 100th anniversary of his donation and the establishment of Croke Park as the GAA headquarters, Dineen was once again celebrated, when framed copies of the original deeds for Croke Park were presented to Dineen's relatives and to representatives from the Shamrocks Ballylanders GAA Club. The deeds of the 14 acres on Jones Road in Northsides Dublin were originally acquired by Dineen in 1908, for £3.250 and consequently acquired by the GAA in 1913.

As today Frank Brazil Dineen is the only man who served as both President, between 1895 and 1898, and Secretary, between 1898 and 1901, of the GAA.

This article incorporates text available under the CC BY 3.0 license.

Sporting positions
Preceded by Peter Kelly	President of the Gaelic Athletic Association; 1895–1898	Succeeded by Michael Deering
