= Joseph Stuart =

Gaelic games administrator (1904–1980)

James Joseph Stuart, known as J. J. or Joe Stuart (9 June 1904 – 21 March 1980) was the 19th president of the Gaelic Athletic Association.

Born in Ogonnelloe, County Clare, he won two Fitzgibbon Cup medals with UCD and also hurled in Clare, Galway and Limerick.

He was a medical doctor and was Master of Dublin's Coombe Hospital from 1957 to 1963.

He served as vice-chairman of Dublin county committee for many years and in 1954 became the only non-Leinster man to chair the Leinster Council.

He was also a prominent hurling referee who took charge of the 1943 All-Ireland Senior Hurling Championship Final between Cork and Antrim.

Sporting positions
Preceded by Séamus McFerran	President of the Gaelic Athletic Association; 1958–1961	Succeeded by Aodh Ó Broin
