= Peter Kelly (sports administrator) =

Gaelic sports administrator (1847–1908)

Peter Kelly (1847 – 7 April 1908) was president of the Gaelic Athletic Association (GAA) in the late 1880s.

Kelly was born in Kilchreest and raised in Killeenadeema, Loughrea. He and a number of other men from the area, William J. Duffy, John P. McCarthy, John Sweeney, Loughrea; Michael Glennon, Kilchreest, asked Bishop Patrick Duggan to become the patron of the nascent GAA. Duggan declined citing his poor health, suggesting instead Archbishop Thomas Croke of Cashel. Kelly attended the foundation of the association at Thurles in November 1884. He served as umpire during the Loughrea hurling tournament of 1887, which was attended by over three thousand people. He was a member of the Irish Republican Brotherhood.

Sporting positions
Preceded by Maurice Davin	President of the Gaelic Athletic Association; 1889–1895	Succeeded by Frank Dineen
