= Seán McCarthy (Cork politician) =

Irish Fianna Fáil politician (1889–1974)

Teachta Dála
- In office April 1961 – April 1965
- Constituency: Cork Mid
- In office May 1954 – April 1961
- Constituency: Cork South
- In office May 1951 – May 1954
- Constituency: Cork Borough
- In office May 1944 – February 1948
- Constituency: Cork South-East

Personal details
- Born: 1889 Upton, County Cork, Ireland
- Died: 14 March 1974 (aged 84–85) Cork, Ireland
- Party: Fianna Fáil
- Education: De La Salle College Waterford
- Occupation: Teacher

Seán McCarthy (1889 – 14 March 1974) was an Irish Fianna Fáil politician. A teacher by profession, he was first elected to Dáil Éireann as a Fianna Fáil Teachta Dála (TD) for the Cork South-East constituency at the 1944 general election but lost his seat at the 1948 general election running in the Cork Borough constituency. He was re-elected for the Cork Borough constituency at the 1951 general election. McCarthy was elected from the Cork South constituency at the 1954 Irish general election and the 1957 Irish general election. The last time McCarthy was elected was to represent the Cork Mid constituency at the 1961 Irish general election.

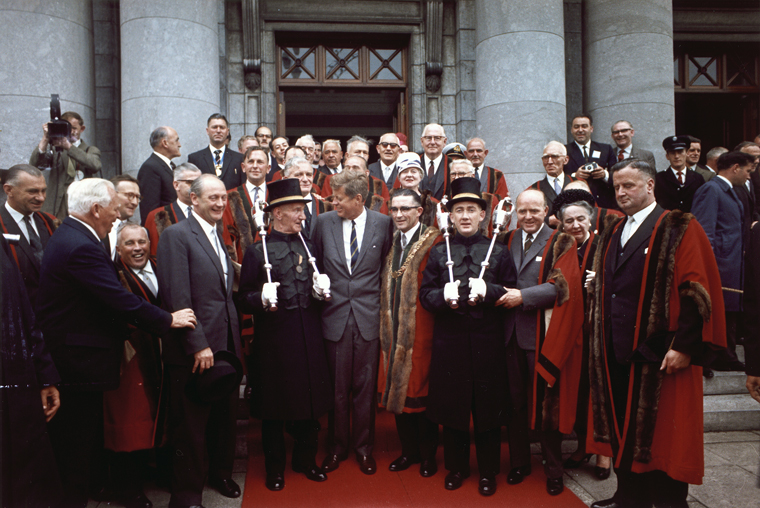
John F. Kennedy visits McCarthy while Lord Mayor of Cork, 1963

McCarthy also served as Lord Mayor of Cork on four occasions, from 1949 to 1951, 1958 to 1959, 1963 to 1964, and 1966 to 1967.

He was president of the Gaelic Athletic Association from 1932 to 1935.

Sporting positions
Preceded by Seán Ryan	President of the Gaelic Athletic Association; 1932–1935	Succeeded by Bob O'Keeffe
Civic offices
Preceded by Michael Sheehan	Lord Mayor of Cork; 1949–1951	Succeeded by Walter Furlong
Preceded by Valentine Jago	Lord Mayor of Cork; 1958–1959	Succeeded by Jane Dowdall
Preceded by Seán Casey	Lord Mayor of Cork; 1963–1964	Succeeded by Gus Healy
Preceded by Seán Casey	Lord Mayor of Cork; 1966–1967	Succeeded by Pearse Wyse

Dáil	Election	Deputy (Party)	Deputy (Party)	Deputy (Party)
9th	1937	Jeremiah Hurley (Lab)	Martin Corry (FF)	Brook Brasier (FG)
10th	1938	Jeremiah Hurley (Lab)	Martin Corry (FF)	Brook Brasier (FG)
11th	1943	Thomas Looney (Lab)	Martin Corry (FF)	William Broderick (FG)
12th	1944	Seán McCarthy (FF)	Martin Corry (FF)	William Broderick (FG)
13th	1948	Constituency abolished		

Dáil	Election	Deputy (Party)	Deputy (Party)	Deputy (Party)	Deputy (Party)	Deputy (Party)
2nd	1921	Liam de Róiste (SF)	Mary MacSwiney (SF)	Donal O'Callaghan (SF)	J. J. Walsh (SF)	4 seats 1921–1923
3rd	1922	Liam de Róiste (PT-SF)	Mary MacSwiney (AT-SF)	Robert Day (Lab)	J. J. Walsh (PT-SF)	4 seats 1921–1923
4th	1923	Richard Beamish (Ind.)	Mary MacSwiney (Rep)	Andrew O'Shaughnessy (Ind.)	J. J. Walsh (CnaG)	Alfred O'Rahilly (CnaG)
4th	1924 by-election	Richard Beamish (Ind.)	Mary MacSwiney (Rep)	Andrew O'Shaughnessy (Ind.)	J. J. Walsh (CnaG)	Michael Egan (CnaG)
5th	1927 (Jun)	John Horgan (NL)	Seán French (FF)	Richard Anthony (Lab)	J. J. Walsh (CnaG)	Barry Egan (CnaG)
6th	1927 (Sep)	W. T. Cosgrave (CnaG)	Seán French (FF)	Richard Anthony (Lab)	Hugo Flinn (FF)	Barry Egan (CnaG)
7th	1932	W. T. Cosgrave (CnaG)	Thomas Dowdall (FF)	Richard Anthony (Ind.)	Hugo Flinn (FF)	William Desmond (CnaG)
8th	1933	W. T. Cosgrave (CnaG)	Thomas Dowdall (FF)	Richard Anthony (Ind.)	Hugo Flinn (FF)	William Desmond (CnaG)
9th	1937	W. T. Cosgrave (FG)	Thomas Dowdall (FF)	Richard Anthony (Ind.)	Hugo Flinn (FF)	4 seats 1937–1948
10th	1938	W. T. Cosgrave (FG)	Thomas Dowdall (FF)	James Hickey (Lab)	Hugo Flinn (FF)	4 seats 1937–1948
11th	1943	W. T. Cosgrave (FG)	Frank Daly (FF)	Richard Anthony (Ind.)	Séamus Fitzgerald (FF)	4 seats 1937–1948
12th	1944	William Dwyer (Ind.)	Frank Daly (FF)	Richard Anthony (Ind.)	Walter Furlong (FF)	4 seats 1937–1948
12th	1946 by-election	Patrick McGrath (FF)	Frank Daly (FF)	Richard Anthony (Ind.)	Walter Furlong (FF)	4 seats 1937–1948
13th	1948	Patrick McGrath (FF)	Michael Sheehan (Ind.)	James Hickey (NLP)	Jack Lynch (FF)	Thomas F. O'Higgins (FG)
14th	1951	Patrick McGrath (FF)	Seán McCarthy (FF)	James Hickey (Lab)	Jack Lynch (FF)	Thomas F. O'Higgins (FG)
14th	1954 by-election	Patrick McGrath (FF)	Seán McCarthy (FF)	James Hickey (Lab)	Jack Lynch (FF)	Stephen Barrett (FG)
15th	1954	Patrick McGrath (FF)	Anthony Barry (FG)	Seán Casey (Lab)	Jack Lynch (FF)	Stephen Barrett (FG)
15th	1956 by-election	John Galvin (FF)	Anthony Barry (FG)	Seán Casey (Lab)	Jack Lynch (FF)	Stephen Barrett (FG)
16th	1957	John Galvin (FF)	Gus Healy (FF)	Seán Casey (Lab)	Jack Lynch (FF)	Stephen Barrett (FG)
17th	1961	John Galvin (FF)	Anthony Barry (FG)	Seán Casey (Lab)	Jack Lynch (FF)	Stephen Barrett (FG)
17th	1964 by-election	Sheila Galvin (FF)	Anthony Barry (FG)	Seán Casey (Lab)	Jack Lynch (FF)	Stephen Barrett (FG)
18th	1965	Gus Healy (FF)	Pearse Wyse (FF)	Seán Casey (Lab)	Jack Lynch (FF)	Stephen Barrett (FG)
18th	1967 by-election	Gus Healy (FF)	Pearse Wyse (FF)	Seán French (FF)	Jack Lynch (FF)	Stephen Barrett (FG)
19th	1969	Constituency abolished. See Cork City North-West and Cork City South-East				

Dáil	Election	Deputy (Party)	Deputy (Party)	Deputy (Party)
13th	1948	Dan Desmond (Lab)	Seán Buckley (FF)	Patrick Lehane (CnaT)
14th	1951	Dan Desmond (Lab)	Seán Buckley (FF)	Patrick Lehane (Ind.)
15th	1954	Dan Desmond (Lab)	Seán McCarthy (FF)	Tadhg Manley (FG)
16th	1957	Dan Desmond (Lab)	Seán McCarthy (FF)	Tadhg Manley (FG)
17th	1961	Constituency abolished		

Dáil	Election	Deputy (Party)	Deputy (Party)	Deputy (Party)	Deputy (Party)	Deputy (Party)
17th	1961	Dan Desmond (Lab)	Seán McCarthy (FF)	Con Meaney (FF)	Denis J. O'Sullivan (FG)	4 seats 1961–1977
17th	1965 by-election	Eileen Desmond (Lab)	Seán McCarthy (FF)	Con Meaney (FF)	Denis J. O'Sullivan (FG)	4 seats 1961–1977
18th	1965	Eileen Desmond (Lab)	Flor Crowley (FF)	Thomas Meaney (FF)	Donal Creed (FG)	4 seats 1961–1977
19th	1969	Philip Burton (FG)	Paddy Forde (FF)	Thomas Meaney (FF)	Donal Creed (FG)	4 seats 1961–1977
19th	1972 by-election	Philip Burton (FG)	Gene Fitzgerald (FF)	Thomas Meaney (FF)	Donal Creed (FG)	4 seats 1961–1977
20th	1973	Eileen Desmond (Lab)	Gene Fitzgerald (FF)	Thomas Meaney (FF)	Donal Creed (FG)	4 seats 1961–1977
21st	1977	Eileen Desmond (Lab)	Gene Fitzgerald (FF)	Thomas Meaney (FF)	Donal Creed (FG)	Barry Cogan (FF)
22nd	1981	Constituency abolished. See Cork North-Central and Cork South-Central				
