= Seán McCague =

Gaelic games administrator (1945 – 2022)

Seán McCague (1944 or 1945 – 24 November 2022) was an Irish Gaelic games administrator, footballer, referee and manager who served as the 33rd president of the Gaelic Athletic Association (2000–2003). He became the first Monaghan man to hold that office.

== Career ==
McCague was born in Scotstown, County Monaghan. He played football at junior level there. However, he won a Monaghan Senior Football Championship with his club (Scotstown) in 1974. An injury to his back ended his playing career prematurely.

He managed the Monaghan senior football team from the late 1970s. He managed his county team to the 1979 Ulster Senior Football Championship (SFC) title and then led it to two further Ulster SFC titles, as well as the National Football League title in 1985. The 1979 title win was Monaghan's first for 41 years. He served as Ireland assistant manager under Eugene McGee for the 1987 and 1990 International Rules Series. He was also a referee.

Mc Cague was also involved in administration as early as the mind 1970"s when he served as joint County Secretary with Francie Mc Atavie from Ballybay Pearse Brothers. As GAA president he is mostly remembered for the removal of Rule 21 in November 2001. Rule 21 banned members of the British security forces (who were an unwelcome force for most GAA fans) from playing Gaelic games. The rule was abolished despite the opposition of five of the six northern counties (Antrim, Armagh, Derry, Fermanagh and Tyrone). At the annual 2001 GAA Congress, McCague convinced Taoiseach Bertie Ahern to pledge €76 million towards the redevelopment of Croke Park. This amount was later reduced to €38 million.

== Personal life ==
McCague was married to Bernie (née Connolly, d. 2024) with five daughters Paula, Nuala, Martha, Freda and Emma. He qualified as an NT National School Teacher at St Patrick's College, Drumcondra, after attending the Preparatatory College, Coláiste Íosagáin, Baile Bhúirne. He taught in Scoil Mhuire St Mary's Boys' National School in Monaghan Town before becoming principal of Urbleshanny NS in 1977, he returned to St Mary's in 1981. He died on 24 November 2022, at the age of 77.

Gaelic games
Preceded by Joe McDonagh	President of the Gaelic Athletic Association; 2000–2003	Succeeded by Seán Kelly
