= Mick Loftus =

Gaelic games administrator (1929–2023)

Personal information
- Native name: Mícheál Ó Lochláin (Irish)
- Born: 9 August 1929 Kiltoom, County Roscommon, Ireland
- Died: 22 April 2023 (aged 93)
- Occupation: Medical doctor

Sport
- Sport: Gaelic football
- Position: Left corner-forward
Club
- Years: Club
- Crossmolina
Club titles
- Mayo titles: 1
College
- Years: College
- University College Galway
College titles
- Sigerson titles: 2
Inter-county*
Years	County	Apps (scores)
1949–1953	Mayo	1 (0-01)
Inter-county titles
- Connacht titles: 0
- All-Irelands: 1
- NFL: 0
- *Inter County team apps and scores correct as of 21:57, 7 February 2018.

Michael Loftus (9 August 1929 – 22 April 2023) was an Irish Gaelic footballer, referee and Gaelic games administrator. His league and championship career at senior level with the Mayo county team lasted four seasons from 1949 until 1953.

== Early life ==
Loftus first played competitive Gaelic football with St Muredach's College in Ballina. Loftus simultaneously came to prominence with the Crossmolina club at underage levels, before later winning a county senior championship medal with the senior team in 1949. He studied at University College Galway, where he played for the university football team and won three Sigerson Cup medals.

Loftus made his debut on the inter-county scene at the age of seventeen when he was selected for the Mayo minor team. He enjoyed one championship season with the minor team, however, he ended the year as an All-Ireland runner-up. Loftus subsequently joined the Mayo junior team, winning All-Ireland medals in 1950 and in 1957 as captain. By this stage he had also joined the Mayo senior team, making his debut during the 1949-50 league. Over the course of the next four years, Loftus played on a number of occasions and was a non-playing substitute in the 1951 All-Ireland final, for which he was retrospectively awarded a winner's medal decades later.

== GAA administrator ==
In retirement from playing, Loftus became a referee at club and county level. He took charge of the All-Ireland finals in 1965 and 1968.

Loftus also served in an administrative capacity with the Gaelic Athletic Association. He was chairman of the Connacht Council and the Centenary Committee before serving as president of the GAA from 1985 until 1988.

Loftus was conferred with a Legum Doctor (honoris causa) by NUI Galway on 20 February 2015.

== Death and legacy ==
Loftus died on 22 April 2023, at the age of 93.

A sculpture of Loftus was built in his hometown of Crossmolina in honour of him in 2024. At the time of his death, he was the last surviving member of the 1951 winning team.

== Honours ==
University College Galway

- Sigerson Cup (2): 1949, 1951

Crossmolina

- Mayo Senior Football Championship (1): 1949

Mayo

- All-Ireland Senior Football Championship (1): 1951
- All-Ireland Junior Football Championship (2): 1950, 1957
- Connacht Junior Football Championship (2): 1950, 1957

Sporting positions
Preceded by Paddy Buggy	President of the Gaelic Athletic Association; 1985–1988	Succeeded by John Dowling
