= Patrick Breen (sports administrator) =

Gaelic games administrator

President of the Gaelic Athletic Association
- In office 1924-1926

Personal details
- Born: Carrig-on-Bannow, County Wexford, Ireland
- Education: St Patrick's College, Dublin
- Occupation: Sports administrator
Association football career
Senior career*
Years	Team	Apps	(Gls)
- Bray Emmets GAA
1904-1914	Wexford county football team		
Mid-1910s	Dublin county football team		
- * Club domestic league appearances and goals

Patrick Breen was a sports administrator who served as the eighth president of the Gaelic Athletic Association (1924–1926). In his youth, Breen competed in both football and hurling.

As a football player, Breen won two All-Ireland senior medals, one with Dublin in 1902, one with Wexford in 1914. He held a variety of administrative positions at all levels. At county level, he served as secretary and chairman; he was a member of Leinster council for 25 years, serving as its chairman from 1922 to 1923. In 1922, Breen came to prominence at Congress when he spoke out against "the Ban" (Rule 27, which forbade the playing or promotion of foreign games).

Sporting positions
Preceded by Daniel McCarthy	President of the Gaelic Athletic Association; 1924–1926	Succeeded by Liam Clifford
