= President of the Gaelic Athletic Association =

Head of the Gaelic Athletic Association

- Uachtarán
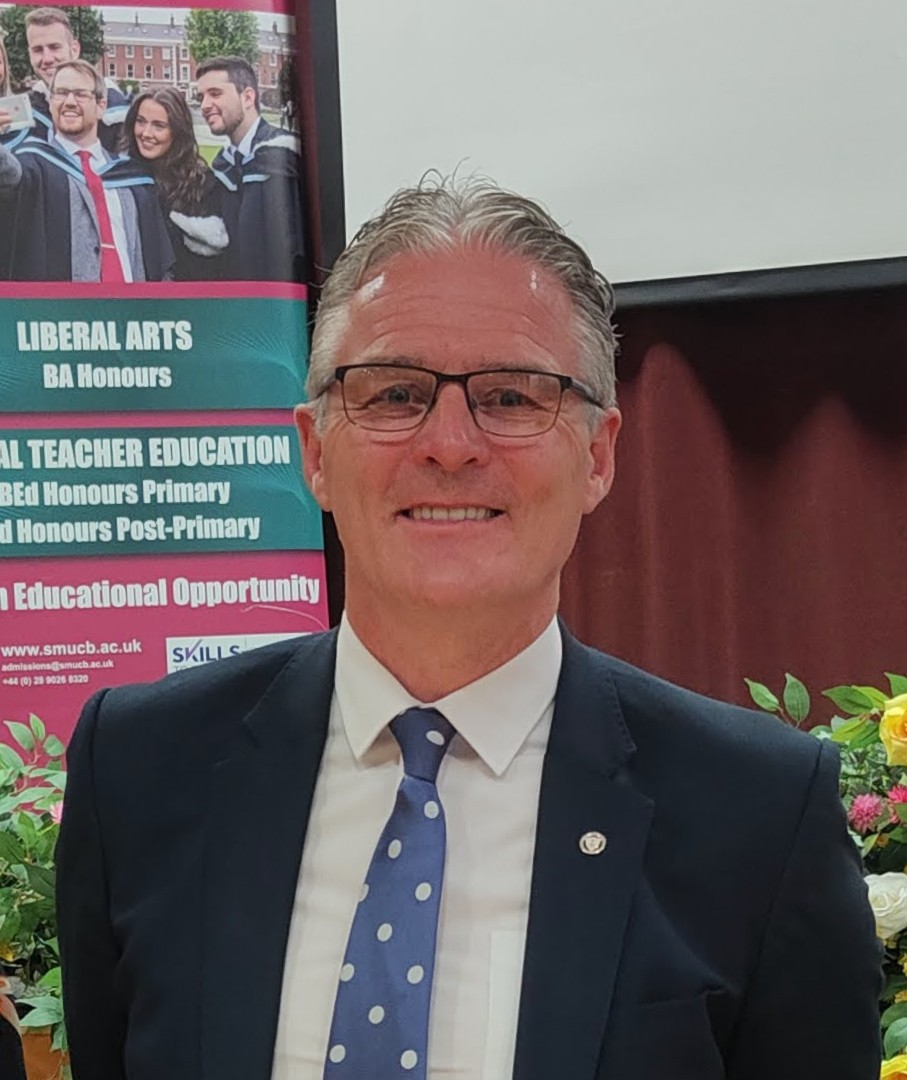
- Incumbent; Jarlath Burns since 24 February 2024
- Gaelic Athletic Association Congress
- Member of: The Management Committee
- Seat: Croke Park, Dublin, Ireland
- Appointer: Elected by the Gaelic Athletic Association Congress
- Term length: Term of three years
- Formation: 1884
- First holder: Maurice Davin
- Website: GAA's Uachtarán Webpage

The president of the Gaelic Athletic Association (Irish: Uachtarán Cumann Lúthchleas Gael) is the head of the Gaelic Athletic Association (GAA).

The president holds office for three years. The role of president has existed since the foundation of the GAA. The president of the GAA is one of the leading figures in civil society in Ireland, as the association has around one million members and is present in every parish in the country. The role of president involves representing the GAA in Ireland and across the world. Former presidents of the GAA have a key role within the GAA, sitting on the motions committee which rules if motions to the annual Congress are in order. They also have become known for other roles such as Seán Kelly, who was later elected as an MEP for the South constituency.

The president travels across Ireland and the world to promote the organisation and attend games; former President Nickey Brennan travelled 160,000 miles in Ireland alone during his three years as president, and visited Great Britain, Europe, North America, Asia, Australia and the Middle East on several occasions, meeting dignitaries such as New York City mayor Michael Bloomberg along the way.

Jarlath Burns assumed office as president on 24 February 2024.

== Selection ==
The president is elected at Annual Congress by secret ballot. They then serve as Uachtarán-Tofa for one year.

== History ==
In 1981, John Kerry O'Donnell became the first overseas member of the GAA to run for president.

In 2020, Larry McCarthy became the first overseas member of the GAA to be elected as president.

== List of presidents of the Gaelic Athletic Association ==
No.	Portrait	Name (birth–death)	Name in Irish	Term of office		County
1.		Maurice Davin (29 June 1842 – 27 January 1927)	Muiris Ó Daimhín	1884	1887	Tipperary
2.		Edward Bennet (1845 – 24 November 1910)	Éamonn Mac Beinéid	1887	1888	Clare
—N/a		Maurice Davin (29 June 1842 – 27 January 1927) (2nd term)	Muiris Ó Daimhín	1888	1889	Tipperary
3.		Peter Kelly (1847 – 7 April 1908)	Peadar Ó Ceallaigh	1889	1895	Galway
4.		Frank Dineen (1862 – 18 April 1916)	Proinsias Ó Duinnín	1895	1898	Limerick
5.		Michael Deering (1858 – 25 March 1901)		1898	1901	Cork
6.		James Nowlan (1862 – June 1924)	Séamus Ó Nualláin	1901	1921	Kilkenny
7.		Daniel McCarthy (22 January 1883 – 2 March 1957)	Dónal Mac Cárthaigh	1921	1924	Dublin
8.		Patrick Breen (? – ?)	Pádraig Ó Braoin	1924	1926	Wexford
9.		Liam Clifford (27 June 1876 – 24 February 1949)	Liam Mac Rifeartaigh	1926	1928	Limerick
10.		Seán Ryan (1895 – 7 March 1963)	Seán Ó Riain	1928	1932	Tipperary
11.		Seán McCarthy (1889 – 14 March 1974)	Seán Mac Cárthaigh	1932	1935	Cork
12.		Bob O'Keeffe (16 August 1880 – 1949)	Roibeard Ó Caoimh	1935	1938	Laois
13.		Pádraig MacNamee (8 September 1896 - 28 March 1975)	Pádraig Mac Con Midhe	1938	1943	Antrim
14.		Séamus Gardiner (1894 – 10 January 1976)	Séamas Gairnéir	1943	1946	Clare
15.		Daniel O'Rourke (? – 4 August 1968)	Dónal Ó Ruairc	1946	1949	Roscommon
16.		Michael Kehoe (22 June 1899 – 8 January 1977)	Mícheál Mac Eochaidh	1949	1952	Wexford
17.		Vincent O'Donoghue (18 May 1900 – 29 May 1972)	Uinseann Ó Donnchú	1952	1955	Galway
18.		Séamus McFerran (10 January 1916 – 31 August 1978)	Séamus Mac Mhearáin	1955	1958	Antrim
19.		Joseph Stuart (9 June 1904 – 21 March 1980)	Seosamh Stíobhard	1958	1961	Clare
20.		Aodh Ó Broin (? – 3 July 1993)	Aodh Ó Broin	1961	1964	Wicklow
21.		Alf Murray (25 December 1915 – 12 March 1999)	Alf Ó Muirí	1964	1967	Armagh
22.		Séamus Ó Riain (2 April 1916 – 27 January 2007)	Séamus Ó Riain	1967	1970	Tipperary
23.		Pat Fanning (25 August 1918 – 14 March 2010)	Pádraig Ó Fainín	1970	1973	Waterford
24.		Donal Keenan (1919 – 19 September 1990)	Donal Ó Cianáin	1973	1976	Roscommon
25.		Con Murphy (28 October 1922 – 29 April 2007)	Conchur Ó Murchú	1976	1979	Cork
26.		Paddy McFlynn (9 May 1918 – 24 September 2013)	Pádraig Mac Floinn	1979	1982	Down
27.		Paddy Buggy (15 March 1929 – 15 May 2013)	Páidí Ó Bogaigh	1982	1985	Kilkenny
28.		Dr Mick Loftus (9 August 1929 - 22 April 2023)	Micheál Ó Lochláin	1985	1988	Mayo
29.		John Dowling (18 November 1931 – 9 February 2002)	Seán Ó Dúllaing	1988	1991	Offaly
30.		Peter Quinn (born 1943)	Peadar Ó Coinn	1991	1994	Fermanagh
31.		Jack Boothman (12 October 1935 – 10 May 2016)	Seáinín Bútman	1994	1997	Wicklow
32.		Joe McDonagh (1953 – 20 May 2016)	Seosamh Mac Donnchadha	1997	2000	Galway
33.		Seán McCague (1944 or 1945 – 24 November 2022)	Seán Mac Thaidhg	2000	2003	Monaghan
34.		Seán Kelly (born 26 April 1952)	Seán Ó Ceallaigh	2003	2006	Kerry
35.		Nickey Brennan (born 3 December 1953)	Nioclás Ó Braonáin	2006	2009	Kilkenny
36.		Christy Cooney (born 1952)	Críostóir Ó Cuana	2009	2012	Cork
37.		Liam O'Neill (August 1955 – 4 August 2026)	Liam Ó Néill	2012	2015	Laois
38.		Aogán Ó Fearghail (born 1959)	Aogán Ó Fearghail	2015	2018	Cavan
39.		John Horan (born 1958)	Seán Ó hÓráin	2018	2021	Dublin
40		Larry McCarthy (born 1954)	Labhrás Mac Carthaigh	2021	2024	New York
41		Jarlath Burns	Iarlaith Ó Broin	2024	2027	Armagh

== President's Awards ==
Seán Kelly introduced the President's Awards.

They are awarded annually.

== Player–presidents ==
Donal Keenan, Con Murphy, Paddy Buggy, Mick Loftus, Joe McDonagh and Nickey Brennan all won All-Ireland medals as players before becoming president.

John Dowling was with the Tullamore club as a dual player, but at inter-county level his involvement was more as a referee, officiating in five All-Ireland finals.

Peter Quinn played for Teemore in Fermanagh, winning a Junior Football Championship. However, his only involvement with the Fermanagh seniors was in the Dr Lagan Cup and some challenge matches; he was never even included in a championship panel.

Seán McCague played junior club football for most of the time but at inter-county level he was a manager.

Jack Boothman played for the Blessington club.

Liam O'Neill played with the Trumera club at junior level, though featured at senior level on hurling teams while studying at St Pat's and UCD.

Aogán Ó Fearghail played locally for 12 years but won no championship games.

John Horan played for Na Fianna in his late twenties.

The highlight of Larry McCarthy's playing career was winning the 1977–78 All-Ireland Senior Club Football Championship with Thomond College.

Jarlath Burns made his debut with the Armagh senior team in 1987. Over the course of the following thirteen seasons he had little success; however, the highlight of his career was captaining Armagh to an Ulster title in 1999. Burns also won two McKenna Cup titles.

== Statistics ==
- ? was the oldest president to enter office, aged ?.
- ? was the oldest president to leave office, aged ?.
- Seán Ryan was the youngest president to enter office, aged ?.
- ? was the youngest president to leave office, aged ?.
- ?, who died in office, had the shortest presidency of ? days.
- ?, who resigned, served for ? days.
- Maurice Davin uniquely served for two terms.
- James Nowlan is the longest-serving.
- Pat Fanning was the former president to have survived the longest after serving.
- Michael Deering was the only president to die in office.
- Only twice have there been consecutive presidents from the same province: Joseph Stuart (1958) and Aodh Ó Broin (1961) of Leinster and Séamus Ó Riain (1967) and Pat Fanning (1970) of Munster.
- Leinster had three consecutive presidents from different counties (Kilkenny, Dublin, Wexford) between 1901 and 1926.
- Munster then had three consecutive presidents from different counties (Limerick, Tipperary, Cork) between 1926 and 1935.
- Five of the seven Ulster presidents came from north of the border. The other two were Seán McCague (Monaghan) and Aogán Ó Fearghail (Cavan).

By county

- The following counties have had multiple presidents:

#	County	Presidents
4	Cork	Christy Cooney, Michael Deering, Seán McCarthy, Con Murphy
3	Clare	Edward Bennet, Séamus Gardiner, Joseph Stuart
3	Galway	Peter Kelly, Joe McDonagh, Vincent O'Donoghue
3	Kilkenny	Nickey Brennan, Paddy Buggy, James Nowlan
3	Tipperary	Maurice Davin, Séamus Ó Riain, Seán Ryan
2	Antrim	Séamus McFerran, Pádraig MacNamee
2	Armagh	Alf Murray, Jarlath Burns
2	Dublin	John Horan, Daniel McCarthy
2	Laois	Bob O'Keeffe, Liam O'Neill
2	Limerick	Liam Clifford, Frank Dineen
2	Roscommon	Donal Keenan, Dan O'Rourke
2	Wicklow	Jack Boothman, Aodh Ó Broin

By province

	Province	Presidents	Top county	Most recent
1	Munster	14	Cork (4)	Christy Cooney (Cork)
2	Leinster	12	Kilkenny (3)	John Horan (Dublin)
3	Ulster	8	Antrim/Armagh (2)	Jarlath Burns (Armagh)
4	Connacht	6	Galway (3)	Joe McDonagh (Galway)
5	Overseas	1	New York (1)	Larry McCarthy (New York)
