= Paddy Buggy =

Irish hurler

Personal information
- Native name: Páidí Ó Bogaigh (Irish)
- Born: 15 March 1929 Slieverue, County Kilkenny, Ireland
- Died: 15 May 2013 (aged 84) Ferrybank, County Waterford, Ireland
- Occupation: Clerical worker
- Height: 5 ft 9 in (175 cm)

Sport
- Sport: Hurling
- Position: Right wing-back
Club
- Years: Club
- Slieverue
Club titles
- Kilkenny titles: 1
Inter-county
- Years: County
- 1949–1960: Kilkenny
Inter-county titles
- Leinster titles: 5
- All-Irelands: 1

Paddy Buggy (15 March 1929 – 15 May 2013) was an Irish sportsperson. He played hurling with his local club Slieverue and was a member of the Kilkenny senior inter-county team from 1949 until 1960. Buggy later served as the 27th president of the Gaelic Athletic Association from 1982 until 1985.

== Playing career ==
=== Club ===
Born in Slieverue, County Kilkenny, Buggy played his club hurling with his local Slieverue club. He won one senior county title with the club in 1954.

=== Inter-county ===
Buggy first came to prominence on the inter-county scene as a member of the Kilkenny senior team in the late 1940s. He made his championship debut in 1949 and won his first Leinster the following year in 1950. Kilkenny later played Tipperary in an unexciting final which Tipp won by a point. Three years later in 1953 Buggy won a second Leinster medal; however, Kilkenny were later defeated by Galway in the All-Ireland semi-final. In 1957 Buggy won his third Leinster title before lining out in his second All-Ireland final. Waterford provided the opposition on that occasion in an exciting championship decider. Waterford led by six points with fifteen minutes to go, however, Kilkenny stormed back with two quick goals to win the game by a point giving Buggy an All-Ireland medal. The following year he won a fourth Leinster title before being later beaten by Tipperary in the All-Ireland semi-final. In 1959 Buggy won his fifth Leinster title before lining out in a third All-Ireland final. Once again Waterford provided the opposition, however, the game ended in a draw. In the replay it was the Déise who emerged victorious by seven points. Buggy retired from inter-county hurling in 1960.

=== Provincial ===
Buggy also won a Railway Cup medal with Leinster in 1954.

== Administrative roles ==
Buggy began his administrative career with the Slieverue club at the age of 18 when he served as secretary of the minor section of the club. He later filled every available administrative position on the club's committee. As well as becoming a club administrator, Buggy was also elected as the Slieverue representative on the Kilkenny Southern Board in 1947, before being elected as one of the club's delegates to the Kilkenny County Board in 1950. He remained on the board until 1955 when he was elected to the Leinster Council. Buggy rose to the position of vice-chairman before gaining promotion to the position of chairman between 1978 and 1980.

=== GAA presidency ===
Buggy was officially nominated as the Kilkenny candidate for president of the GAA in January 1981. He also received the backing of Offaly and Wicklow. In the election in Killarney on 29 March 1981, he defeated Mick Loftus, the chairman of the Connacht Council, by 145 votes to 136 and was elected on the fifth count. As president he presided over the centenary celebrations of the organisation in 1984 and was generally regarded as an able administrator, particularly close to the grass-root membership.

== Personal life ==
Buggy also managed the Leinster team to five consecutive Railway Cup victories from 1971 until 1975.

Very proud of his native roots, Buggy was vociferous in the campaign to keep Slieverue in County Kilkenny amid moves to have it incorporated into the expanding City of Waterford as a suburb on the northern bank of the river Suir.

He died on 15 May 2013, aged 84.

Sporting positions
Preceded by Dan Kennedy	Kilkenny Senior Hurling Captain; 1955–1956	Succeeded by Mickey Kelly
Preceded by Jimmy Roche	Chairman of the Leinster Council; 1978–1980	Succeeded by John Dowling
Preceded by Pádraig Mac Floinn	President of the Gaelic Athletic Association; 1982–1985	Succeeded by Mick Loftus
Preceded by Tommy Murphy	Chairman of the Kilkenny County Board; 1990	Succeeded by Nickey Brennan
