= 1943 All-Ireland Senior Hurling Championship final =

1943 All-Ireland Senior Hurling Final
- Event: 1943 All-Ireland Senior Hurling Championship
Cork	Antrim
5–16	0–4
- Date: 5 September 1943
- Venue: Croke Park, Dublin
- Referee: J. J. Stuart (Dublin)
- Attendance: 48,843

The 1943 All-Ireland Senior Hurling Championship Final was the 56th All-Ireland Final and the culmination of the 1943 All-Ireland Senior Hurling Championship, an inter-county hurling tournament for the top teams in Ireland. The match was held at Croke Park, Dublin, on 5 September 1943, between Cork and Antrim. The Ulster champions lost to their Munster opponents on a score line of 5–16 to 0–4.

== Match details ==
5 September 1944
15:30 IST

Cork	5–16 – 0-4	Antrim

Croke Park, Dublin
Attendance: 48,843
Referee: J. J. Stuart (Dublin)

Cork	Antrim

Cork Team 1 Tom Mulcahy 2 Willie Murphy 3 Batt Thornhill 4 Con Murphy 5 Alan Lotty 6 Din Joe Buckley 7 Jim Young 8 Jack Lynch 9 Fr Con Cottrell 10 Sean Condon 11 Christy Ring 12 Mick Kenefick 13 John Quirke 14 Ted O'Sullivan 15 Micka Brennan Substitutes Paddy O'Donovan for Sean Condon Bernie Murphy for Ted O'Sullivan Unused Substitutes Jackie O'Sullivan, Paddy Hayes, Paddy Hitler Healy Trainer Jim Tough Barry Selectors Sean Og Murphy, Sean McCarthy, William Bowler Walsh, Dinny Barry Murphy, Dan Coughlan
