= Donal Keenan =

Irish sports administrator (1919–1990)

Personal information
- Native name: Dónall Ó Cianáin (Irish)
- Born: 10 March 1919 Elphin, County Roscommon, Ireland
- Died: 19 September 1990 (aged 71) Cork, Ireland
- Occupation: Medical doctor

Sport
- Sport: Gaelic football
- Position: Left wing-forward
Club
- Years: Club
- Elphin
Club titles
- Roscommon titles: 2
College
- Years: College
- 1940-1947: University College Dublin
College titles
- Sigerson titles: 2
Inter-county
- Years: County
- 1939-1951: Roscommon
Inter-county titles
- Connacht titles: 4
- All-Irelands: 2
- NFL: 0

Daniel Patrick Keenan (10 March 1919 – 19 September 1990) was an Irish Gaelic games administrator, Gaelic football coach, selector and former player. He was the president of the Gaelic Athletic Association from 1973 until 1976.

Born in Elphin, County Roscommon, Keenan was introduced to Gaelic football in his youth. At club level he first lined out as a minor with Elphin. In a distinguished career spanning three decades, Keenan won two championship medals with Elphin, having earlier won a championship medal with University College Dublin.

Keenan made his debut on the inter-county scene when he first linked up with the Roscommon junior team. An All-Ireland medallist in this grade, Keenan later made his senior football debut. He went on to play a key role for Roscommon during a hugely successful era, and won two All-Ireland medals and four Connacht medals. He was an All-Ireland runner-up on one occasion.

As a member of the Connacht inter-provincial team on six consecutive occasions, Keenan never won a Railway Cup medal. He retired from inter-county football following the conclusion of the 1951 championship.

In retirement from playing Keenan became involved in team management and coaching. He served on the management team of the Roscommon seniors for almost two decades, winning two Connacht titles.

In Gaelic games administration Keenan served as Roscommon County Board chairman for a period from 1958 and was chairman of the Connacht Council from 1970 until his election as the 24th president of the GAA in 1973.

== Honours ==
Elphin

- Roscommon Senior Football Championship (2): 1950, 1951

University College Dublin

- Sigerson Cup (1): 1945, 1946
- Dublin Senior Football Championship (1): 1945 (c)

Roscommon

- All-Ireland Senior Football Championship (2): 1943, 1944
- Connacht Senior Football Championship (4): 1943, 1944, 1946, 1947
- All-Ireland Junior Football Championship (1): 1940
- Connacht Junior Football Championship (1): 1940

Sporting positions
| Preceded by Pat Fanning | President of the Gaelic Athletic Association; 1973–1976 | Succeeded by Con Murphy |
