= Roscommon (disambiguation) =

Roscommon is a town in Ireland.

Roscommon may also refer to:

== Other places ==
- County Roscommon, in Ireland
- Roscommon, Michigan, village in the United States
- Roscommon County, Michigan, county in the United States
- Roscommon Township, Michigan, township in the United States

== Constituencies ==
- Roscommon (Parliament of Ireland constituency) before 1801
- County Roscommon (Parliament of Ireland constituency) before 1801
- County Roscommon (UK Parliament constituency)
- North Roscommon
- South Roscommon
- Leitrim–Roscommon North
- Mayo South–Roscommon South
- Roscommon (Dáil constituency)
- Roscommon–Leitrim
- Roscommon (Dáil constituency)
- Longford–Roscommon
- Roscommon–South Leitrim

== Institutions ==
- Roscommon railway station, Ireland
- Roscommon County - Blodgett Memorial Airport, Michigan, United States
- Roscommon High School, in Roscommon, Michigan
- Roscommon School, Primary School in Manurewa, a suburb of Manukau City, Auckland Region, New Zealand
- Roscommon Zoo, Michigan

== Other ==
- Roscommon GAA, the Gaelic Athletic Association board for County Roscommon, Ireland
- Earl of Roscommon, title in the Peerage of Ireland 1622–1850
