= Kilfaul =

Townland in Portroyal, County Mayo, Ireland

Coordinates: 53°43′24″N 9°17′17″W

Kilfaul (Irish: Coill Fháil) is a townland in the civil parish of Ballyovey, in the historical barony of Carra in County Mayo, Ireland. It was the site of the Kilfaul Ambush during the Irish War of Independence on 7 March 1921, when a lorry of soldiers of the Border Regiment were ambushed by two companies of the Irish Republican Army led by Tom Maguire.
