= Liam Naughten =

Irish politician (1944–1996)

Cathaoirleach of Seanad Éireann
- In office 12 July 1995 – 16 November 1996
- Preceded by: Seán Fallon
- Succeeded by: Brian Mullooly

Senator
- In office 1 November 1989 – 16 November 1996
- In office 8 October 1981 – 18 February 1982
- Constituency: Agricultural Panel

Teachta Dála
- In office February 1982 – June 1989
- Constituency: Roscommon

Personal details
- Born: 30 May 1944 Roscommon, Ireland
- Died: 16 November 1996 (aged 52) Galway, Ireland
- Party: Fine Gael
- Spouse: Mary Murray
- Children: 8, including Denis
- Education: University College Galway

Liam Anthony Naughten (30 May 1944 – 16 November 1996) was an Irish Fine Gael politician.

Naughten served as Cathaoirleach of Seanad Éireann from 1995 to 1996. He was a Senator for the Agricultural Panel from 1977 to 1982 and 1989 to 1996. He served as a Teachta Dála (TD) for the Roscommon constituency from 1982 to 1989.

== Biography ==
A farmer, he first contested the 1977 general election for the Roscommon–Leitrim constituency, but he was not elected. He was again unsuccessful at the 1981 general election, but was elected to the 15th Seanad for the Agricultural Panel.

He was finally elected to Dáil Éireann at the February 1982 general election for the Roscommon constituency and held his seat until losing it at the 1989 general election to Fine Gael running-mate John Connor. He was again elected to the Seanad and retained this seat after again failing to be elected for Longford–Roscommon at the 1992 general election.

In 1995, when Fine Gael formed a Government, Naughten became Cathaoirleach of the Seanad.

Naughten died in a traffic accident on 16 November 1996.

His son Denis Naughten was elected in a by-election to fill his Seanad seat, and was elected to the Dáil in the 1997 general election.

== See also ==
- Families in the Oireachtas

Oireachtas
Preceded by Seán Fallon	Cathaoirleach of Seanad Éireann; 1995–1996	Succeeded by Brian Mullooly

Dáil	Election	Deputy (Party)	Deputy (Party)	Deputy (Party)	Deputy (Party)
4th	1923	George Noble Plunkett (Rep)	Henry Finlay (CnaG)	Gerald Boland (Rep)	Andrew Lavin (CnaG)
4th	1925 by-election	George Noble Plunkett (Rep)	Martin Conlon (CnaG)	Gerald Boland (Rep)	Andrew Lavin (CnaG)
5th	1927 (Jun)	Patrick O'Dowd (FF)	Martin Conlon (CnaG)	Gerald Boland (FF)	Michael Brennan (Ind.)
6th	1927 (Sep)	Patrick O'Dowd (FF)	Martin Conlon (CnaG)	Gerald Boland (FF)	Michael Brennan (Ind.)
7th	1932	Daniel O'Rourke (FF)	Martin Conlon (CnaG)	Gerald Boland (FF)	Frank MacDermot (NCP)
8th	1933	Patrick O'Dowd (FF)	Michael Brennan (CnaG)	Gerald Boland (FF)	Frank MacDermot (NCP)
9th	1937	Michael Brennan (FG)	Daniel O'Rourke (FF)	Gerald Boland (FF)	3 seats 1937–1948
10th	1938	Michael Brennan (FG)	Daniel O'Rourke (FF)	Gerald Boland (FF)	3 seats 1937–1948
11th	1943	John Meighan (CnaT)	John Beirne (CnaT)	Gerald Boland (FF)	3 seats 1937–1948
12th	1944	Daniel O'Rourke (FF)	John Beirne (CnaT)	Gerald Boland (FF)	3 seats 1937–1948
13th	1948	Daniel O'Rourke (FF)	John Beirne (CnaT)	Gerald Boland (FF)	Jack McQuillan (CnaP)
14th	1951	John Finan (CnaT)	John Beirne (CnaT)	Gerald Boland (FF)	Jack McQuillan (Ind.)
15th	1954	James Burke (FG)	John Beirne (CnaT)	Gerald Boland (FF)	Jack McQuillan (Ind.)
16th	1957	James Burke (FG)	John Beirne (CnaT)	Gerald Boland (FF)	Jack McQuillan (Ind.)
17th	1961	James Burke (FG)	Patrick J. Reynolds (FG)	Brian Lenihan Snr (FF)	Jack McQuillan (NPD)
17th	1964 by-election	Joan Burke (FG)	Patrick J. Reynolds (FG)	Brian Lenihan Snr (FF)	Jack McQuillan (NPD)
18th	1965	Joan Burke (FG)	Patrick J. Reynolds (FG)	Brian Lenihan Snr (FF)	Hugh Gibbons (FF)
19th	1969	Constituency abolished. See Roscommon–Leitrim			

Dáil	Election	Deputy (Party)	Deputy (Party)	Deputy (Party)
22nd	1981	Terry Leyden (FF)	Seán Doherty (FF)	John Connor (FG)
23rd	1982 (Feb)	Terry Leyden (FF)	Seán Doherty (FF)	Liam Naughten (FG)
24th	1982 (Nov)	Terry Leyden (FF)	Seán Doherty (FF)	Liam Naughten (FG)
25th	1987	Terry Leyden (FF)	Seán Doherty (FF)	Liam Naughten (FG)
26th	1989	Terry Leyden (FF)	Tom Foxe (Ind.)	John Connor (FG)
27th	1992	Constituency abolished. See Longford–Roscommon		
