= Kilfaul ambush =

Engagement in the Irish War of Independence

- Part of the Irish War of Independence
| Date | 7 March 1921 |
| Location | Kilfaul, County Mayo 53.723°N 9.288°W |
| Result | IRA ambush succeeds |

Belligerents
| Irish Republican Army (Srah and Ballyglass companies) | United Kingdom: 2nd Battalion Border Regiment (including Black and Tans) |

Commanders and leaders
| Tom Maguire | (United Kingdom) Captain Chatfield |

Strength
| Up to 60 volunteers | 18 men |

Casualties and losses
| None | 1 mortally injured, 3 others injured. |
- Location within island of Ireland

The Kilfaul ambush was an engagement in the Irish War of Independence. It was the first attack on the British army in Mayo during the War. On Monday 7 March 1921 a Crossley Tender of the 2nd Battalion Border Regiment set out from Ballinrobe towards Castlebar. There were two officers, 15 other ranks and a Royal Army Service Corps driver. They were experienced and well-trained.

The ambush occurred at Kilfaul, a mile north of Partry. The IRA force was made up of the Srah and Ballyglass companies and was led by Tom Maguire. They had shotguns and some rifles. They were on both sides of the road. Martin Conroy was assigned to shoot the driver and another man assigned to throw grenades. Conroy hit the driver and the vehicle stopped. Captain Chatfield was shot in the knee and badly wounded. Corporal Bell was severely wounded and Privates Warle and Southworth injured. The pins were not pulled out of the grenades so they did not explode. Some soldiers returned fire from behind the vehicle. These soldiers were badly outnumbered and retreated towards Ballinrobe. The others around the cab surrendered . The British wounded were attended to by Commandant Michael O’Brien. After the IRA withdrew the wounded were taken to the County Infirmary in Castlebar . The RIC and British army searched the district. A farmer, Thomas Horan was shot by the RIC that night, likely in revenge. Corporal Bell died from his injuries on 12 March.
