= Pearse Stadium =

Sports venue in Galway, Ireland

- Páirc an Phiarsaigh
- Galway versus Kilkenny at Pearse Stadium in 2014

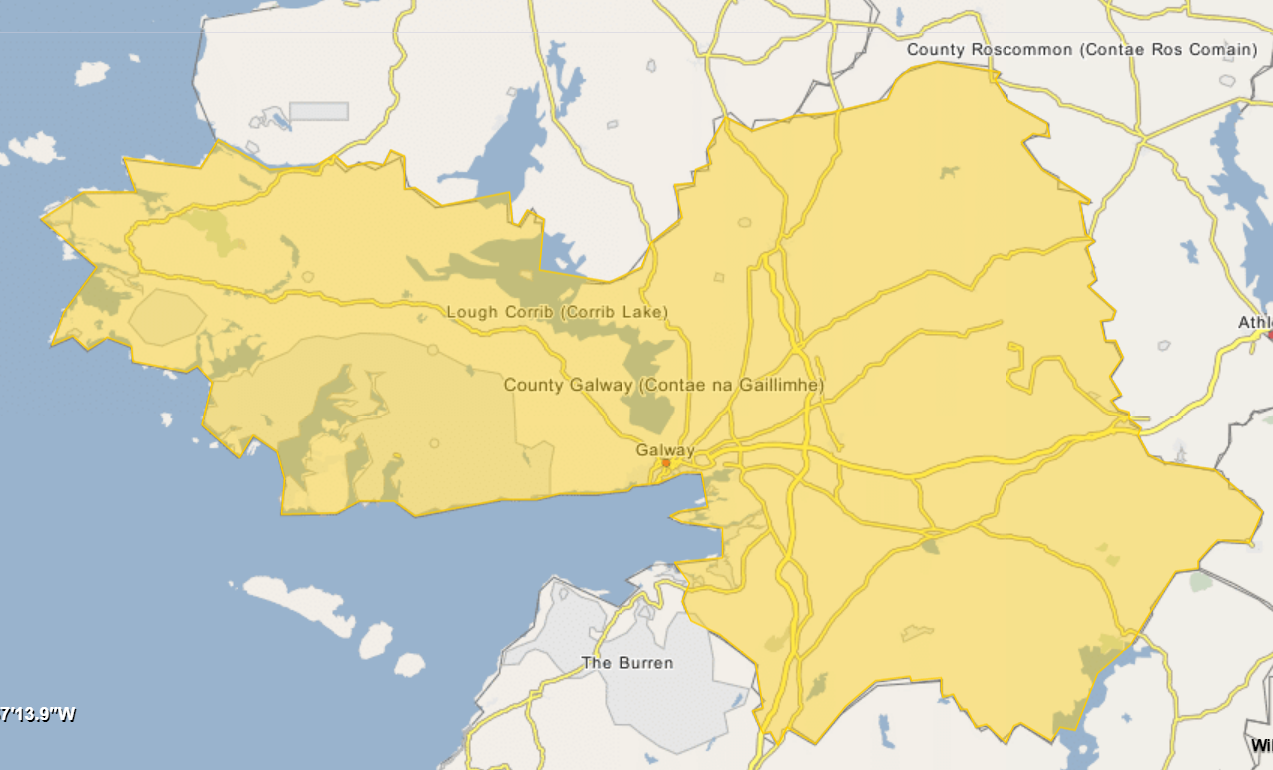
- Location within County Galway
- Location: Dr Mannix Road, Salthill, Galway City, Galway, H91 PX30, Ireland
- Coordinates: 53°15′48″N 9°5′3″W
- Owner: Gaelic Athletic Association
- Capacity: 26,197 Capacity history: 34,000 (2002–2011) 26,197 (2011–present)
- Field size: 145 x 90 m
- Public transit: Galway railway station

Construction
- Opened: 1957
- Renovated: 2002
- Cost: £34000

Website
- galwaygaa.ie/pearse-stadium-salthill

Pearse Stadium (Irish: Páirc an Phiarsaigh) is the principal GAA stadium in Galway, Ireland. The Galway GAA Gaelic football and hurling teams use the stadium for their home games. The stadium, amongst others in the province of Connacht, is also used for games in the Connacht Senior Football Championship

== History ==
=== Early years ===
The stadium opened on 16 June 1957, as 16,000 people came to watch Galway beat Tipperary in hurling, and Kerry in football, and to watch Bishop Michael Browne bless the facility. The stadium was opened by GAA President, Séamus McFerran. Among those invited were the 12 surviving members of the 1923 all-Ireland winning hurling team.

The site on which the stadium was built was known locally as The Boggers. The 17-acre (69,000 m^{2}) site was offered to the Gaelic Athletic Association by the town secretary Sean Gillan, and terms of purchase were negotiated. Much of the land was very wet and boggy. Work was being carried out to deepen the River Corrib at the time, so the infill from the river was used to fill in parts of the pitch and give it an elevated sideline.

Pearse Stadium hosted many hurling and football matches since, but it fell into disuse in the early 1990s.

=== Re-opening ===
The stadium was renovated in 2002 and reopened in May 2003 with a capacity then set at 34,000. Since the major redevelopment of the ground, it has regularly hosted the Connacht Senior Football Championship final in recent years.

In 2006 the International Series versus Australia was played in Pearse Stadium which was the first time it took place outside GAA Headquarters Croke Park. On 21 June 2008, Irish vocal pop band Westlife held a concert for Back Home Tour supporting their album Back Home. English singer Ed Sheeran also held two concert in Pearse Stadium on 12 and 13 May 2018 and an additional stand was made so the stadium could host a total 63,000 fans over the two nights.

== Parking and safety ==
The stadium occasionally receives negative publicity due to the lack of dedicated off-street parking. In response to repeated representations made by local residents as well as community groups campaigning on pedestrian rights and road safety issues, the Garda Siochana handed out large numbers of parking tickets on at least two occasions in October 2010. Some GAA fans saw this as harsh. However, both the GAA County Board and the Garda Siochana were adamant that they had issued repeated warnings in advance and insisted that illegally parked vehicles were ticketed after these warnings were ignored.

A nationwide health and safety survey of GAA grounds in 2011 resulted in the certified capacity of the stadium being reduced to 26,197.

== See also ==
- List of Gaelic Athletic Association stadiums
- List of stadiums in Ireland by capacity
