= Vincent O'Donoghue =

Gaelic sports administrator

President of the Gaelic Athletic Association
- In office 1952–1955
- Preceded by: Michael Kehoe
- Succeeded by: Séamus McFerran

Personal details
- Born: 18 May 1900
- Died: 29 May 1972 (aged 72)

Michael Vincent O'Donoghue (18 May 1900 – 29 May 1972) was the 17th president of the Gaelic Athletic Association (1952–1955).

Born in Portumna, Galway, the younger of twins, O'Donoghue was the son of an RIC man, and grew up in a variety of places in Ireland. Although a member of the RIC, his father participated in GAA games, usually under assumed names, and O'Donoghue recalls playing hurling from an early age: at age four, while hurling, his twin brother was almost killed in a weight throwing accident.

As an engineering student in UCC, O'Donoghue joined the Cork 1 Brigade of the IRA as its engineer, and took prominent part in the War of Independence, while his twin brother James joined the RIC. O'Donoghue worked closely with Michael O'Neill, whose killing led to the Dunmanway killings; O'Donoghue's witness statement was later used to deny any sectarian motivation in the killings.

He was involved in the administration of the GAA, becoming chairman of the Waterford county committee from 1936 to 1946 and again in 1948. He strongly opposed the decision to hold the 1947 All-Ireland Football final in New York, arguing that it would encourage emigration.

He died in May 1972 and is buried in St Carthage's Cemetery, Lismore, Co Waterford.

This article incorporates text available under the CC BY 3.0 license.

Sporting positions
Preceded by Michael Kehoe	President of the Gaelic Athletic Association; 1952–1955	Succeeded by Séamus McFerran
