= Patrick O'Dowd =

Irish politician and medical practitioner (1892–1968)

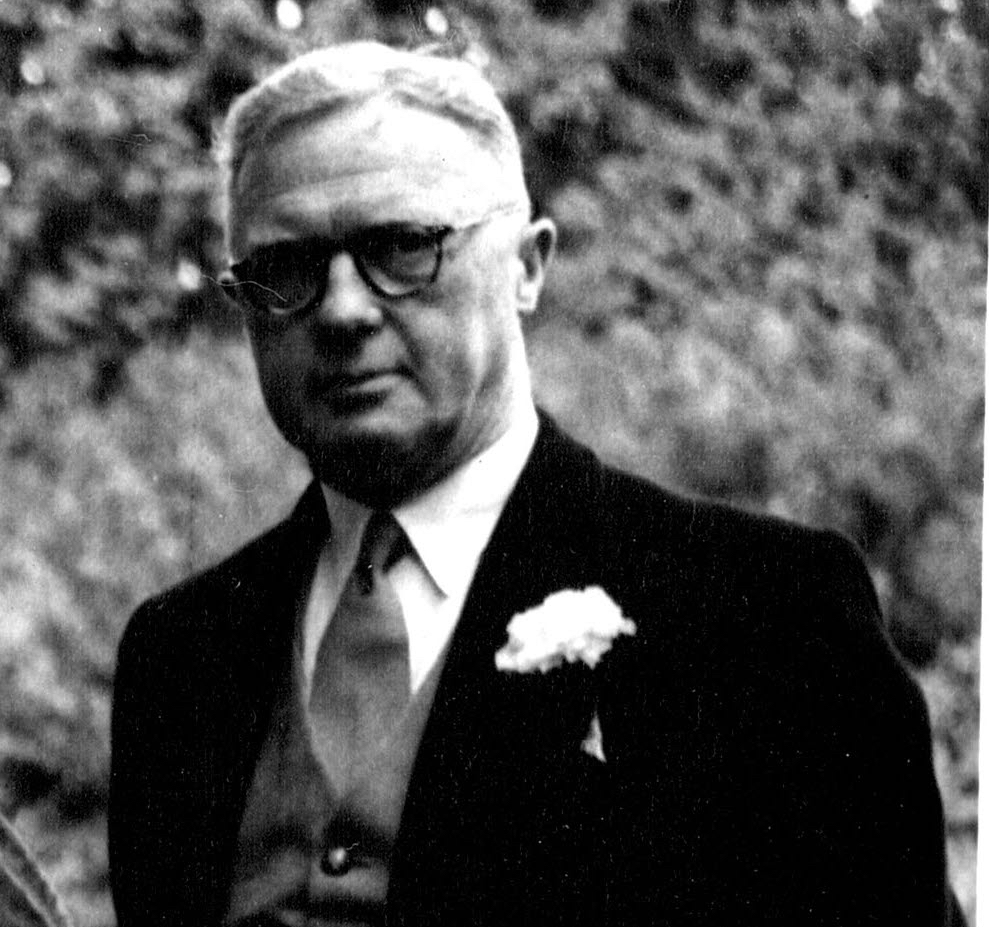
- O'Dowd, c.1950s

Teachta Dála
- In office January 1933 – June 1937
- In office June 1927 – January 1932
- Constituency: Roscommon

Personal details
- Born: 1 March 1892 Graffoge, Bumlin, County Roscommon, Ireland
- Died: 19 June 1968 (aged 76) Charleville Road, Cabra, Dublin, Ireland
- Cause of death: Heart attack
- Resting place: Deans Grange Cemetery, Dublin, Ireland
- Party: Fianna Fáil; Independent
- Spouses: Eva Igoe (died 1947); Kathleen Donohue (m. 1950)
- Children: 6
- Education: University College Dublin

Patrick Joseph O'Dowd (1 March 1892 – 19 June 1968) was an Irish politician and medical practitioner. He was first elected to Dáil Éireann as a Fianna Fáil Teachta Dála (TD) for the Roscommon constituency at the June 1927 general election. He was re-elected at the September 1927 general election but lost his seat at the 1932 general election. He was elected again at the 1933 general election but again lost his seat at the 1937 general election.

== Early life and career ==
O'Dowd was born in 1892 at Graffoge, Roscommon as the second son of James O'Dowd and Honoria (Nora) Shanagher. His parents were both teachers at the local national school where he began his education. He then attended Summerhill College in Sligo. He is said to have been the first registrant of the National University of Ireland, having arrived from the country a day before it was due to open, in order to study medicine at University College Dublin. Upon graduation as a physician, he worked for the Irish Dispensary System, a public health system that had been established in Ireland in the 1850s under the Irish Poor Laws. His first clinic was the dispensary in Elphin, County Roscommon. After the Second World War, he moved to become the doctor at a dispensary in Dublin.

O'Dowd is listed in the 1911 census of Ireland as being a speaker of Irish and English languages. His first wife, Evangela (Eva) Igoe, had strong Irish republican sympathies and was a member of Cumann na mBan. O'Dowd was a medical officer with the Irish Republican Army during the Irish War of Independence. Patrick and Eva O'Dowd would take their annual family holiday in a Gaeltacht in County Kerry in order to maintain the family's ability to speak Irish.

== Political life ==
In the 1920s and 1930s, O'Dowd stood for election and sat in the 5th Dáil, 6th Dáil and 8th Dáil. In 1937, he resigned from the Fianna Fáil political party over a disagreement with its leader Éamon de Valera. He stood as an Independent at the 1937 general election but lost his seat. O'Dowd spoke frequently in the Dáil, mainly on issues of public health, Roscommon land allocation, and affairs of his constituents.

In 1927, he supported William Redmond who proposed to the Government that a commission be established to investigate and report on the circumstances of the British ex-Servicemen in the Irish Free State because of concerns regarding "alleged discrimination against them in regard to employment on public works or in regard to their general rights".

O'Dowd played contract bridge representing Ireland on several occasions at the "Home Internationals" in the 1940s and 1950s. Eva O'Dowd died of breast cancer in 1947. O'Dowd married Kathleen Donohue of Cavan in 1950. He died of a heart attack in 1968.

Dáil	Election	Deputy (Party)	Deputy (Party)	Deputy (Party)	Deputy (Party)
4th	1923	George Noble Plunkett (Rep)	Henry Finlay (CnaG)	Gerald Boland (Rep)	Andrew Lavin (CnaG)
4th	1925 by-election	George Noble Plunkett (Rep)	Martin Conlon (CnaG)	Gerald Boland (Rep)	Andrew Lavin (CnaG)
5th	1927 (Jun)	Patrick O'Dowd (FF)	Martin Conlon (CnaG)	Gerald Boland (FF)	Michael Brennan (Ind.)
6th	1927 (Sep)	Patrick O'Dowd (FF)	Martin Conlon (CnaG)	Gerald Boland (FF)	Michael Brennan (Ind.)
7th	1932	Daniel O'Rourke (FF)	Martin Conlon (CnaG)	Gerald Boland (FF)	Frank MacDermot (NCP)
8th	1933	Patrick O'Dowd (FF)	Michael Brennan (CnaG)	Gerald Boland (FF)	Frank MacDermot (NCP)
9th	1937	Michael Brennan (FG)	Daniel O'Rourke (FF)	Gerald Boland (FF)	3 seats 1937–1948
10th	1938	Michael Brennan (FG)	Daniel O'Rourke (FF)	Gerald Boland (FF)	3 seats 1937–1948
11th	1943	John Meighan (CnaT)	John Beirne (CnaT)	Gerald Boland (FF)	3 seats 1937–1948
12th	1944	Daniel O'Rourke (FF)	John Beirne (CnaT)	Gerald Boland (FF)	3 seats 1937–1948
13th	1948	Daniel O'Rourke (FF)	John Beirne (CnaT)	Gerald Boland (FF)	Jack McQuillan (CnaP)
14th	1951	John Finan (CnaT)	John Beirne (CnaT)	Gerald Boland (FF)	Jack McQuillan (Ind.)
15th	1954	James Burke (FG)	John Beirne (CnaT)	Gerald Boland (FF)	Jack McQuillan (Ind.)
16th	1957	James Burke (FG)	John Beirne (CnaT)	Gerald Boland (FF)	Jack McQuillan (Ind.)
17th	1961	James Burke (FG)	Patrick J. Reynolds (FG)	Brian Lenihan Snr (FF)	Jack McQuillan (NPD)
17th	1964 by-election	Joan Burke (FG)	Patrick J. Reynolds (FG)	Brian Lenihan Snr (FF)	Jack McQuillan (NPD)
18th	1965	Joan Burke (FG)	Patrick J. Reynolds (FG)	Brian Lenihan Snr (FF)	Hugh Gibbons (FF)
19th	1969	Constituency abolished. See Roscommon–Leitrim			

Dáil	Election	Deputy (Party)	Deputy (Party)	Deputy (Party)
22nd	1981	Terry Leyden (FF)	Seán Doherty (FF)	John Connor (FG)
23rd	1982 (Feb)	Terry Leyden (FF)	Seán Doherty (FF)	Liam Naughten (FG)
24th	1982 (Nov)	Terry Leyden (FF)	Seán Doherty (FF)	Liam Naughten (FG)
25th	1987	Terry Leyden (FF)	Seán Doherty (FF)	Liam Naughten (FG)
26th	1989	Terry Leyden (FF)	Tom Foxe (Ind.)	John Connor (FG)
27th	1992	Constituency abolished. See Longford–Roscommon		
