= Daniel O'Rourke (politician) =

Irish politician and sportsman (died 1968)

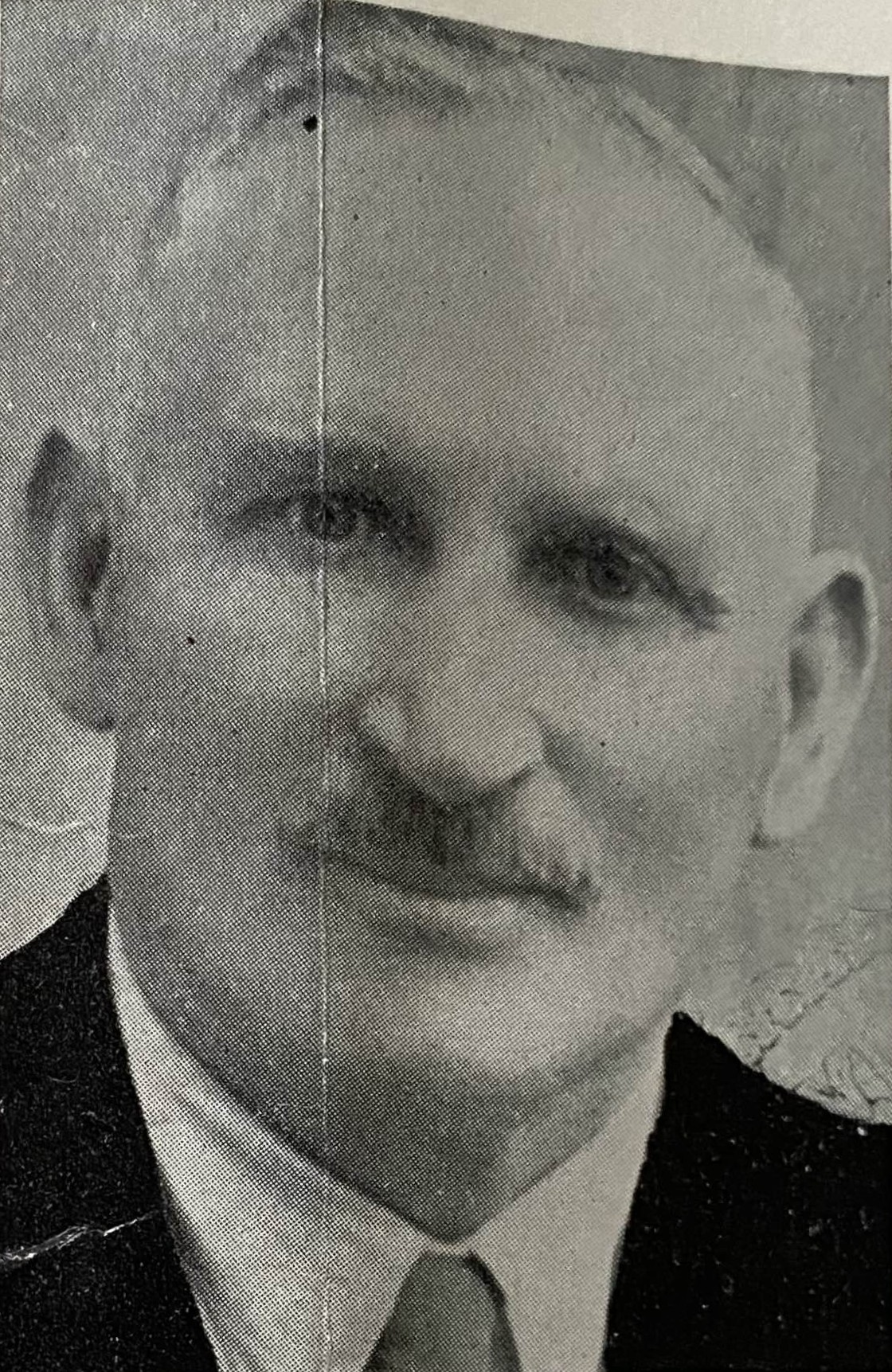
- O'Rourke in 1947

Senator
- In office 14 August 1951 – 22 July 1954
- Constituency: Labour Panel

Teachta Dála
- In office May 1944 – May 1951
- In office July 1937 – June 1943
- In office February 1932 – January 1933
- Constituency: Roscommon
- In office May 1921 – 29 November 1922
- Constituency: Mayo South–Roscommon South

Personal details
- Born: Manorhamilton, County Leitrim, Ireland
- Died: 4 August 1968 County Roscommon, Ireland
- Party: Sinn Féin; Fianna Fáil
- Education: De La Salle Teacher Training College

Daniel O'Rourke (died 4 August 1968) was an Irish politician and sportsman.

He was born in the townland of Tents, near Manorhamilton, County Leitrim, but soon moved to County Roscommon, basing himself in Castlerea, where he worked as a teacher. He was a Gaelic footballer and later president of the Gaelic Athletic Association (GAA). He was a member of Roscommon County Council for 40 years, and a Teachta Dála (TD) for periods between 1921 and 1951.

He was elected unopposed as a Sinn Féin TD to the Second Dáil at the 1921 elections for the Mayo South–Roscommon South constituency. He said later that his election came as a surprise to him, as he did not know he had been nominated and did not want to be. Although he opposed the Anglo-Irish Treaty, he voted in favour of it, as he believed the alternative of further war was worse. He was re-elected unopposed as a pro-Treaty Sinn Féin TD at the 1922 general election. He resigned his seat on 29 November 1922. He stood as a Fianna Fáil candidate at the September 1927 general election but was not elected.

He was elected as a Fianna Fáil TD at the 1932 general election for the Roscommon constituency but lost his seat at the 1933 general election. He was re-elected at the 1937 and 1938 general elections but again lost his seat at the 1943 general election. He was re-elected at the 1944 and 1948 general elections but once again lost his seat at the 1951 general election. At the 1951 Seanad election, he was elected on the Labour Panel. He stood unsuccessfully at the 1954 and 1957 general elections.

He played football for the Roscommon county team, founded the Tarmon GAA club, and was president of the GAA from 1946 to 1949.

Sporting positions
Preceded by Séamus Gardiner	President of the Gaelic Athletic Association; 1946–1949	Succeeded by Michael Kehoe

Dáil	Election	Deputy (Party)	Deputy (Party)	Deputy (Party)	Deputy (Party)
2nd	1921	Harry Boland (SF)	Tom Maguire (SF)	Daniel O'Rourke (SF)	William Sears (SF)
3rd	1922	Harry Boland (AT-SF)	Tom Maguire (AT-SF)	Daniel O'Rourke (PT-SF)	William Sears (PT-SF)
4th	1923	Constituency abolished. See Roscommon and Mayo South			

Dáil	Election	Deputy (Party)	Deputy (Party)	Deputy (Party)	Deputy (Party)
4th	1923	George Noble Plunkett (Rep)	Henry Finlay (CnaG)	Gerald Boland (Rep)	Andrew Lavin (CnaG)
4th	1925 by-election	George Noble Plunkett (Rep)	Martin Conlon (CnaG)	Gerald Boland (Rep)	Andrew Lavin (CnaG)
5th	1927 (Jun)	Patrick O'Dowd (FF)	Martin Conlon (CnaG)	Gerald Boland (FF)	Michael Brennan (Ind.)
6th	1927 (Sep)	Patrick O'Dowd (FF)	Martin Conlon (CnaG)	Gerald Boland (FF)	Michael Brennan (Ind.)
7th	1932	Daniel O'Rourke (FF)	Martin Conlon (CnaG)	Gerald Boland (FF)	Frank MacDermot (NCP)
8th	1933	Patrick O'Dowd (FF)	Michael Brennan (CnaG)	Gerald Boland (FF)	Frank MacDermot (NCP)
9th	1937	Michael Brennan (FG)	Daniel O'Rourke (FF)	Gerald Boland (FF)	3 seats 1937–1948
10th	1938	Michael Brennan (FG)	Daniel O'Rourke (FF)	Gerald Boland (FF)	3 seats 1937–1948
11th	1943	John Meighan (CnaT)	John Beirne (CnaT)	Gerald Boland (FF)	3 seats 1937–1948
12th	1944	Daniel O'Rourke (FF)	John Beirne (CnaT)	Gerald Boland (FF)	3 seats 1937–1948
13th	1948	Daniel O'Rourke (FF)	John Beirne (CnaT)	Gerald Boland (FF)	Jack McQuillan (CnaP)
14th	1951	John Finan (CnaT)	John Beirne (CnaT)	Gerald Boland (FF)	Jack McQuillan (Ind.)
15th	1954	James Burke (FG)	John Beirne (CnaT)	Gerald Boland (FF)	Jack McQuillan (Ind.)
16th	1957	James Burke (FG)	John Beirne (CnaT)	Gerald Boland (FF)	Jack McQuillan (Ind.)
17th	1961	James Burke (FG)	Patrick J. Reynolds (FG)	Brian Lenihan Snr (FF)	Jack McQuillan (NPD)
17th	1964 by-election	Joan Burke (FG)	Patrick J. Reynolds (FG)	Brian Lenihan Snr (FF)	Jack McQuillan (NPD)
18th	1965	Joan Burke (FG)	Patrick J. Reynolds (FG)	Brian Lenihan Snr (FF)	Hugh Gibbons (FF)
19th	1969	Constituency abolished. See Roscommon–Leitrim			

Dáil	Election	Deputy (Party)	Deputy (Party)	Deputy (Party)
22nd	1981	Terry Leyden (FF)	Seán Doherty (FF)	John Connor (FG)
23rd	1982 (Feb)	Terry Leyden (FF)	Seán Doherty (FF)	Liam Naughten (FG)
24th	1982 (Nov)	Terry Leyden (FF)	Seán Doherty (FF)	Liam Naughten (FG)
25th	1987	Terry Leyden (FF)	Seán Doherty (FF)	Liam Naughten (FG)
26th	1989	Terry Leyden (FF)	Tom Foxe (Ind.)	John Connor (FG)
27th	1992	Constituency abolished. See Longford–Roscommon		
