= Farrell McElgunn =

Irish politician (1932–2020)

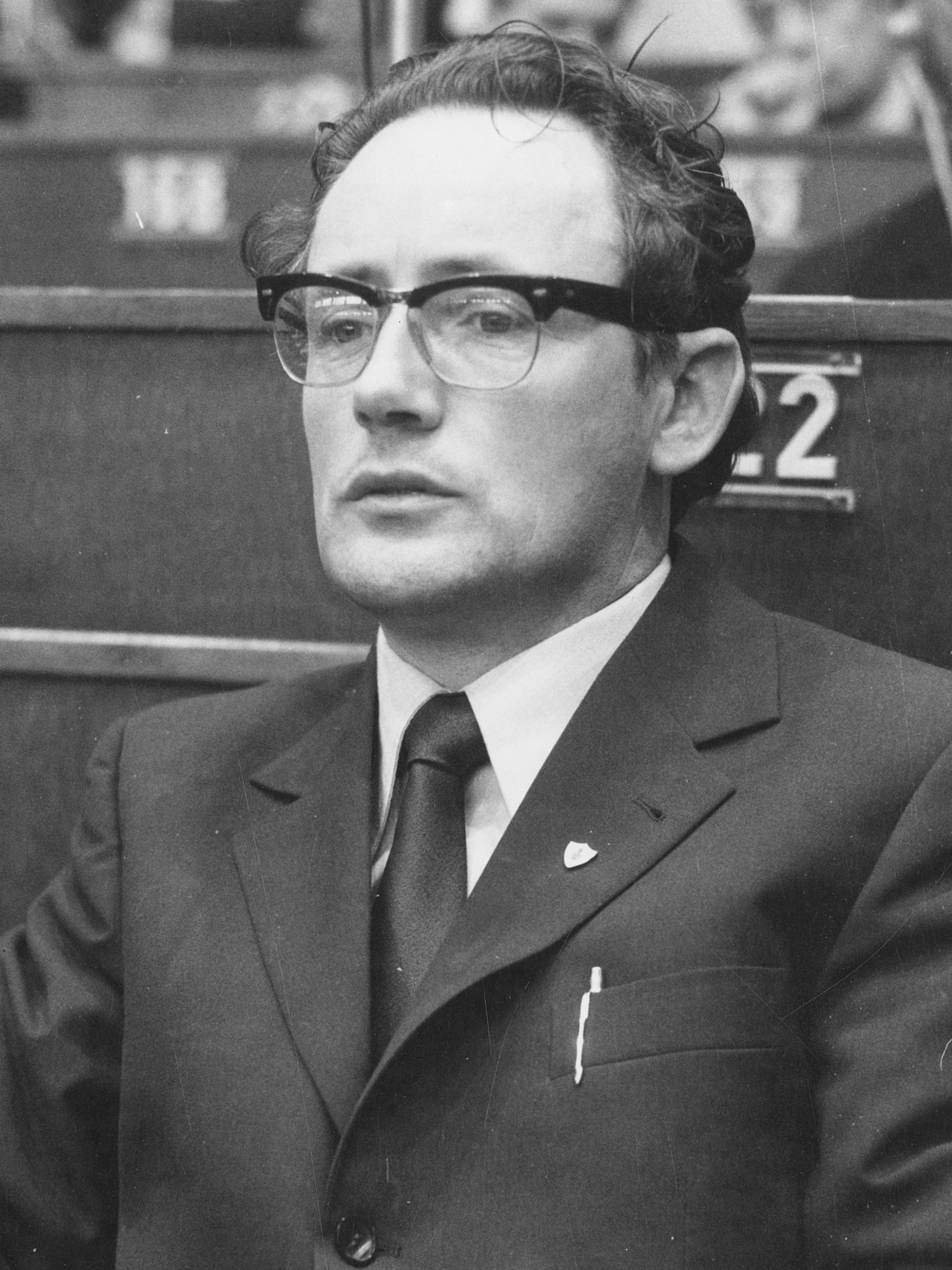
- McElgunn in 1973

Member of the European Parliament
- In office January – March 1973
- Constituency: Oireachtas Delegation

Senator
- In office November 1968 – June 1973
- Constituency: Nominated by the Taoiseach

Personal details
- Born: 5 January 1932 County Cavan, Ireland
- Died: 2 March 2020 (aged 88) County Leitrim, Ireland
- Party: Fianna Fáil
- Spouse: Mary Duignan
- Children: 6
- Education: University College Galway; St Patrick's College, Maynooth

Farrell McElgunn (5 January 1932 – 2 March 2020) was an Irish Fianna Fáil politician and teacher.

He completed a Bachelor of Arts in University College Galway in Irish and History, and later completed a masters of Irish in St Patrick's College, Maynooth. He was also a local historian. He taught in the Rosary High School, Presentation Brothers and Marymount College in Carrick-on-Shannon where he was vice-principal.

He was nominated by the Taoiseach to the 11th Seanad on 21 November 1968. He stood as a Fianna Fáil candidate at the 1969 general election for the Roscommon–Leitrim constituency but was unsuccessful. He was re-nominated by the Taoiseach to the 12th Seanad following the 1969 election. He served as a member of the first Irish delegation as a Member of the European Parliament from January to March 1973. He stood again at the 1973 general election for Roscommon–Leitrim but was again unsuccessful.

McElgunn died on 2 March 2020, aged 88.
