= Croghan, County Roscommon =

Village in County Roscommon, Ireland

Coordinates: 53°54′40″N 8°13′13″W

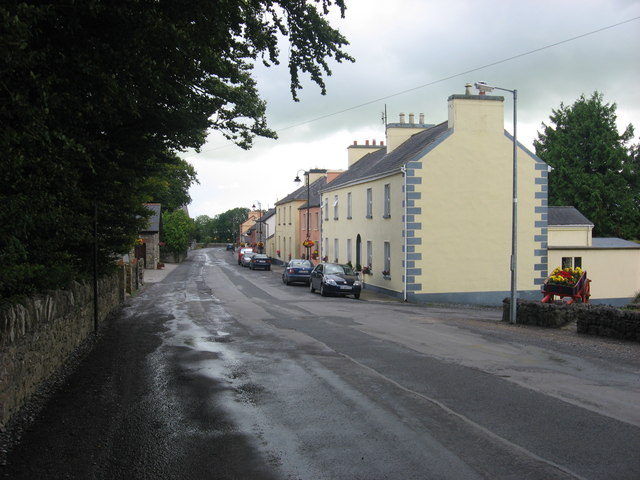
Apart from Croghan's church and community centre, the village is 'all on one side'

Croghan (Irish: Cruachán, meaning 'a round natural hill' ), is a townland and village in County Roscommon, Ireland. It is situated centrally between the towns of Boyle, Elphin and Carrick on Shannon.

== History ==
The village dates from the late 1700s and was set up by then local landlord Lloyd. The Lloyd family were granted the lands of Croghan which originally were owned by the Mcdermott's in 1680. Lloyd built a house in the 1700s where the GAA Club Rooms now stand, and in 1830 built a larger mansion nearby. Croghan village consisted of 30 houses all facing east towards the big house in a north–south direction. The only building on the other side of street was Donnellan's shop (1765), which in 1796 became the Roman Catholic Church. Croghan is now the parish name for this area incorporating the old parishes of Killukin, Killumod, Tumna, Kilcola and Estersnow. These were former monastic sites dating back up to 1500 years. Croghan was an agriculture area, and under encouragement of Guy Lloyd, fairs were set up after Trinity Sunday and 28 October, which were famous throughout west of Ireland for Croghan Shorthorn and continued till 1970. In 1898, the Croghan Co Operative Creamery was set up, being the second in Connacht and it flourished for 90 years. Today, Croghan has a six-teacher national school, three housing estates, and a tidy towns committee. In 1861, the Church of Ireland was opened and the creamery is now a centre for the community. The Shannon Gaels GAA Club have a sports ground in the community. The club has won titles at every grade in men's and ladies in the county, and were senior county champions in 1964.

== Notable people ==
- John Beirne, TD 1943–1961
- Bishop Fulton Sheen 1896–1979, grandson of Bridget Fulton Croghan.
- William Trevor, (Cox) 1928–2016 author, is the son of a Croghan man.
