= Hugh Gibbons =

Irish politician and medical doctor (1916–2007)

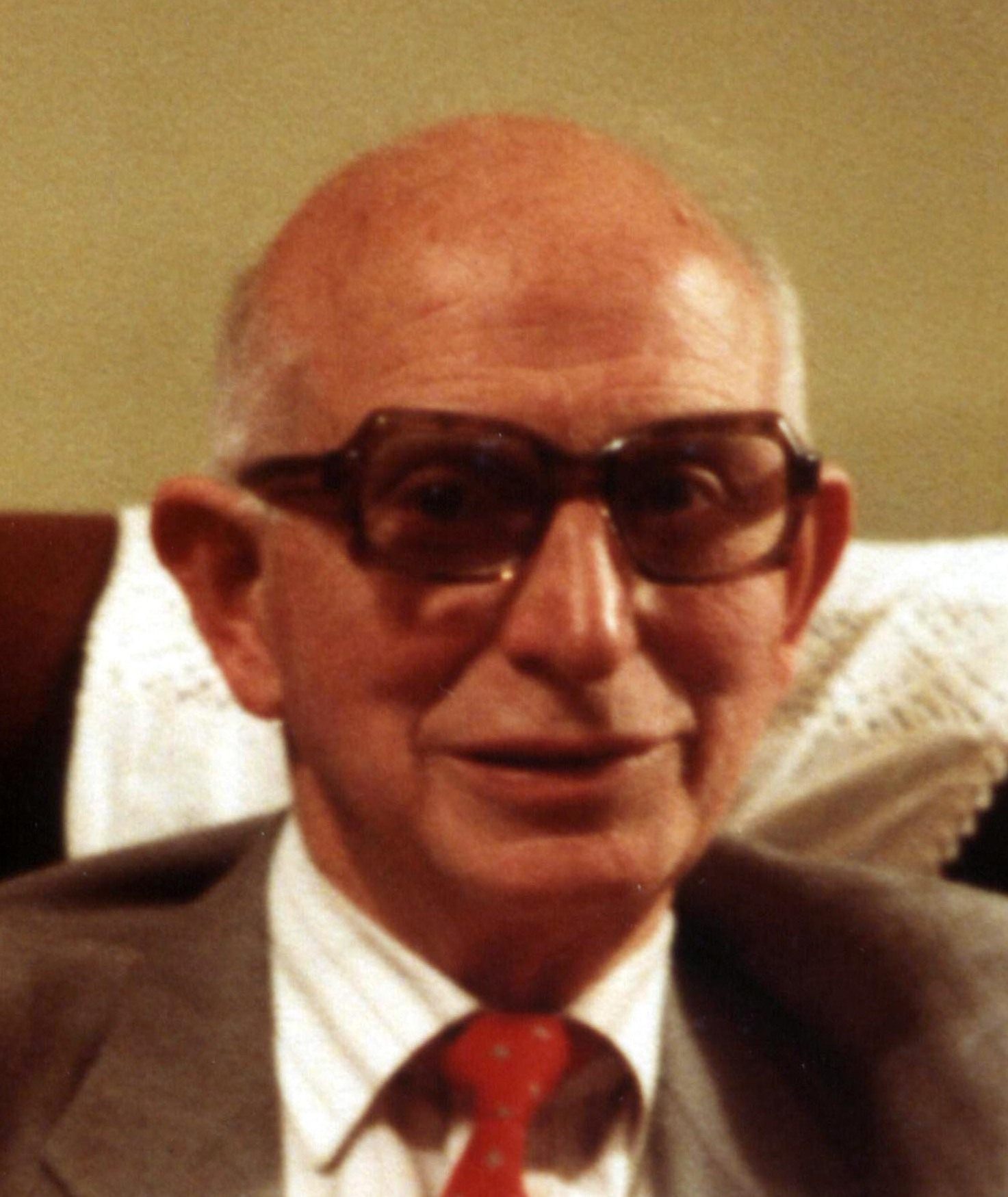
- Gibbons in 2002

Teachta Dála
- In office June 1969 – June 1977
- Constituency: Roscommon–Leitrim
- In office April 1965 – June 1969
- Constituency: Roscommon

Personal details
- Born: 6 July 1916 Strokestown, County Roscommon, Ireland
- Died: 14 November 2007 (aged 91) County Roscommon, Ireland
- Party: Fianna Fáil
- Spouse: Josephine Lee (m. 1949)
- Children: 6, including Brian
- Education: University College Galway

Hugh Gibbons
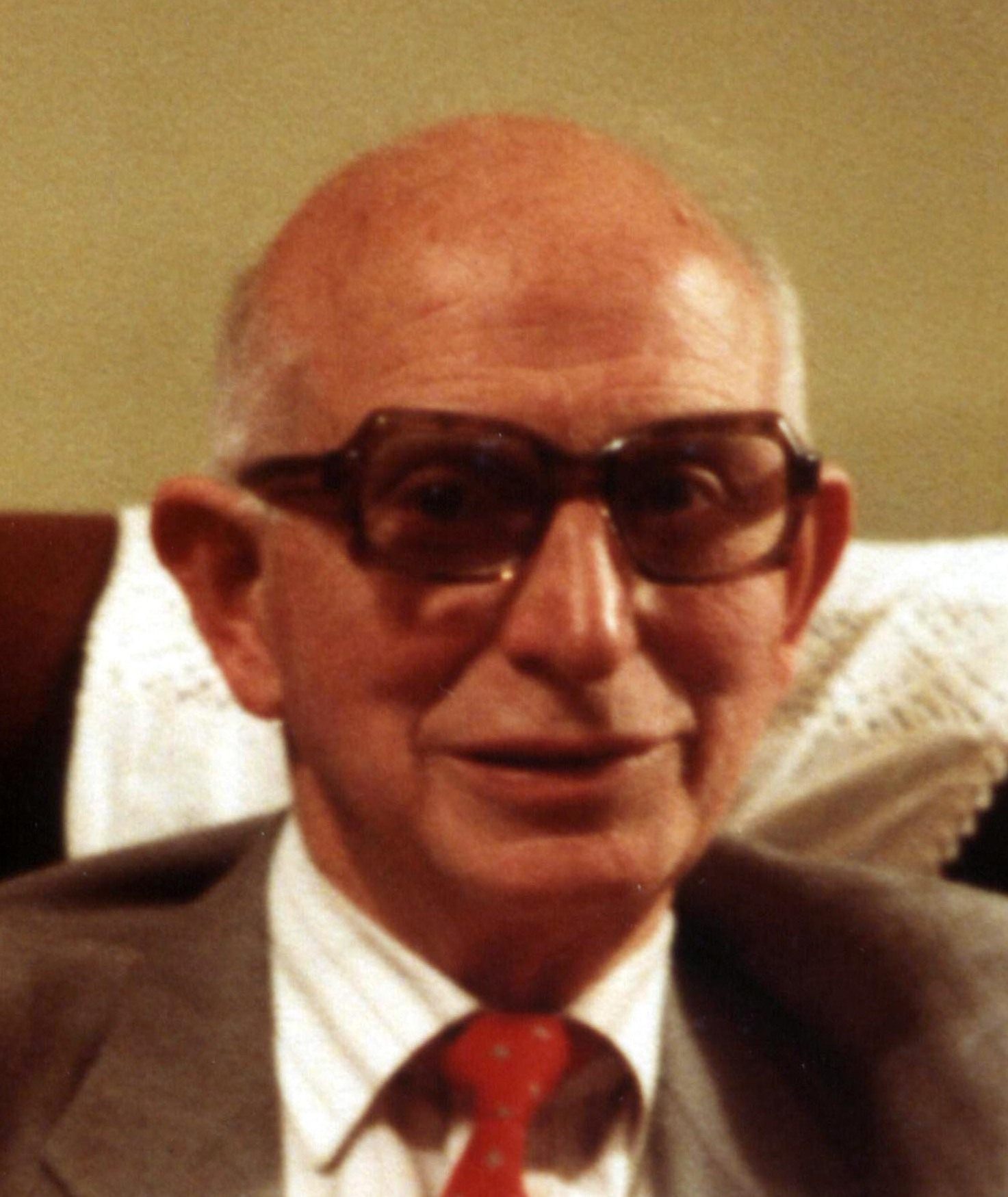

Sport
- Sport: Gaelic football
- Position: Full-forward
Club
- Years: Club
- 1930s–1950s: St Ronan's
Inter-county
- Years: County
- 1930s–1940s: Roscommon
Inter-county titles
- Connacht titles: 4
- All-Irelands: 2
- NFL: 0

Hugh Gibbons (6 July 1916 – 14 November 2007) was an Irish Fianna Fáil politician who sat in Dáil Éireann as a Teachta Dála (TD) for twelve years, from 1965 to 1977.

== Early life ==
He was born 6 July 1916 in Ballybeg, Strokestown, County Roscommon, the fourth child of Luke Gibbons and his wife Ellen (née Egan). His parents married in 1910 and his father was a publican and merchant. Hugh Gibbons was educated in Carniska national school, Strokestown, and in 1929 won a scholarship to attend secondary school at Summerhill College, Sligo. In 1934 he won a scholarship to University College Galway and passed his final medical exams in December 1940.

== Politics ==
A medical doctor before entering politics, Gibbons was not elected on his first attempt, when he stood as the Fianna Fáil candidate at the 1964 Roscommon by-election. He was elected for the Roscommon constituency at the 1965 general election. After constituency changes, he was re-elected at the 1969 general election in the new Roscommon–Leitrim constituency. He was returned to the Dáil again at the 1973 general election, but did not contest the 1977 general election and retired from politics.

== Sports ==
Gibbons was also holder of three All-Ireland Medals while playing for Roscommon in the All-Ireland Senior Club Football and Junior Club Football Championships. In 1940 he played with the county junior team, which won the All-Ireland junior title that year. He then played for the county team which won the All-Ireland senior titles in 1943 and 1944. He also played for and co founded St Ronan's GAA club in North Roscommon.

== Death and personal life ==
He married Josephine Lee in 1949, and they had four sons and two daughters. His son, Brian Gibbons was the Labour Party Welsh Assembly Member for Aberavon from 1999 to 2010.

He died on 14 November 2007 at his home in Keadue, aged 91. On his death, he was described by then Taoiseach Bertie Ahern as a "sportsman and a scholar".

Dáil	Election	Deputy (Party)	Deputy (Party)	Deputy (Party)	Deputy (Party)
4th	1923	George Noble Plunkett (Rep)	Henry Finlay (CnaG)	Gerald Boland (Rep)	Andrew Lavin (CnaG)
4th	1925 by-election	George Noble Plunkett (Rep)	Martin Conlon (CnaG)	Gerald Boland (Rep)	Andrew Lavin (CnaG)
5th	1927 (Jun)	Patrick O'Dowd (FF)	Martin Conlon (CnaG)	Gerald Boland (FF)	Michael Brennan (Ind.)
6th	1927 (Sep)	Patrick O'Dowd (FF)	Martin Conlon (CnaG)	Gerald Boland (FF)	Michael Brennan (Ind.)
7th	1932	Daniel O'Rourke (FF)	Martin Conlon (CnaG)	Gerald Boland (FF)	Frank MacDermot (NCP)
8th	1933	Patrick O'Dowd (FF)	Michael Brennan (CnaG)	Gerald Boland (FF)	Frank MacDermot (NCP)
9th	1937	Michael Brennan (FG)	Daniel O'Rourke (FF)	Gerald Boland (FF)	3 seats 1937–1948
10th	1938	Michael Brennan (FG)	Daniel O'Rourke (FF)	Gerald Boland (FF)	3 seats 1937–1948
11th	1943	John Meighan (CnaT)	John Beirne (CnaT)	Gerald Boland (FF)	3 seats 1937–1948
12th	1944	Daniel O'Rourke (FF)	John Beirne (CnaT)	Gerald Boland (FF)	3 seats 1937–1948
13th	1948	Daniel O'Rourke (FF)	John Beirne (CnaT)	Gerald Boland (FF)	Jack McQuillan (CnaP)
14th	1951	John Finan (CnaT)	John Beirne (CnaT)	Gerald Boland (FF)	Jack McQuillan (Ind.)
15th	1954	James Burke (FG)	John Beirne (CnaT)	Gerald Boland (FF)	Jack McQuillan (Ind.)
16th	1957	James Burke (FG)	John Beirne (CnaT)	Gerald Boland (FF)	Jack McQuillan (Ind.)
17th	1961	James Burke (FG)	Patrick J. Reynolds (FG)	Brian Lenihan Snr (FF)	Jack McQuillan (NPD)
17th	1964 by-election	Joan Burke (FG)	Patrick J. Reynolds (FG)	Brian Lenihan Snr (FF)	Jack McQuillan (NPD)
18th	1965	Joan Burke (FG)	Patrick J. Reynolds (FG)	Brian Lenihan Snr (FF)	Hugh Gibbons (FF)
19th	1969	Constituency abolished. See Roscommon–Leitrim			

Dáil	Election	Deputy (Party)	Deputy (Party)	Deputy (Party)
22nd	1981	Terry Leyden (FF)	Seán Doherty (FF)	John Connor (FG)
23rd	1982 (Feb)	Terry Leyden (FF)	Seán Doherty (FF)	Liam Naughten (FG)
24th	1982 (Nov)	Terry Leyden (FF)	Seán Doherty (FF)	Liam Naughten (FG)
25th	1987	Terry Leyden (FF)	Seán Doherty (FF)	Liam Naughten (FG)
26th	1989	Terry Leyden (FF)	Tom Foxe (Ind.)	John Connor (FG)
27th	1992	Constituency abolished. See Longford–Roscommon		

Dáil	Election	Deputy (Party)	Deputy (Party)	Deputy (Party)
19th	1969	Hugh Gibbons (FF)	Brian Lenihan (FF)	Joan Burke (FG)
20th	1973	Hugh Gibbons (FF)	Patrick J. Reynolds (FG)	Joan Burke (FG)
21st	1977	Terry Leyden (FF)	Seán Doherty (FF)	Joan Burke (FG)
22nd	1981	Constituency abolished. See Roscommon and Sligo–Leitrim		
