= Michael Kehoe =

Irish sports president (1899–1977)

Michael Kehoe (22 June 1899 – 8 January 1977) was the 16th president of the Gaelic Athletic Association (1949–1952).

Born in Wexford, Kehoe took part in the Easter Rising there. Active in the Irish language movement, Kehoe was co-founder of Coláiste Charman, which taught Irish from the 1930s to the 1970s.

Kehoe was involved in Leinster Council for over 50 years, and was chairman from 1942 to 1944.

The Kehoe Cup, an inter-county hurling competition in Leinster, was named in his honour in 1977.

In 1984, to mark the centenary of the GAA, 50,000 ash trees were planted to commemorate the memories of Kehoe and Patrick Breen.

Sporting positions
Preceded by Daniel O'Rourke	President of the Gaelic Athletic Association; 1949–1952	Succeeded by Vincent O'Donoghue
