= Terry Leyden =

Irish former politician (born 1945)

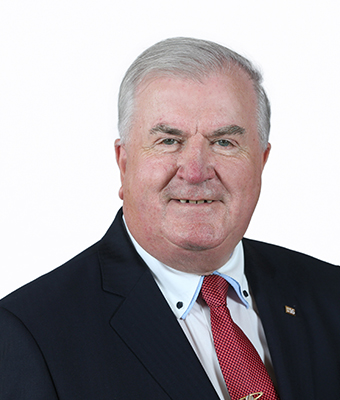

Senator
- In office 12 September 2002 – 29 June 2020
- Constituency: Labour Panel
- In office 3 December 1992 – 17 February 1993
- Constituency: Nominated by the Taoiseach

Minister of State
- 1989–1992: Industry and Commerce
- 1987–1989: Health
- Mar.–Dec. 1982: Transport
- Mar.–Dec. 1982: Posts and Telegraphs

Teachta Dála
- In office June 1981 – November 1992
- Constituency: Roscommon
- In office June 1977 – June 1981
- Constituency: Roscommon–Leitrim

Personal details
- Born: 1 October 1945 (age 81) Roscommon, County Roscommon, Ireland
- Party: Fianna Fáil
- Spouse: Mary O'Connor (m. 1972)
- Children: 4
- Education: University College Galway
- Website: terryleyden.com

Terry Leyden (born 1 October 1945) is an Irish former Fianna Fáil politician who served as a Senator (elected on the Labour Panel) from September 2002 to March 2020, and previously during December 1992 (after being nominated by the Taoiseach). He served as a Teachta Dála (TD) from 1977 to 1992, and as a Minister of State from March to December 1982, and from 1987 to 1992.

He was elected to Roscommon County Council in 1974, and re-elected in 1979 and 1985. Leyden was elected to Dáil Éireann at his first attempt, in the 1977 general election, when he was returned to the 21st Dáil as a TD for the Roscommon–Leitrim constituency. He was returned for the new Roscommon constituency at the 1981 general election, and re-elected a further four times before losing his seat at the 1992 general election in the new Longford–Roscommon constituency.

From March to December 1982, he served as Minister of State at the Department of Transport and Minister of State at the Department of Posts and Telegraphs. He then served as Minister of State at the Department of Health from 1987 to 1989, and as Minister of State at the Department of Industry and Commerce from 1989 to 1992.

Following his Dáil defeat he sat very briefly in the 19th Seanad, having been nominated by the Taoiseach Albert Reynolds on 3 December 1992. After the 19th Seanad last sat on 17 December 1992 he stood unsuccessfully in the 1993 election to Seanad Éireann on the Administrative Panel, and was unsuccessful again in 1997 when seeking election on the Industrial and Commercial Panel.

Leyden was re-elected to Roscommon County Council in 1999, a position that he held until the ending of the dual mandate in 2003 – because by that time he was also a Senator. Leyden was also a member of the Western Health Board from 1992 to 2002, and was chairman from 2001 to 2002.

He was elected to the 22nd Seanad on the Labour Panel in September 2002 and re-elected in 2007, 2011 and 2016. He was the Fianna Fáil Seanad spokesperson on Children and European Affairs.

In May 2010, he invoked Parliamentary privilege and accused The Irish Times columnist Fintan O'Toole of incitement to riot, which O'Toole denied. This came about as a result of the latter's addressing of a demonstration against the bank bailouts proposed by the government, which later turned violent.

In July 2013, he claimed that Adolf Hitler and Benito Mussolini were "good Christians" while speaking in the Seanad. On realising the absurd nature of his comments, he apologised to the chair and admitted he was distracted.

For many years, between 1992 and 2017, he was a member of the Irish delegation to the Parliamentary Assembly of the Council of Europe, headquartered in Strasbourg.

He was a member of the Royal Institute of the Architects of Ireland by virtue of inclusion on the "Minister's List". Prior to his inclusion on the RIAI register he was a member of the Irish Architects Society, the majority of whose members did not have formal qualifications for entry on the architect's register.

He was the Fianna Fáil Seanad spokesperson on Communications, Climate Change and Natural Resources. He retired from politics at the 2020 Seanad election.

In June 2024, he was appointed as an Honorary Consul for the Republic of Azerbaijan.

Dáil	Election	Deputy (Party)	Deputy (Party)	Deputy (Party)
19th	1969	Hugh Gibbons (FF)	Brian Lenihan (FF)	Joan Burke (FG)
20th	1973	Hugh Gibbons (FF)	Patrick J. Reynolds (FG)	Joan Burke (FG)
21st	1977	Terry Leyden (FF)	Seán Doherty (FF)	Joan Burke (FG)
22nd	1981	Constituency abolished. See Roscommon and Sligo–Leitrim		

Dáil	Election	Deputy (Party)	Deputy (Party)	Deputy (Party)	Deputy (Party)
4th	1923	George Noble Plunkett (Rep)	Henry Finlay (CnaG)	Gerald Boland (Rep)	Andrew Lavin (CnaG)
4th	1925 by-election	George Noble Plunkett (Rep)	Martin Conlon (CnaG)	Gerald Boland (Rep)	Andrew Lavin (CnaG)
5th	1927 (Jun)	Patrick O'Dowd (FF)	Martin Conlon (CnaG)	Gerald Boland (FF)	Michael Brennan (Ind.)
6th	1927 (Sep)	Patrick O'Dowd (FF)	Martin Conlon (CnaG)	Gerald Boland (FF)	Michael Brennan (Ind.)
7th	1932	Daniel O'Rourke (FF)	Martin Conlon (CnaG)	Gerald Boland (FF)	Frank MacDermot (NCP)
8th	1933	Patrick O'Dowd (FF)	Michael Brennan (CnaG)	Gerald Boland (FF)	Frank MacDermot (NCP)
9th	1937	Michael Brennan (FG)	Daniel O'Rourke (FF)	Gerald Boland (FF)	3 seats 1937–1948
10th	1938	Michael Brennan (FG)	Daniel O'Rourke (FF)	Gerald Boland (FF)	3 seats 1937–1948
11th	1943	John Meighan (CnaT)	John Beirne (CnaT)	Gerald Boland (FF)	3 seats 1937–1948
12th	1944	Daniel O'Rourke (FF)	John Beirne (CnaT)	Gerald Boland (FF)	3 seats 1937–1948
13th	1948	Daniel O'Rourke (FF)	John Beirne (CnaT)	Gerald Boland (FF)	Jack McQuillan (CnaP)
14th	1951	John Finan (CnaT)	John Beirne (CnaT)	Gerald Boland (FF)	Jack McQuillan (Ind.)
15th	1954	James Burke (FG)	John Beirne (CnaT)	Gerald Boland (FF)	Jack McQuillan (Ind.)
16th	1957	James Burke (FG)	John Beirne (CnaT)	Gerald Boland (FF)	Jack McQuillan (Ind.)
17th	1961	James Burke (FG)	Patrick J. Reynolds (FG)	Brian Lenihan Snr (FF)	Jack McQuillan (NPD)
17th	1964 by-election	Joan Burke (FG)	Patrick J. Reynolds (FG)	Brian Lenihan Snr (FF)	Jack McQuillan (NPD)
18th	1965	Joan Burke (FG)	Patrick J. Reynolds (FG)	Brian Lenihan Snr (FF)	Hugh Gibbons (FF)
19th	1969	Constituency abolished. See Roscommon–Leitrim			

Dáil	Election	Deputy (Party)	Deputy (Party)	Deputy (Party)
22nd	1981	Terry Leyden (FF)	Seán Doherty (FF)	John Connor (FG)
23rd	1982 (Feb)	Terry Leyden (FF)	Seán Doherty (FF)	Liam Naughten (FG)
24th	1982 (Nov)	Terry Leyden (FF)	Seán Doherty (FF)	Liam Naughten (FG)
25th	1987	Terry Leyden (FF)	Seán Doherty (FF)	Liam Naughten (FG)
26th	1989	Terry Leyden (FF)	Tom Foxe (Ind.)	John Connor (FG)
27th	1992	Constituency abolished. See Longford–Roscommon		
