= Mayo South–Roscommon South =

Dáil constituency (1921–1923)

- Former Dáil constituency

Former constituency
- Created: 1921
- Abolished: 1923
- Seats: 4
- Local government areas: County Mayo; County Roscommon
- Created from: South Mayo; South Roscommon
- Replaced by: Mayo South; Roscommon

Mayo South–Roscommon South was a parliamentary constituency represented in Dáil Éireann, the lower house of the Irish parliament or Oireachtas from 1921 to 1923. The constituency elected 4 deputies (Teachtaí Dála, commonly known as TDs) to the Dáil, on the system of proportional representation by means of the single transferable vote (PR-STV).

== History and boundaries ==
The constituency was created in 1921, under the Government of Ireland Act 1920, for the 1921 general election to the House of Commons of Southern Ireland, whose members formed the Second Dáil. It was used again for the 1922 general election to the 3rd Dáil. It covered part of the territory of the two counties of Mayo and Roscommon.

It was abolished under the Electoral Act 1923, and replaced by the two new constituencies of Mayo South and Roscommon.

== TDs ==
Teachtaí Dála (TDs) for Mayo South–Roscommon South 1921–1923
Key to parties: SF = Sinn Féin; AT-SF = Sinn Féin (Anti-Treaty); PT-SF = Sinn Féin (Pro-Treaty)
Dáil	Election	Deputy (Party)	Deputy (Party)	Deputy (Party)	Deputy (Party)
2nd	1921	Harry Boland (SF)	Tom Maguire (SF)	Daniel O'Rourke (SF)	William Sears (SF)
3rd	1922	Harry Boland (AT-SF)	Tom Maguire (AT-SF)	Daniel O'Rourke (PT-SF)	William Sears (PT-SF)
4th	1923	Constituency abolished. See Roscommon and Mayo South			

Note: The columns in this table are used only for presentational purposes, and no significance should be attached to the order of columns. For details of the order in which seats were won at each election, see the detailed results of that election.

== Elections ==
*: Outgoing TD

=== 1922 general election ===
1922 general election: Mayo South–Roscommon South (uncontested)
Party	Candidate
Sinn Féin (Anti-Treaty)	Harry Boland
Sinn Féin (Anti-Treaty)	Tom Maguire
Sinn Féin (Pro-Treaty)	Daniel O'Rourke
Sinn Féin (Pro-Treaty)	William Sears
Electorate: 45,223

=== 1921 general election ===
1921 general election: Mayo South–Roscommon South (uncontested)
Party	Candidate
Sinn Féin	Harry Boland
Sinn Féin	Tom Maguire
Sinn Féin	Daniel O'Rourke
Sinn Féin	William Sears

== See also ==
- Dáil constituencies
- Politics of the Republic of Ireland
- Historic Dáil constituencies
- Elections in the Republic of Ireland
