= Roscommon (Dáil constituency) =

Dáil constituency (1923–1969, 1981–1992)

- Former Dáil constituency

Former constituency
- Created: 1923
- Abolished: 1969
- Seats: 4 (1923–1937); 3 (1937–1948); 4 (1948–1969)
- Local government area: County Roscommon
- Created from: Leitrim–Roscommon North; Mayo South–Roscommon South
- Replaced by: Roscommon–Leitrim

Roscommon
- Former Dáil constituency

Former constituency
- Created: 1981
- Abolished: 1992
- Seats: 3
- Local government area: County Roscommon
- Created from: Roscommon–Leitrim
- Replaced by: Longford–Roscommon

Roscommon was a parliamentary constituency represented in Dáil Éireann, the lower house of the Irish parliament or Oireachtas from 1923 to 1969 and from 1981 to 1992. The method of election was proportional representation by means of the single transferable vote (PR-STV).

== History and boundaries ==
The constituency has had two separate periods of existence:

- from the 1923 general election until its abolition at the 1969 general election, when it was amalgamated into the Roscommon–Leitrim constituency, which in turn existed until the 1981 general election. At different periods it returned 4, 3 or 4 TDs. It comprised the administrative county of Roscommon.
- as a 3-seat constituency from the 1981 general election until its abolition at the 1992 general election to be replaced by the 4-seat constituency of Longford–Roscommon. It comprised the administrative county of Roscommon; and, in the administrative county of Galway, the district electoral divisions of: Ballinastack, Ballymoe, Ballynakill, Boyounagh, Creggs, Island, Kilcroan, Templetogher, Toberroe, in the former Rural District of Glennamaddy.

For the 2007 general election, the county was represented by the new Roscommon–South Leitrim constituency.

== TDs ==
=== TDs 1923–1969 ===
Teachtaí Dála (TDs) for Roscommon 1923–1969
Key to parties: CnaP = Clann na Poblachta; CnaT = Clann na Talmhan; CnaG = Cumann na nGaedheal; FF = Fianna Fáil; FG = Fine Gael; Ind. = Independent; Lab = Labour; NCP = National Centre Party; NPD = National Progressive Democrats; Rep = Republican
Dáil	Election	Deputy (Party)	Deputy (Party)	Deputy (Party)	Deputy (Party)
4th	1923	George Noble Plunkett (Rep)	Henry Finlay (CnaG)	Gerald Boland (Rep)	Andrew Lavin (CnaG)
4th	1925 by-election	George Noble Plunkett (Rep)	Martin Conlon (CnaG)	Gerald Boland (Rep)	Andrew Lavin (CnaG)
5th	1927 (Jun)	Patrick O'Dowd (FF)	Martin Conlon (CnaG)	Gerald Boland (FF)	Michael Brennan (Ind.)
6th	1927 (Sep)	Patrick O'Dowd (FF)	Martin Conlon (CnaG)	Gerald Boland (FF)	Michael Brennan (Ind.)
7th	1932	Daniel O'Rourke (FF)	Martin Conlon (CnaG)	Gerald Boland (FF)	Frank MacDermot (NCP)
8th	1933	Patrick O'Dowd (FF)	Michael Brennan (CnaG)	Gerald Boland (FF)	Frank MacDermot (NCP)
9th	1937	Michael Brennan (FG)	Daniel O'Rourke (FF)	Gerald Boland (FF)	3 seats 1937–1948
10th	1938	Michael Brennan (FG)	Daniel O'Rourke (FF)	Gerald Boland (FF)	3 seats 1937–1948
11th	1943	John Meighan (CnaT)	John Beirne (CnaT)	Gerald Boland (FF)	3 seats 1937–1948
12th	1944	Daniel O'Rourke (FF)	John Beirne (CnaT)	Gerald Boland (FF)	3 seats 1937–1948
13th	1948	Daniel O'Rourke (FF)	John Beirne (CnaT)	Gerald Boland (FF)	Jack McQuillan (CnaP)
14th	1951	John Finan (CnaT)	John Beirne (CnaT)	Gerald Boland (FF)	Jack McQuillan (Ind.)
15th	1954	James Burke (FG)	John Beirne (CnaT)	Gerald Boland (FF)	Jack McQuillan (Ind.)
16th	1957	James Burke (FG)	John Beirne (CnaT)	Gerald Boland (FF)	Jack McQuillan (Ind.)
17th	1961	James Burke (FG)	Patrick J. Reynolds (FG)	Brian Lenihan Snr (FF)	Jack McQuillan (NPD)
17th	1964 by-election	Joan Burke (FG)	Patrick J. Reynolds (FG)	Brian Lenihan Snr (FF)	Jack McQuillan (NPD)
18th	1965	Joan Burke (FG)	Patrick J. Reynolds (FG)	Brian Lenihan Snr (FF)	Hugh Gibbons (FF)
19th	1969	Constituency abolished. See Roscommon–Leitrim			

Note: The columns in this table are used only for presentational purposes, and no significance should be attached to the order of columns. For details of the order in which seats were won at each election, see the detailed results of that election.

=== TDs 1981–1992 ===
Teachtaí Dála (TDs) for Roscommon 1981–1992
Key to parties: FF = Fianna Fáil; FG = Fine Gael; Ind. = Independent
Dáil	Election	Deputy (Party)	Deputy (Party)	Deputy (Party)
22nd	1981	Terry Leyden (FF)	Seán Doherty (FF)	John Connor (FG)
23rd	1982 (Feb)	Terry Leyden (FF)	Seán Doherty (FF)	Liam Naughten (FG)
24th	1982 (Nov)	Terry Leyden (FF)	Seán Doherty (FF)	Liam Naughten (FG)
25th	1987	Terry Leyden (FF)	Seán Doherty (FF)	Liam Naughten (FG)
26th	1989	Terry Leyden (FF)	Tom Foxe (Ind.)	John Connor (FG)
27th	1992	Constituency abolished. See Longford–Roscommon		

Note: The columns in this table are used only for presentational purposes, and no significance should be attached to the order of columns. For details of the order in which seats were won at each election, see the detailed results of that election.

== Elections ==
*: Outgoing TD

=== 1989 general election ===
1989 general election: Roscommon
Party	Candidate	FPv%	Count		
Party	Candidate	FPv%	1	2	3
Fine Gael	John Connor	22.1	6,823	7,306	7,749
Independent	Tom Foxe	22.1	6,811	7,521	8,400
Fianna Fáil	Terry Leyden	20.8	6,424	10,228	
Fine Gael	Liam Naughten	17.6	5,435	5,639	6,196
Fianna Fáil	Seán Doherty	17.1	5,281		
Independent	Andrew Kerrigan	0.4	119		
Electorate: 40,447 Valid: 30,893 Quota: 7,724 Turnout: 76.4%

=== 1987 general election ===
1987 general election: Roscommon
Party	Candidate	FPv%	Count			
Party	Candidate	FPv%	1	2	3	4
Fianna Fáil	Seán Doherty	27.6	8,944			
Fianna Fáil	Terry Leyden	22.4	7,257	8,812		
Fine Gael	John Connor	19.0	6,144	7,163	7,625	7,876
Fine Gael	Liam Naughten	18.4	5,949	7,047	7,438	7,894
Independent	Eithne Quinn	12.6	4,067			
Electorate: 41,515 Valid: 32,361 Quota: 8,091 Turnout: 77.9%

=== November 1982 general election ===
November 1982 general election: Roscommon
Party	Candidate	FPv%	Count		
Party	Candidate	FPv%	1	2	3
Fianna Fáil	Seán Doherty	28.5	9,362		
Fianna Fáil	Terry Leyden	24.8	8,121	8,342	
Fine Gael	Liam Naughten	22.4	7,338	8,072	8,646
Fine Gael	John Connor	15.8	5,177	6,976	7,562
Fine Gael	Thomas Callan	8.6	2,806		
Electorate: 40,664 Valid: 32,804 Quota: 8,202 Turnout: 80.7%

=== February 1982 general election ===
February 1982 general election: Roscommon
Party	Candidate	FPv%	Count		
Party	Candidate	FPv%	1	2	3
Fianna Fáil	Seán Doherty	28.1	8,936		
Fianna Fáil	Terry Leyden	26.6	8,450		
Fine Gael	Liam Naughten	23.6	7,502	7,940	8,311
Fine Gael	John Connor	21.7	6,897	7,448	7,580
Electorate: 40,249 Valid: 31,785 Quota: 7,947 Turnout: 79.0%

=== 1981 general election ===
1981 general election: Roscommon
Party	Candidate	FPv%	Count						
Party	Candidate	FPv%	1	2	3	4	5	6	7
Fianna Fáil	Seán Doherty	26.9	8,918						
Fianna Fáil	Terry Leyden	21.4	7,095	7,590	7,862	8,583			
Fine Gael	Liam Naughten	14.6	4,845	4,852	4,886	4,956	5,837	7,168	7,214
Fine Gael	John Connor	14.2	4,717	4,739	4,906	5,232	5,341	7,430	7,589
Fine Gael	Charles Duignan	10.6	3,505	3,557	3,640	3,751	3,853		
Independent	Patrick Lenihan	5.3	1,771	1,793	1,832	2,165			
Independent	Patrick Moylan	4.7	1,569	1,583	1,684				
Independent	Tom McGarry	1.9	633	648					
Independent	Patrick Greaney	0.3	100	102					
Electorate: 40,249 Valid: 33,153 Quota: 8,289 Turnout: 82.4%

=== 1965 general election ===
1965 general election: Roscommon
Party	Candidate	FPv%	Count				
Party	Candidate	FPv%	1	2	3	4	5
Fine Gael	Joan Burke	26.9	9,467				
Fianna Fáil	Brian Lenihan Snr	21.7	7,616				
Fine Gael	Patrick J. Reynolds	13.9	4,870	5,438	5,449	7,124	
Labour	Jack McQuillan	12.7	4,449	4,806	4,870	5,383	5,749
Fianna Fáil	Hugh Gibbons	11.0	3,882	3,980	4,406	4,497	7,542
Fianna Fáil	Willie Farrell	10.4	3,659	3,705	3,774	3,971	
Fine Gael	Michael Fallon	3.5	1,217	2,582	2,595		
Electorate: 44,635 Valid: 35,160 Quota: 7,033 Turnout: 78.8%

=== 1964 by-election ===
Following the death of Fine Gael TD James Burke, a by-election was held on 8 July 1964. The seat was won by the Fine Gael candidate Joan Burke, widow of the deceased TD.

1964 by-election: Roscommon
Party	Candidate	FPv%	Count	
Party	Candidate	FPv%	1	2
Fine Gael	Joan Burke	49.7	17,308	18,754
Fianna Fáil	Hugh Gibbons	43.4	15,107	15,673
Labour	Oliver Macklin	5.9	2,056	
Sinn Féin	Pádraig Ó Ceallaigh	1.0	352	
Electorate: 44,635 Valid: 34,823 Quota: 17,412 Turnout: 78.0%

=== 1961 general election ===
1961 general election: Roscommon
Party	Candidate	FPv%	Count								
Party	Candidate	FPv%	1	2	3	4	5	6	7	8	9
National Progressive Democrats	Jack McQuillan	15.1	5,289	5,327	5,535	5,705	6,352	7,011			
Fianna Fáil	Brian Lenihan Snr	13.9	4,873	4,884	4,942	4,988	5,090	5,229	5,791	6,073	6,197
Fine Gael	James Burke	13.6	4,753	4,763	4,800	5,225	5,513	5,682	5,709	7,812	
Fine Gael	Patrick J. Reynolds	10.7	3,754	4,119	4,226	4,433	4,525	4,957	5,890	6,335	6,975
Fianna Fáil	Gerald Boland	10.4	3,634	3,645	3,679	3,739	3,864	4,096	4,838	5,298	5,346
Clann na Talmhan	John Beirne	9.2	3,211	3,225	3,322	3,564	3,843	4,410	4,486		
Fianna Fáil	Peter Charles	6.7	2,331	2,602	2,685	2,699	2,724	2,844			
Independent	James Doherty	5.6	1,975	2,097	2,335	2,612	2,683				
Clann na Poblachta	Peter McGuinness	4.6	1,603	1,616	1,767	1,779					
Fine Gael	Rose Shannon	4.2	1,467	1,472	1,483						
Sinn Féin	Sylvester Fitzsimons	3.3	1,138	1,200							
Independent	Richard Ellis	2.8	968								
Electorate: 45,369 Valid: 34,996 Quota: 7,000 Turnout: 77.1%

=== 1957 general election ===
1957 general election: Roscommon
Party	Candidate	FPv%	Count							
Party	Candidate	FPv%	1	2	3	4	5	6	7	8
Clann na Talmhan	John Beirne	13.8	4,222	4,327	4,515	4,640	5,810	5,899	6,405	
Independent	Jack McQuillan	13.3	4,075	4,116	4,285	4,589	4,836	5,023	6,562	
Fine Gael	James Burke	12.8	3,914	3,937	4,024	4,251	4,775	4,881	5,162	5,408
Fianna Fáil	Brian Lenihan Snr	11.1	3,393	3,400	3,712	3,783	3,852	4,410	4,843	5,032
Fianna Fáil	Gerald Boland	10.7	3,288	3,350	4,040	4,092	4,129	6,150		
Fianna Fáil	Daniel O'Rourke	9.2	2,805	2,833	3,054	3,222	3,357			
Sinn Féin	Seán Scott	8.9	2,741	2,894	3,007	3,238	3,379	3,517		
Clann na Talmhan	Paddy Concannon	6.7	2,043	2,054	2,067	2,505				
Fianna Fáil	Walter McGuire	5.9	1,813	1,834						
Labour	James Connaughton	5.7	1,756	1,872	1,879					
Labour	James Regan	1.9	583							
Electorate: 41,131 Valid: 30,633 Quota: 6,127 Turnout: 74.5%

=== 1954 general election ===
1954 general election: Roscommon
Party	Candidate	FPv%	Count								
Party	Candidate	FPv%	1	2	3	4	5	6	7	8	9
Fianna Fáil	Gerald Boland	16.4	5,456	5,470	5,542	5,579	7,190				
Clann na Talmhan	John Beirne	14.7	4,894	4,912	4,999	5,424	5,862	5,889	8,745		
Independent	Jack McQuillan	14.3	4,756	4,800	5,081	5,236	5,518	5,542	5,916	6,284	6,734
Fine Gael	James Burke	13.7	4,549	4,589	4,777	5,026	5,124	5,135	6,077	7,756	
Clann na Talmhan	John Finan	13.1	4,337	4,380	4,425	4,541	4,577	4,583			
Fianna Fáil	Daniel O'Rourke	10.9	3,629	3,637	3,698	3,728	4,700	5,181	5,362	5,419	5,446
Fianna Fáil	Peter Lynch	10.4	3,447	3,459	3,506	3,552					
Clann na Poblachta	John Scott	2.7	901	1,041	1,140						
Labour	Andrew Treacy	2.7	894	906							
Clann na Poblachta	Michael Garvey	1.0	339								
Electorate: 42,470 Valid: 33,202 Quota: 6,641 Turnout: 78.2%

=== 1951 general election ===
1951 general election: Roscommon
Party	Candidate	FPv%	Count						
Party	Candidate	FPv%	1	2	3	4	5	6	7
Clann na Talmhan	John Beirne	18.4	6,269	6,796	7,683				
Fianna Fáil	Gerald Boland	14.6	4,980	5,072	5,180	5,202	6,655	6,786	6,831
Fianna Fáil	Daniel O'Rourke	13.8	4,710	4,732	4,828	4,843	5,946	6,090	6,129
Clann na Talmhan	John Finan	12.9	4,408	4,558	5,320	5,746	5,771	7,556	
Independent	Jack McQuillan	10.8	3,666	3,772	4,290	4,400	4,748	5,768	6,298
Fianna Fáil	John J. Smyth	8.9	3,036	3,045	3,083	3,092			
Clann na Poblachta	Michael Kelly	8.1	2,751	2,962					
Fine Gael	Michael Brennan	7.5	2,551	3,101	3,546	3,725	3,802		
Fine Gael	Patrick J. Flynn	5.0	1,691						
Electorate: 44,017 Valid: 34,062 Quota: 6,813 Turnout: 77.38%

=== 1948 general election ===
1948 general election: Roscommon
Party	Candidate	FPv%	Count							
Party	Candidate	FPv%	1	2	3	4	5	6	7	8
Fianna Fáil	Gerald Boland	21.5	7,581							
Fianna Fáil	Daniel O'Rourke	13.7	4,841	5,039	5,065	5,101	5,131	5,178	5,340	7,948
Clann na Talmhan	John Beirne	12.7	4,470	4,484	4,549	4,987	5,416	5,514	6,135	6,774
Fianna Fáil	Peter Lynch	10.3	3,633	3,846	3,857	3,890	3,918	3,999	4,124	
Clann na Talmhan	John Finan	10.2	3,604	3,609	3,671	3,892	4,095	4,254	4,647	4,679
Clann na Poblachta	Jack McQuillan	8.6	3,025	3,041	3,087	3,252	3,449	5,814	6,862	7,277
Clann na Poblachta	Michael Kelly	7.5	2,660	2,670	2,698	2,731	2,861			
Independent	Michael Brennan	6.7	2,370	2,405	2,490	2,777	3,138	3,177		
Fine Gael	Martin Conlon	3.6	1,255	1,263	1,511	1,555				
Clann na Talmhan	Matthew Davis	3.4	1,216	1,232	1,301					
Fine Gael	Peter Farrell	1.9	655	659						
Electorate: 46,197 Valid: 35,310 Quota: 7,062 Turnout: 76.43%

=== 1944 general election ===
1944 general election: Roscommon
Party	Candidate	FPv%	Count			
Party	Candidate	FPv%	1	2	3	4
Fianna Fáil	Gerald Boland	25.5	7,800			
Fianna Fáil	Daniel O'Rourke	23.0	7,044	7,358	7,493	7,874
Clann na Talmhan	John Beirne	17.5	5,359	5,521	6,349	7,213
Clann na Talmhan	John Meighan	15.1	4,629	4,920	5,836	6,583
Fine Gael	Michael Brennan	7.8	2,394	2,505	2,811	
Clann na Talmhan	Patrick Farrell	7.1	2,189	2,294		
Ailtirí na hAiséirghe	Joseph O'Kelly	4.0	1,217			
Electorate: 41,518 Valid: 30,632 Quota: 7,659 Turnout: 73.8%

=== 1943 general election ===
1943 general election: Roscommon
Party	Candidate	FPv%	Count				
Party	Candidate	FPv%	1	2	3	4	5
Fianna Fáil	Gerald Boland	22.2	7,091	7,186	7,784	8,423	
Fianna Fáil	Daniel O'Rourke	20.4	6,522	6,562	6,860	7,098	7,296
Clann na Talmhan	John Meighan	16.0	5,122	6,194	6,722	7,651	7,686
Clann na Talmhan	John Beirne	15.4	4,903	5,345	5,903	7,234	7,352
Fine Gael	Michael Brennan	10.2	3,261	3,416	4,141		
Labour	John Doran	9.8	3,132	3,205			
Clann na Talmhan	Thomas O'Donnell	6.0	1,902				
Electorate: 41,518 Valid: 31,933 Quota: 7,984 Turnout: 76.9%

=== 1938 general election ===
1938 general election: Roscommon
Party	Candidate	FPv%	Count	
Party	Candidate	FPv%	1	2
Fianna Fáil	Gerald Boland	33.8	10,719	
Fianna Fáil	Daniel O'Rourke	26.0	8,223	
Fine Gael	Michael Brennan	20.7	6,547	7,800
Fine Gael	Dudley Costello	19.6	6,200	6,636
Electorate: 41,620 Valid: 31,689 Quota: 7,923 Turnout: 76.1%

=== 1937 general election ===
1937 general election: Roscommon
Party	Candidate	FPv%	Count			
Party	Candidate	FPv%	1	2	3	4
Fianna Fáil	Gerald Boland	28.4	8,925			
Fine Gael	Michael Brennan	26.4	8,295			
Fianna Fáil	Daniel O'Rourke	18.4	5,774	6,638	6,647	8,387
Fine Gael	Dudley Costello	15.3	4,806	4,850	5,266	5,822
Independent	Patrick O'Dowd	11.5	3,599	3,766	3,786	
Electorate: 42,103 Valid: 31,399 Quota: 7,850 Turnout: 74.6%

=== 1933 general election ===
1933 general election: Roscommon
Party	Candidate	FPv%	Count				
Party	Candidate	FPv%	1	2	3	4	5
Fianna Fáil	Gerald Boland	20.8	8,246				
Fianna Fáil	Patrick O'Dowd	20.6	8,160				
National Centre Party	Frank MacDermot	19.4	7,703	7,712	7,716	8,975	
Fianna Fáil	Daniel O'Rourke	18.1	7,190	7,475	7,697	7,748	7,780
Cumann na nGaedheal	Michael Brennan	11.5	4,568	4,585	4,586	6,990	8,003
Cumann na nGaedheal	Martin Conlon	9.5	3,781	3,786	3,789		
Electorate: 48,958 Valid: 39,648 Quota: 7,930 Turnout: 81.0%

=== 1932 general election ===
Details of the fifth count are not available. Gallagher notes it is unclear as to why the returning officer proceeded with the elimination of O'Dowd on the final count.

1932 general election: Roscommon
Party	Candidate	FPv%	Count					
Party	Candidate	FPv%	1	2	3	4	5	6
Fianna Fáil	Daniel O'Rourke	18.7	6,606	6,723	6,779	6,821	N/A	10,289
Fianna Fáil	Patrick O'Dowd	17.9	6,314	6,353	6,421	6,521	N/A	
Fianna Fáil	Gerald Boland	17.5	6,189	6,230	6,486	6,604	N/A	9,237
Cumann na nGaedheal	Martin Conlon	13.3	4,715	6,116	9,777			
Independent	Frank MacDermot	12.9	4,560	5,050	5,667	7,490		
Cumann na nGaedheal	Michael Brennan	11.5	4,077	4,817				
Cumann na nGaedheal	Michael Grogan	8.2	2,897					
Electorate: 48,403 Valid: 35,358 Quota: 7,072 Turnout: 73.1%

=== September 1927 general election ===
September 1927 general election: Roscommon
Party	Candidate	FPv%	Count						
Party	Candidate	FPv%	1	2	3	4	5	6	7
Fianna Fáil	Gerald Boland	16.3	5,417	5,496	5,520	5,521	5,945	8,108	
Fianna Fáil	Patrick O'Dowd	15.9	5,289	5,479	5,569	5,571	5,754	6,933	
Cumann na nGaedheal	Martin Conlon	14.9	4,959	5,126	6,883				
Independent	Michael Brennan	11.6	3,844	4,593	4,742	4,763	5,528	5,615	5,736
Fianna Fáil	Daniel O'Rourke	10.3	3,424	3,472	3,497	3,499	3,616		
Cumann na nGaedheal	Joseph Burke	9.2	3,050	3,180	3,445	3,652	4,844	4,903	4,947
Independent	John Doran	9.0	2,987	3,146	3,267	3,278			
Cumann na nGaedheal	Andrew Lavin	7.0	2,326	2,522					
Independent	John Keaveney	5.7	1,895						
Electorate: 50,586 Valid: 33,191 Quota: 6,639 Turnout: 65.6%

=== June 1927 general election ===
June 1927 general election: Roscommon
Party	Candidate	FPv%	Count									
Party	Candidate	FPv%	1	2	3	4	5	6	7	8	9	10
Fianna Fáil	Gerald Boland	18.0	5,615	5,641	6,306							
Independent	Michael Brennan	13.3	4,151	4,270	4,317	4,319	4,367	5,099	5,300	5,878	7,503	
Cumann na nGaedheal	Martin Conlon	12.0	3,734	3,969	3,974	3,975	3,989	4,133	5,374	5,769	6,099	6,302
Fianna Fáil	Patrick O'Dowd	9.6	3,000	3,027	3,257	3,328	4,520	4,606	4,666	5,114	5,406	5,492
Independent	John Keaveney	8.0	2,500	2,652	2,672	2,672	2,717	2,803	2,964	3,281		
Cumann na nGaedheal	John Doran	7.5	2,341	2,432	2,445	2,446	2,472	2,611	2,934	3,417	3,627	3,725
Labour	Thomas Larkin	7.3	2,256	2,326	2,353	2,355	2,434	2,751	2,887			
Cumann na nGaedheal	Andrew Lavin	6.3	1,963	2,194	2,208	2,208	2,232	2,351				
Independent	Michael Killian	5.9	1,834	1,847	1,877	1,878	1,902					
Sinn Féin	George Noble Plunkett	5.1	1,575	1,584	1,603	1,609						
Fianna Fáil	Séamus Duffy	3.6	1,108	1,114								
Cumann na nGaedheal	James Flanagan	3.3	1,032									
Electorate: 50,586 Valid: 31,109 Quota: 6,222 Turnout: 61.5%

=== 1925 by-election ===
Following the resignation of Cumann na nGaedheal TD Henry Finlay, a by-election was held on 11 March 1925. The seat was won by the Cumann na nGaedheal candidate Martin Conlon.

1925 by-election: Roscommon
Party	Candidate	FPv%	Count
Party	Candidate	FPv%	1
Cumann na nGaedheal	Martin Conlon	61.2	21,118
Republican	John J. O'Kelly	38.8	13,410
Electorate: 52,929 Valid: 34,528 Quota: 17,265 Turnout: 65.2%

=== 1923 general election ===
1923 general election: Roscommon
Party	Candidate	FPv%	Count										
Party	Candidate	FPv%	1	2	3	4	5	6	7	8	9	10	11
Republican	George Noble Plunkett	17.7	5,507	5,537	5,567	5,658	5,893	6,879					
Cumann na nGaedheal	Andrew Lavin	16.0	5,001	5,073	5,205	5,210	5,372	5,453	5,470	5,638	5,965	6,306	
Republican	Gerald Boland	12.3	3,843	3,857	3,866	4,288	4,321	4,455	5,002	5,066	5,492	5,630	5,675
Cumann na nGaedheal	Henry Finlay	12.3	3,827	3,879	3,919	3,947	3,990	4,002	4,007	4,205	4,568	5,137	6,489
Cumann na nGaedheal	Patrick Dyar	7.2	2,253	2,375	2,453	2,466	2,490	2,502	2,509	2,561	2,691	2,865	
Cumann na nGaedheal	Patrick Dorr	6.1	1,906	1,926	1,974	2,034	2,079	2,090	2,098	2,475	2,531	3,002	3,759
Farmers' Party	Michael Brennan	5.5	1,711	1,745	1,853	1,869	1,919	1,933	1,946	2,438	2,523		
Labour	Liam Kelleher	5.0	1,545	1,673	1,690	1,717	1,791	1,848	1,875	1,929			
Farmers' Party	Edward Cline	4.5	1,397	1,422	1,584	1,617	1,675	1,691	1,706				
Republican	James Moran	3.9	1,205	1,216	1,234	1,339	1,395						
Republican	Gerald Davis	2.7	839	842	849								
Independent	Jasper Tully	2.6	811	869	901	905							
Farmers' Party	John Drury	2.3	716	739									
Independent	Henry Fitzgibbon	2.0	636										
Electorate: 53,710 Valid: 31,197 Quota: 6,240 Turnout: 58.1%

== See also ==
- Dáil constituencies
- Politics of the Republic of Ireland
- Historic Dáil constituencies
- Elections in the Republic of Ireland
