= Séamus McFerran =

Gaelic games administrator

Séamus McFerran (10 January 1916 – 31 August 1968) was the 18th president of the Gaelic Athletic Association (1955–1958).

McFerran born in Belfast, was elected chairman on the Antrim County Board in 1944, and was the Antrim delegate to the Ulster Council for several years, and was chairman of the Ulster Council from 1949 to 1951.

McFerran was a co-founding member of the Geraldines GAA club in Belfast.

During his presidency, he opened Pearse Stadium on 16 June 1957. Known for his love of singing, he was a member of a Belfast choir that won the Welsh Festival competition, and toured America twice.

The Séamus McFerran Cup, given to the winners of the Ulster Senior Club Football Championship was donated by the Ulster Council in his memory in 1968.

This article incorporates text available under the CC BY 3.0 license.

Sporting positions
Preceded by Vincent O'Donoghue	President of the Gaelic Athletic Association; 1955–1958	Succeeded by Joseph Stuart
