= Roscommon–Leitrim =

Dáil constituency (1969–1981)

- Former Dáil constituency

Former constituency
- Created: 1969
- Abolished: 1981
- Seats: 3
- Local government area: County Roscommon; County Leitrim
- Created from: Roscommon; Sligo–Leitrim
- Replaced by: Roscommon; Sligo–Leitrim

Roscommon–Leitrim was a parliamentary constituency represented in Dáil Éireann, the lower house of the Irish parliament or Oireachtas from 1969 to 1981. The constituency elected 3 deputies (Teachtaí Dála, commonly known as TDs) to the Dáil, on the system of proportional representation by means of the single transferable vote (PR-STV).

== History ==
The constituency was created under the Electoral (Amendment) Act 1969, and first used for the 1969 general election. It replaced the previous Roscommon constituency and part of the Sligo–Leitrim constituency.

Its boundaries were revised in 1977, but the number of seats remained unchanged. The constituency was abolished for the 1981 general election, when its territory was divided between the existing Sligo–Leitrim constituency and a new Roscommon constituency.

== Boundaries ==
It covered most of the County Roscommon and part of County Leitrim.

Changes to the Roscommon–Leitrim constituency
Years	TDs	Boundaries	Law	Notes
1969–1977	3	All of County Roscommon, except the parts thereof which are comprised in the constituencies of Clare–South Galway and Galway North-East; In County Leitrim, the parts of the former Rural District of Carrick-on-Shannon No. 1.; parts of the former Rural District of Mohill; In County Westmeath, the district electoral divisions of Athlone West Urban.	Electoral (Amendment) Act 1969	Constituency created. The following areas in Galway North-East: in the administrative county of Roscommon, parts of the former Rural District of Athlone No. 2; parts of the former Rural District of Castlereagh; parts of the former Rural District of Roscommon.; The following areas in Clare–South Galway: in the administrative county of Roscommon, parts of the former Rural District of Athlone No. 2.
1977–1981	3	Boundaries more closely aligned with county boundaries, and defined as: The administrative county of Roscommon, except the part, thereof which is comprised in the constituency of Mayo East; and the administrative county of Leitrim, except the part thereof which is comprised in the constituency of Sligo–Leitrim.	Electoral (Amendment) Act 1974	The following parts of Roscommon in Mayo East: parts of the former Rural District of Castlereagh; The following parts of Leitrim in Sligo–Leitrim: the district electoral divisions of: parts of the former Rural District of Kinlough, in the coastal northern area of Leitrim; Most of the former Rural District of Manorhamilton, including Arigna.
1981	—	Constituency abolished.	Electoral (Amendment) Act 1980	The two counties now represented through the constituencies of Roscommon–South Leitrim and Sligo–North Leitrim

== TDs ==
Teachtaí Dála (TDs) for Roscommon–Leitrim 1969–1981
Key to parties: FF = Fianna Fáil; FG = Fine Gael
Dáil	Election	Deputy (Party)	Deputy (Party)	Deputy (Party)
19th	1969	Hugh Gibbons (FF)	Brian Lenihan (FF)	Joan Burke (FG)
20th	1973	Hugh Gibbons (FF)	Patrick J. Reynolds (FG)	Joan Burke (FG)
21st	1977	Terry Leyden (FF)	Seán Doherty (FF)	Joan Burke (FG)
22nd	1981	Constituency abolished. See Roscommon and Sligo–Leitrim		

Note: The columns in this table are used only for presentational purposes, and no significance should be attached to the order of columns. For details of the order in which seats were won at each election, see the detailed results of that election.

== Elections ==
*: Outgoing TD

=== 1977 general election ===
1977 general election: Roscommon–Leitrim
Party	Candidate	FPv%	Count						
Party	Candidate	FPv%	1	2	3	4	5	6	7
Fine Gael	Joan Burke	22.1	7,862	7,913	8,082	8,274	10,208		
Fianna Fáil	Terry Leyden	18.5	6,563	6,607	6,638	6,660	7,017	7,139	8,986
Fianna Fáil	Seán Doherty	16.8	5,968	6,056	6,124	6,167	6,211	6,225	9,109
Fine Gael	Patrick J. Reynolds	16.3	5,802	5,815	5,873	5,953	6,212	7,381	8,096
Fianna Fáil	John Ellis	15.5	5,496	5,547	5,578	5,682	5,720	5,731	
Fine Gael	Liam Naughten	7.4	2,624	2,636	2,678	2,718			
Independent	James Reynolds	1.4	502	521	536				
Labour	Connie Fallon	1.1	395	444					
Independent	Desmond Curley	1.0	355						
Electorate: 43,958 Valid: 35,567 Quota: 8,892 Turnout: 80.9%

=== 1973 general election ===
1973 general election: Roscommon–Leitrim
Party	Candidate	FPv%	Count						
Party	Candidate	FPv%	1	2	3	4	5	6	7
Fine Gael	Joan Burke	25.4	7,241						
Fianna Fáil	Hugh Gibbons	20.0	5,689	5,695	5,720	5,776	5,902	6,916	7,119
Fianna Fáil	Brian Lenihan	19.5	5,548	5,553	5,587	5,647	5,760	6,234	6,318
Fine Gael	Patrick J. Reynolds	16.5	4,706	4,740	4,974	5,076	5,306	5,536	7,253
Fine Gael	Gerald Dodd	6.3	1,801	1,871	1,979	2,036	2,283	2,295	
Fianna Fáil	Farrell McElgunn	6.0	1,704	1,704	1,720	1,728	1,771		
Sinn Féin	Frances Grehan	2.7	770	772	832	1,006			
Independent	Thomas McCrann	1.8	513	515	533				
Labour	Tony O'Connell	1.8	503	506					
Electorate: 37,682 Valid: 28,475 Quota: 7,119 Turnout: 75.6%

=== 1969 general election ===
1969 general election: Roscommon–Leitrim
Party	Candidate	FPv%	Count							
Party	Candidate	FPv%	1	2	3	4	5	6	7	8
Fine Gael	Joan Burke	26.7	8,102							
Fianna Fáil	Brian Lenihan	22.7	6,867	6,895	6,906	7,008	7,181	7,428	8,280	
Fianna Fáil	Hugh Gibbons	17.4	5,282	5,318	5,349	5,365	5,420	5,645	6,860	7,502
Fine Gael	Patrick J. Reynolds	15.1	4,574	4,771	4,826	4,858	5,736	6,207	6,567	6,628
Fianna Fáil	Farrell McElgunn	8.2	2,467	2,471	2,480	2,494	2,528	2,575		
Labour	Peter McGuinness	3.8	1,163	1,188	1,246	1,612	1,654			
Fine Gael	Thomas Kilroy	3.3	1,009	1,233	1,241	1,338				
Labour	Neil O'Shea	2.0	610	618	675					
Labour	James Nolan	0.8	232	235						
Electorate: 38,461 Valid: 30,306 Quota: 7,577 Turnout: 78.8%

== See also ==
- Dáil constituencies
- Politics of the Republic of Ireland
- Historic Dáil constituencies
- Elections in the Republic of Ireland
