= Tom Maguire =

Irish politician and republican (1892–1993)

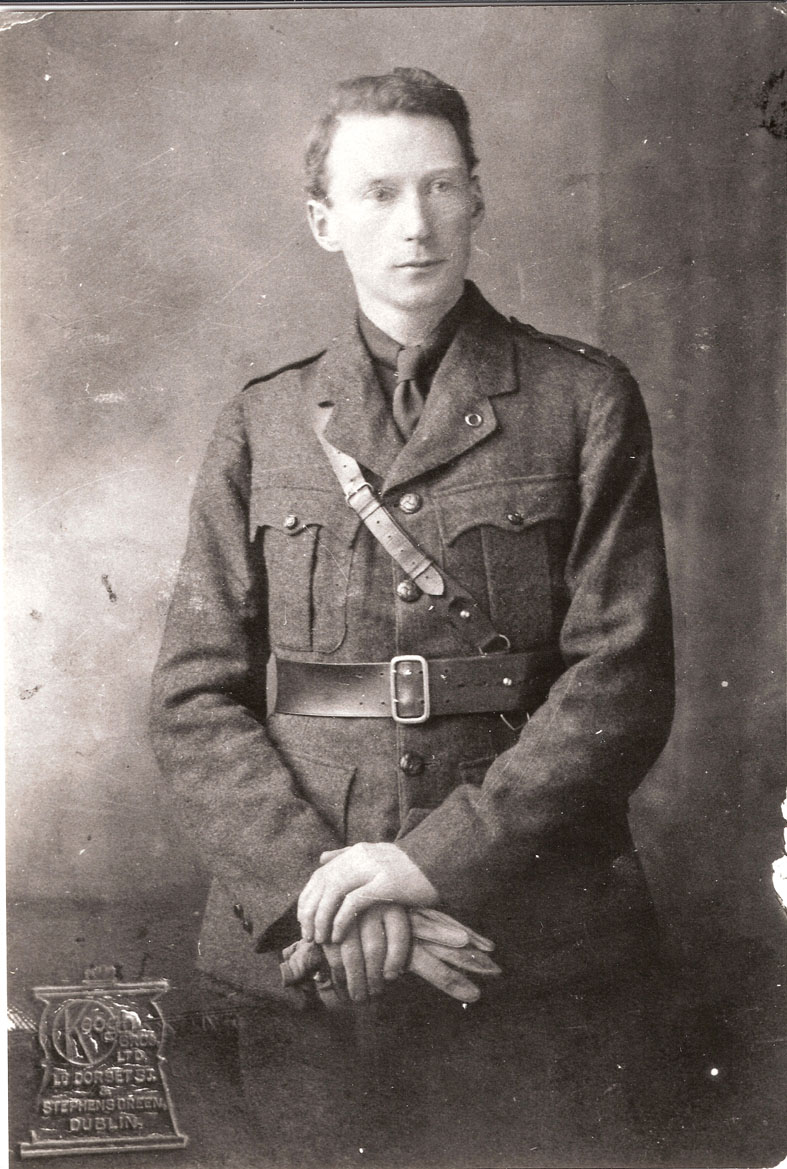

Teachta Dála
- In office August 1923 – June 1927
- Constituency: Mayo South
- In office May 1921 – August 1923
- Constituency: Mayo South–Roscommon South

Vice-President of Sinn Féin
- In office 1935–1937
- Leader: Cathal Ó Murchadha

Personal details
- Born: 28 March 1892 Cross, County Mayo, Ireland
- Died: 5 June 1993 (aged 101) Castlebar, County Mayo, Ireland
- Resting place: Cross, County Mayo, Ireland
- Party: Sinn Féin
- Spouse: Ann Feeney (m. 1925)
- Children: 5

Military service
- Branch/service: Irish Republican Army; Anti-Treaty IRA
- Rank: Commandant-general
- Unit: South Mayo Brigade
- Battles/wars: Irish War of Independence; Irish Civil War

British Army military intelligence file for Thomas Maguire

Thomas Maguire (28 March 1892 – 5 July 1993) was an Irish republican who held the rank of commandant-general in the Western Command of the Irish Republican Army (IRA) and led the South Mayo flying column.

== Early life ==
Maguire was born 28 March 1892 in Cross, County Mayo, the fourth of eleven children of William Maguire, and Mary Grehan. He joined the Irish Volunteers on their foundation in 1913, and after the 1916 Easter rising, he formed the first company of Volunteers in Cross in 1917. He was elected as a member of Mayo County Council in June 1920 and was subsequently chairman of Ballinrobe district council.

== Irish Republican Army ==
On 18 September 1920, the Mayo Brigade was reorganised, it was split up into four separate brigades. Maguire was appointed commander of the South Mayo Brigade.

On 3 May 1921, Maguire led an ambush on a Royal Irish Constabulary (RIC) patrol in Toormakeady, County Mayo, killing five members of the RIC. Maguire's flying column then made for the Partry Mountains. One account claimed that the column were surrounded by over 700 soldiers and policemen guided by aeroplanes. Maguire was wounded and his adjutant (Michael O'Brien) killed, but the column managed to escape with no further casualties. British casualties were not revealed but were believed to have been high. The action of that day resulted in the abandonment of several RIC garrisons in the area. Some recent research has raised the possibility that fewer than forty British soldiers were in the vicinity and that Maguire's column was forced to abandon their weapons with only one British officer wounded.

Maguire was involved in numerous other engagements including the Kilfall ambush.

At the 1921 election to Dáil Éireann, Maguire was returned unopposed as Teachta Dála (TD) for Mayo South–Roscommon South as a Sinn Féin candidate. He opposed the Anglo-Irish Treaty, and apart from saying "Níl" ("No" in English) when the vote was called, did not participate in any substantial way in the Dáil treaty debates. He was returned unopposed at the 1922 general election. At the 1923 general election, Maguire faced a contest and succeeded in securing the second of five seats in the Mayo South constituency, winning 5,712 votes (17.8%). He was a member of the anti-Treaty IRA executive which commanded rebel troops during the Irish Civil War. Maguire was captured by the National Army while in bed and was told that he would be executed, but his life was spared. While in prison his brother, Sean Maguire, aged 17, was executed by the government.

Maguire remained a TD until 1927. He had initially indicated a willingness to contest the June 1927 general election as a Sinn Féin candidate but withdrew after the IRA threatened to court-martial any member under IRA General Army Order 28, which forbade its members from standing in elections. (Despite this ban, IRA officers Seán Farrell (Leitrim–Sligo) and John Madden (Mayo North) contested the election, the latter successfully).

Maguire subsequently drifted out of the IRA and became vice-president of Sinn Féin from 1931 to 1933 during the presidency of Brian O'Higgins. In 1932, a Mayo IRA officer reported that Maguire, now firmly aligned with Sinn Féin, refused to call on men to join the IRA when speaking at republican commemorations. When challenged on this, Maguire claimed that, as the IRA "were no longer the same as they used to be", he disagreed with the organisation.

== Maguire and republican legitimacy ==
In December 1938, Maguire was one of a group of seven people, who had been elected to the Second Dáil in 1921, who met with the IRA Army Council under Seán Russell. At this meeting, the seven signed over what they contended was the authority of the Government of Dáil Éireann to the Army Council. Henceforth, the IRA Army Council perceived itself to be the legitimate government of the Irish Republic and, on this basis, the IRA and Sinn Féin justified their rejection of the states of the Republic of Ireland and Northern Ireland and political abstentionism from their parliamentary institutions. According to J. Bowyer Bell, in The Secret Army, "With the possible exception of Tom Maguire, who went along, the Dáil members felt that the IRA request gave them the moral recognition so long denied by all factions and that their conditional devolution of power would in turn give the IRA the moral basis for the impending campaign" of 1939–45.

When the majority of IRA and Sinn Féin decided to abandon abstentionism in the 1969–1970 split, Ruairí Ó Brádaigh and Dáithí Ó Conaill sought and secured Maguire's recognition of the Provisional IRA Council as the legitimate successor to the 1938 Army Council. Of the seven 1938 signatories, Maguire was the only one still alive. (Note: Other former members of the Second Dáil were still alive in 1969, but were disregarded by legitimists because they did not support the Irish Republic before 1938.) Maguire's support meant that the Provisional Army Council could claim to being the legitimate government of Ireland and the caretaker of true Irish Republicanism.

Likewise, in the aftermath of the 1986 split in the Republican Movement, both the Provisional IRA and the Continuity IRA sought Maguire's support. Maguire signed a statement which was issued posthumously in 1996. In it, he conferred legitimacy on the Army Council of the Continuity IRA (who provided a firing party at Maguire's funeral in 1993). In The Irish Troubles, J. Bowyer Bell describes Maguire's opinion in 1986, "abstentionism was a basic tenet of republicanism, a moral issue of principle. Abstentionism gave the movement legitimacy, the right to wage war, to speak for a Republic all but established in the hearts of the people."

== Death ==
He died on 5 July 1993. He is buried in Cross, County Mayo. Republican Sinn Féin have held multiple commemorations by his graveside.

== Writings ==
- Tom Maguire, The Mind of Wolfe Tone

== Footnotes ==
Dáil	Election	Deputy (Party)	Deputy (Party)	Deputy (Party)	Deputy (Party)
2nd	1921	Harry Boland (SF)	Tom Maguire (SF)	Daniel O'Rourke (SF)	William Sears (SF)
3rd	1922	Harry Boland (AT-SF)	Tom Maguire (AT-SF)	Daniel O'Rourke (PT-SF)	William Sears (PT-SF)
4th	1923	Constituency abolished. See Roscommon and Mayo South			

Dáil	Election	Deputy (Party)	Deputy (Party)	Deputy (Party)	Deputy (Party)	Deputy (Party)
4th	1923	Tom Maguire (Rep)	Michael Kilroy (Rep)	William Sears (CnaG)	Joseph MacBride (CnaG)	Martin Nally (CnaG)
5th	1927 (Jun)	Thomas J. O'Connell (Lab)	Michael Kilroy (FF)	Eugene Mullen (FF)	James FitzGerald-Kenney (CnaG)	Martin Nally (CnaG)
6th	1927 (Sep)	Thomas J. O'Connell (Lab)	Michael Kilroy (FF)	Richard Walsh (FF)	James FitzGerald-Kenney (CnaG)	Martin Nally (CnaG)
7th	1932	Edward Moane (FF)	Michael Kilroy (FF)	Richard Walsh (FF)	James FitzGerald-Kenney (CnaG)	Martin Nally (CnaG)
8th	1933	Edward Moane (FF)	Michael Kilroy (FF)	Richard Walsh (FF)	James FitzGerald-Kenney (CnaG)	Martin Nally (CnaG)
9th	1937	Edward Moane (FF)	Micheál Clery (FF)	Richard Walsh (FF)	James FitzGerald-Kenney (FG)	Martin Nally (FG)
10th	1938	Mícheál Ó Móráin (FF)	Micheál Clery (FF)	Richard Walsh (FF)	James FitzGerald-Kenney (FG)	Martin Nally (FG)
11th	1943	Mícheál Ó Móráin (FF)	Micheál Clery (FF)	Joseph Blowick (CnaT)	James FitzGerald-Kenney (FG)	Dominick Cafferky (CnaT)
12th	1944	Mícheál Ó Móráin (FF)	Micheál Clery (FF)	Joseph Blowick (CnaT)	Richard Walsh (FF)	Dominick Cafferky (CnaT)
12th	1945 by-election	Mícheál Ó Móráin (FF)	Bernard Commons (CnaT)	Joseph Blowick (CnaT)	Richard Walsh (FF)	Dominick Cafferky (CnaT)
13th	1948	Mícheál Ó Móráin (FF)	Bernard Commons (CnaT)	Joseph Blowick (CnaT)	Richard Walsh (FF)	4 seats 1948–1969
14th	1951	Mícheál Ó Móráin (FF)	Seán Flanagan (FF)	Joseph Blowick (CnaT)	Dominick Cafferky (CnaT)	4 seats 1948–1969
15th	1954	Mícheál Ó Móráin (FF)	Seán Flanagan (FF)	Joseph Blowick (CnaT)	Henry Kenny (FG)	4 seats 1948–1969
16th	1957	Mícheál Ó Móráin (FF)	Seán Flanagan (FF)	Joseph Blowick (CnaT)	Henry Kenny (FG)	4 seats 1948–1969
17th	1961	Mícheál Ó Móráin (FF)	Seán Flanagan (FF)	Joseph Blowick (CnaT)	Henry Kenny (FG)	4 seats 1948–1969
18th	1965	Mícheál Ó Móráin (FF)	Seán Flanagan (FF)	Michael Lyons (FG)	Henry Kenny (FG)	4 seats 1948–1969
19th	1969	Constituency abolished. See Mayo East and Mayo West				
