= Boland (surname) =

Boland is a surname. Notable people with the name include:

- Andrea Boland, American politician
- Boland (baseball), a 19th-century baseball player
- Boland brothers (early 20th century), Frank, James, and Joseph; early American aircraft designers
- Adam Boland (born 1977), Australian television personality
- Andrew Boland (born 1972), Irish slalom canoer
- Bernie Boland (1892–1973), American professional baseball player
- Bob Boland, Australian rugby league footballer and coach
- Bridget Boland (1913–1988), British playwright
- Charles W. Boland (1939–1961), Canadian jockey; killed in racing accident
- Derek Boland, better known as Derek B (1965–2009), British rap producer and artist
- Eamon Boland (born 1947), English actor
- Eavan Boland (1944–2020), Irish poet
- Eddie Boland (1883–1935), American film actor
- Edward Boland (1911–2001), American politician from Massachusetts; U.S. representative 1953–89
- Elizabeth Boland (born 1991), Canadian singer-songwriter who uses the performing name Lowell
- Ernest Bertrand Boland (1925–2023), American Roman Catholic bishop
- Francy Boland (1929–2005), Belgian jazz composer and pianist
- Frederick Boland (1904–1985), Irish government minister and ambassador; father of Eavan Boland
- Gerald Boland (1885–1973), Irish nationalist and politician; TD for Roscommon and government minister; brother of Harry Boland; father of Kevin Boland
- Halema Boland (born 1980), Kuwaiti television host
- Harold Boland (1891–1956), Australian trade unionist
- Harry Boland (1887–1922), Irish nationalist; brother of Gerald Boland
- Ike Boland (born c. 1908), American football player
- J. Kevin Boland (born 1935), Irish-American Roman Catholic prelate; Bishop of Savannah, Georgia
- James Boland (1856–1895) Irish Republican; father of Gerald and Harry Boland
- Jason Boland, lead guitar player of the American country music quintet Jason Boland & the Stragglers
- Jason Boland (bassist) (born 1987), bassist for Kodaline
- Jessica Boland, British materials scientist
- Joey Boland (born 1987), Irish hurler
- John Boland (disambiguation), several people
- Katie Boland (born 1988), Canadian actress
- Kevin Boland (1917–2001), Irish politician and government minister; son of Gerald Boland
- Mary Boland (1880–1965), American stage and film actress
- Mike Boland (disambiguation), several people
- Michael Boland (cinematographer), won 1992 Emmy Award
- Patrick Boland, Irish founder of Boland's Bakery
- Patrick J. Boland (1880–1942), American politician from Pennsylvania; U.S. representative 1931–42
- Paul Boland (contemporary), American comedian, impressionist, and singer
- Raymond James Boland (1932–2014), American Roman Catholic Bishop of Birmingham, Alabama
- Scott Boland (born 1989), Australian cricketer
- Thomas Aloysius Boland (1896–1979), American Roman Catholic prelate; Archbishop of Newark 1952–74
- Tom Boland (fl. 1909–1917), Scottish professional football player
- Veronica Grace Boland (1899–1982), American politician from Pennsylvania; U.S. representative 1942–43
- Warren Boland (born 1955), Australian radio personality and former professional rugby league footballer
- Willie Boland (born 1975), Irish professional football player
- William Boland Supply Chain professional in Aerospace Industry
- Murchadh Ua Beolláin, d. 1053

== See also ==
- Bolan (disambiguation)
- Bolen (surname)
- Bolland
- Borland (surname)
