= Boland =

Boland may refer to:

== Places ==
- Bolands or Bolans, a coastal village on Antigua
- Boland Lake, Nipissing District, Ontario, Canada
- Boland, Iran, in Fars Province, Iran
- Boland, County Tyrone, a townland in County Tyrone, Northern Ireland
- Boland, Western Cape, a region in South Africa

== Sports ==
- Boland Cavaliers, a South African rugby union team
- Boland (cricket team), a South African cricket team

== Other uses ==
- Boland (surname)
- Boland's Bakery, a defunct Irish baking company and owner of Boland's Mill
- Boland's Mill, a former flour mill and bakery in Dublin, Ireland

== See also ==
- Bowland (disambiguation)
- Bolan (disambiguation)
- Bolen (disambiguation)
- Bolland, a surname
- Borland (disambiguation)
