= Harry Boland (disambiguation) =

Harry Boland (1887–1922) was an Irish republican politician.

Harry Boland may also refer to:

- Harry Boland (trade unionist) (1891–1956), Australian shearer and trade unionist
- Harry Boland (basketball) (1925–2013), Irish businessman and basketball player
