= Capitol Offense =

Capitol Offense may refer to:

- Capitol Offense (band), an American rock band featuring the politician Mike Huckabee
- "Capitol Offense" (Murder, She Wrote), a 1985 television episode
- "Capitol Offense" (NCIS), a 2008 television episode
- "Capitol Offense!" (Teamo Supremo), a 2002 television episode
- Capitol Offense, a 2009 Ben Kincaid novel by William Bernhardt
- Capitol Offense, a 2012 novel by Cheryl Bolen
- Capitol Offense, a 2007 Nik Kane Alaska Mystery novel by Mike Doogan
- Capitol Offense, an annual 24 Hours of LeMons endurance racing event 2010–2012

== See also ==
- Capital punishment, punishment for a capital offense
