= Bolen =

Bolen may refer to:

- Bolen (surname)
- Boleń, Lesser Poland Voivodeship, village in Poland
- Boleń, Lubusz Voivodeship, village in Poland
- Boleń (bay), a bay in Poland
- Bolen, Georgia, a community in the United States
- Bolen Building, in Hindman, Kentucky, United States, listed on the National Register of Historic Places
- Roti bolen, an Indonesian bread
