= Bolland =

Bolland is a surname. Notable people with the surname include:

- Adrienne Bolland (1896–1975), French test pilot; first woman to fly over the Andes
- Brian Bolland (born 1951), British comics artist
- C. J. Bolland (born 1971), English electronic-music producer
- Charlotte Bolland, British art historian and curator
- David Bolland (born 1986), Canadian professional ice hockey player
- Gerardus Johannes Petrus Josephus Bolland (1854–1922), Dutch philosopher, scholar, and linguist
- Gordon Bolland (born 1943), English professional football player and manager
- Janice Bolland (born 1966), American cyclist
- Jasper Bolland (born 1986), Dutch professional football player
- Jean Bolland (1596–1665), Belgian Jesuit priest and hagiographer
- Kevin Bolland (born 1959), American race car driver
- Marc Bolland (born 1959), Dutch businessman, former CEO of Marks & Spencer
- Mark William Bolland (born 1966), Deputy Private Secretary to the Prince of Wales 1998–2002
- Martin Bolland (born 1956), British businessman
- Olav Bolland (born 1962), Norwegian academic engineer
- Paul Bolland (born 1979), English professional football player
- Phil Bolland (born 1967), English professional football player
- Brothers Rob and Ferdi Bolland (born 1955 and 1956), composers and music producers, who recorded as "Bolland" and "Bolland & Bolland"
- Tony Bolland (born 1967), English software entrepreneur and investor
- William Bolland (1772–1840), lawyer and bibliophile
- William Procter Bolland (1815–1863), cricketer

== See also ==
- Boland (disambiguation)
- Bollandist
