= Patrick Moylett =

Patrick Moylett (1878–1973) was a 20th-century Irish nationalist who, during the initial armistice negotiations to end the Anglo-Irish war, briefly served as president of the Irish Republican Brotherhood during late-1920. A successful businessman in County Mayo and County Galway, he was a close associate of Arthur Griffith and frequently travelled to London acting as a middleman between Sinn Féin and officials in the British government. He ran a business that was used as a front to import armaments for the cause and held that many of those that became closest associates of Éamon de Valera during the civil war rift had at one time worked for the British. Particularly that Erskine Childers despite his involvement with the Asgard and his close association with Éamon de Valera had been in the direct pay of the Admiralty Naval Intelligence Service up till 1916 before becoming secretary to the Éamon de Valera led treaty discussions.

== Biography ==
=== Early life and role during Irish War of Independence ===
Born in Crossmolina, County Mayo to a farming family, Moylett emigrated to London as a young man working in various departments in Harrods for five years before returning to Ireland in 1902. He opened a grocery and provisions business in Ballina and, as it proved successful, he later established branches in Galway and London between 1910 and 1914; the London-branch would be sold at the outbreak of the First World War. Having founded and organised the recruitment and funding of the Mayo activities of the IRA he also served as a justice of the Sinn Féin courts. He was advised to leave the area due to death threats from the Black and Tans and their burning down of his commercial premises in Ballina. On one occasion during that period, according to his military statements, he prevented some over-enthusiastic volunteers from attempting the kidnapping and assassination of Prince George Future King of England, sailing and holidaying in the Mayo/Donegal region at the time. Relocating to Dublin, the Irish overseas Trading Company was formed with a former director of ICI Chemicals & Explosives, he became involved in the Irish nationalist movement and was active in the Mayo and Galway areas during the Irish War of Independence. The Irish Overseas Trading Company, of which Moylett was one of two directors; acted as a front for the importation of armaments covered by consignments of trade goods. According to his subsequent detailed military statements archived in the bureau of military history by the Irish Army, the consignments were imported to a number of warehouses in the Dublin Docks with the three keyholders to the warehouses being Éamon de Valera, Michael Collins and Arthur Griffith.

With Harry Boland in the United States with Éamon de Valera, Moylett succeeded him as president of the Irish Republican Brotherhood and, in October 1920, he was selected to go to London as the personal envoy of Arthur Griffith. During the next several months, Moylett was involved in secret discussions with British government officials on the recognition of Dáil Éireann, a general amnesty for members of the Irish Republican Army and the organisation of a peace conference to end hostilities between both parties.

He was assisted by John Steele, the London editor of the Chicago Tribune, who helped him contact high-level members of the British Foreign Office. One of these officials, in particular C.J. Phillps, had frequent meetings with him. Discussions centered on the possibility of an armistice and amnesty in Ireland with the hope for a settlement in which a national Parliament would be established with safeguards for Unionists of Ulster. These meetings were later attended by H. A. L. Fisher, the Minister of Education and one of the most outspoken opponents of unauthorised reprisals against the Irish civilian population by the British government. One of the main points Fisher expressed to Moylett was the necessity of Sinn Féin to compromise on its demands for a free and united republic. His efforts were hindered however, both to the slow and confused pace of the peace negotiations as well as the regularly occurring violence in Ireland, most especially the Bloody Sunday incident on 21 November 1920, which happened whilst he was in London speaking with members of the cabinet.

=== Later life ===
During the Irish Civil War, although a supporter of the Anglo-Irish Treaty, he chose not to participate in the Free State government party. He did not play any major political or diplomatic role after the early 1920s, but was sporadically involved in political parties. In 1926 he a founding member of the Clann Éireann Party and became an early advocate of the withholding of land annuities. Between July and October 1940, he was a member of the People's National Party (Ireland)People's National Party]].

Moylett lived with his family in Dublin from the early 1920s onwards. He died in 1973, and was buried alongside his wife Minnie in Dean's Grange Cemetery.

Political offices
Preceded by Harry Boland	President of the Irish Republican Brotherhood; 1920	Succeeded by Michael Collins
