= Harry Boland (basketball) =

Irish businessman and basketball player (1925–2013)

Personal information
- Born: Henry Boland; 21 September 1925 Dublin, Ireland
- Died: 18 December 2013 (aged 88) Dublin, Ireland
- Spouse: Noirin Tracey
- Children: 3
- Parent: Gerald Boland (father)
- Relatives: Harry Boland (uncle); Kevin Boland (brother)

Sport
- Sport: Basketball

Harry Boland (21 September 1925 – 18 December 2013) was an Irish businessman, and a basketball player who competed in the 1948 Summer Olympics in London.

== Biography ==
Henry Boland was born in Marino, Dublin, Ireland in 1925. He was named in honor of his uncle, Harry Boland, a prominent activist and politician during the Irish revolutionary period. His father, Gerald Boland, and his brother Kevin Boland held significant roles within Fianna Fáil and served as senior ministers in the Irish government.

Boland was a close friend of Charles Haughey. They knew each other from childhood, having both attended St. Joseph's C.B.S. in Fairview. In 1946, he graduated from University College Dublin with a Bachelor of Commerce degree. In 1950, he and Haughey set up the accountancy firm Haughey, Boland & Co. Haughey later left to pursue his political career.

== Death ==
He was to married to Noirin Tracey, and they had three children. Harry Boland died on 18 December 2013, aged 88, in Dublin. He was buried at St. Fintan's Cemetery in Sutton, Dublin.
