= John Kelly (journalist) =

Irish journalist and author (1943–2022)

- Born: 28 October 1943; Dublin, Ireland
- Died: 11 August 2022 (aged 78); Dublin, Ireland
- Resting place: Mount Jerome Cemetery
- Known for: Journalist and author
- Spouse: Mary McBride (m. 1970)
- Children: 5

John Robert Kelly (28 October 1943 – 11 August 2022) was an Irish journalist and author.

== Career ==
Born in Dublin on 28 October 1943, Kelly's newspaper career began at the Carlow Nationalist. As a young man, he worked in newspapers in New York City. Kelly subsequently worked as a journalist with the Irish Press Group of newspapers. He was an activist with the National Union of Journalists, led the union chapter at the Irish Press Group, chaired the union's Dublin newspapers branch and served for a brief period on the union’s National Executive Council. Following the closure of the Irish Press Group of newspapers, Kelly worked as a freelance journalist with the Irish Examiner and the Irish Echo. He also co-wrote a biography of Harry Boland alongside Andrew Brasier.

== Death ==
Kelly died at Beaumont Hospital in Dublin on 11 August 2022, at the age of 78. He was survived by his wife and five children.
