= Pat Nally =

Irish republican, inspired GAA foundation

Patrick William Nally (13 March 1857^{A} – 8 November 1891) was a member of the Supreme Council of the Irish Republican Brotherhood and well known Connacht athlete from Balla, County Mayo. A prolific sportsman, Nally organised some of the sports events in Ireland open to the working class instead of the ruling elite, and in turn, he was highly influential on Michael Cusack, who would go on to found the Gaelic Athletic Association. Highly active in the Land League and the IRB in Connacht, In 1881 Nally was sentenced to ten years imprisonment in Mountjoy Jail, Dublin, for what became known as the "Crossmolina Conspiracy", in which he and others were accused of plotting to kill a landlord's agents. While imprisoned Nally was reportedly subjected to harsh treatment and he later died in prison in November 1891 under dubious circumstances. Nally was later honoured by the GAA for his influence on their creation.

== Biography ==
=== Background ===
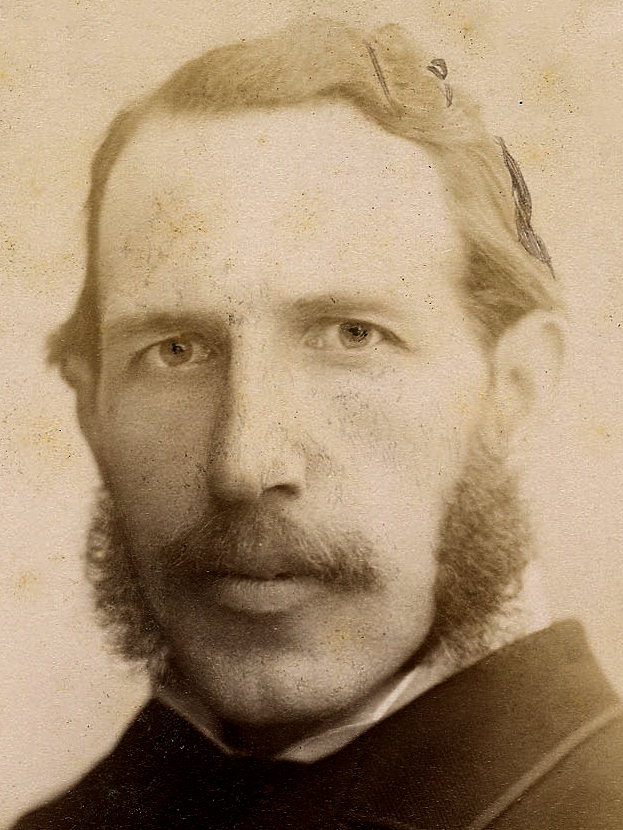
Nally was given an opportunity early in life to work for the Fenian cause when he became involved in John O'Connor Power's election to parliament in 1874

Nally was the eldest son of eight children and one of six brothers, of a prosperous farmer William Nally. William Nally had been an agent for the local landlords the Lynch Blosse family, who owned extensive lands in Balla and Claremorris. The Lynch Blosse family also owned Rockstown house, which subsequently became the property of the Nally Family. Despite the fact that his work as a landlord's agent would have pitted him against the local tenants, it is believed that Willian Nally was a Fenian supporter. Patrick Nally from an early age himself became a Fenian, and by the late 1870s was a leading organiser of the Irish Republican Brotherhood.

Nally was educated at St Jarlath's College in Tuam, County Galway, where he made important connections with other Irish nationalists. In 1874 Nally worked with other Fenians in the election campaign of John O'Connor Power during the 1874 County Mayo by-election. O'Connor Power was a member of the Supreme Council of the IRB who had just spent time studying at St Jarlath's himself. Despite opposition from the Catholic clergy, O'Connor Power was able to win one of the two seats on offer by a slim majority.

=== Sports ===
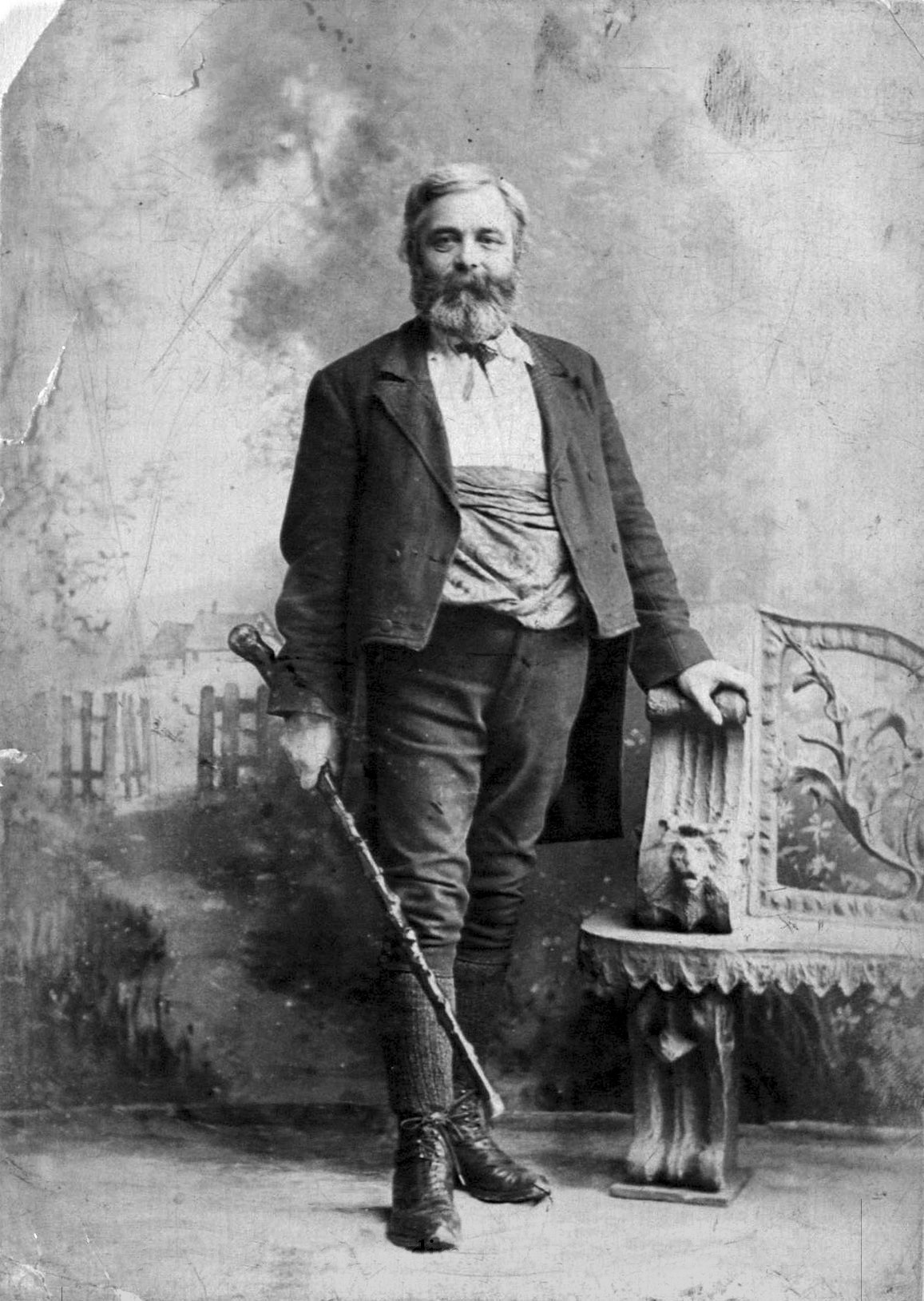
Nally met Michael Cusack through his sports organisation, and was highly influential on Cusack's ideas

In addition to his political activities, Nally was noted for his passion for sports. On 11 September 1879 Nally organised a mass sports event at his father's farm in Mayo that was open to all members of the public, as opposed to the norms of the time in which only members of the upper classes were expected to engage in sports. Charles Stewart Parnell sponsored Nally's event and it proved to be quite successful and became annual. Through his sports events, Nally befriended Michael Cusack and Maurice Davin. Cusack's was quite enamoured with Nally's event and organised one himself in Dublin the following April. Cusack would later recall both Nally and himself were once walking through the Phoenix Park in Dublin seeing only a handful of people playing sports in the park and it so depressed them that they agreed it was time to "make an effort to preserve the physical strength of our race." Cusack found that Nally's views on the influence of British landlordism on Irish athletics were the same as his.

Following the success of his first event, Nally organised another meeting on 14 October 1880, and Nally ensured that the organising committee contained no landlords.

=== Politics ===
In February and April 1879, Nally led over 1,000 marchers from Claremorris to the first Land League meeting in Irishtown, Co Mayo. Later Nally organised and led marchers against the eviction of the Dempsey family of Balla, Co Mayo. Nally was present at the founding meeting in August 1879 of the Land League of Mayo, later becoming the Land League. Nally was elected a joint secretary. Michael Davitt credited Nally as having a huge influence on the success of the Irishtown meeting which became the foundation of the Land League.

By 1880, Nally had become a member of the IRB's Supreme Council, and replaced Matthew Harris as the leader of the IRB in Connacht by autumn of 1880. When speaking on Land League platforms, Nally did not make grand statements about reorganising society, but instead focused on a more legalistic argument that tenants should pay no more than the rents specified in Griffith's Valuation of 1854. However, touching on the Land League's more nationalistic tendencies, Nally expressed the hope that the Royal Irish Constabulary, many of whom were the sons of farmers, would join the land league and turn against the British administration.

During the winter of 1880, Nally relocated to Manchester, where he spent his time attempting to secure the shipping of 300 rifles to Mayo. While still in Manchester he wrote back to the press in Mayo to condemn agrarian riots taking place in his absence. In September 1881 Nally came out in support of Gladstone's Land Law (Ireland) Act 1881.

In 1882 Nally became a poor law guardian in Castlebar and was granted a gun license by the RIC. The local RIC did not suspect Nally of being a subversive due to his public politics being seemingly moderate and his middle-class family background. However, the newly formed Special Crime Branch in Manchester was aware of his IRB membership and moved in on Nally. On 15 May 1883, Nally and six others were charged with being the leaders of a secret society of assassins who were planning to kill agents of a landlord in Crossmolina, County Mayo. Nally and the rest were due to stand trial in Castlebar on 1 June, but due to mass protests calling him an innocent man, the trial was moved to Cork city for December. In the meantime, the RIC were ordered to search Nally's home, and subsequently, the British press reported that two rifles, a revolver, and explosives were found.

On 28 March 1884, following eleven months in police custody and a four-month trial, Nally was convicted and sentenced to ten years imprisonment while the other prisoners each received seven-year sentences. Nally's imprisonment meant he could not attend the first meeting of the Gaelic Athletic Association on 1 October 1884, an organisation many felt he had directly inspired.

In protest against his imprisonment, the Land League moved to nominate Nally for parliament during the 1885 United Kingdom general election. However, Nally's name was replaced just days before the election was due to take place owing to the objection of C. S. Parnell, who pushed for J. F. X. O'Brien (himself a member of the IRB) instead.

=== Death ===
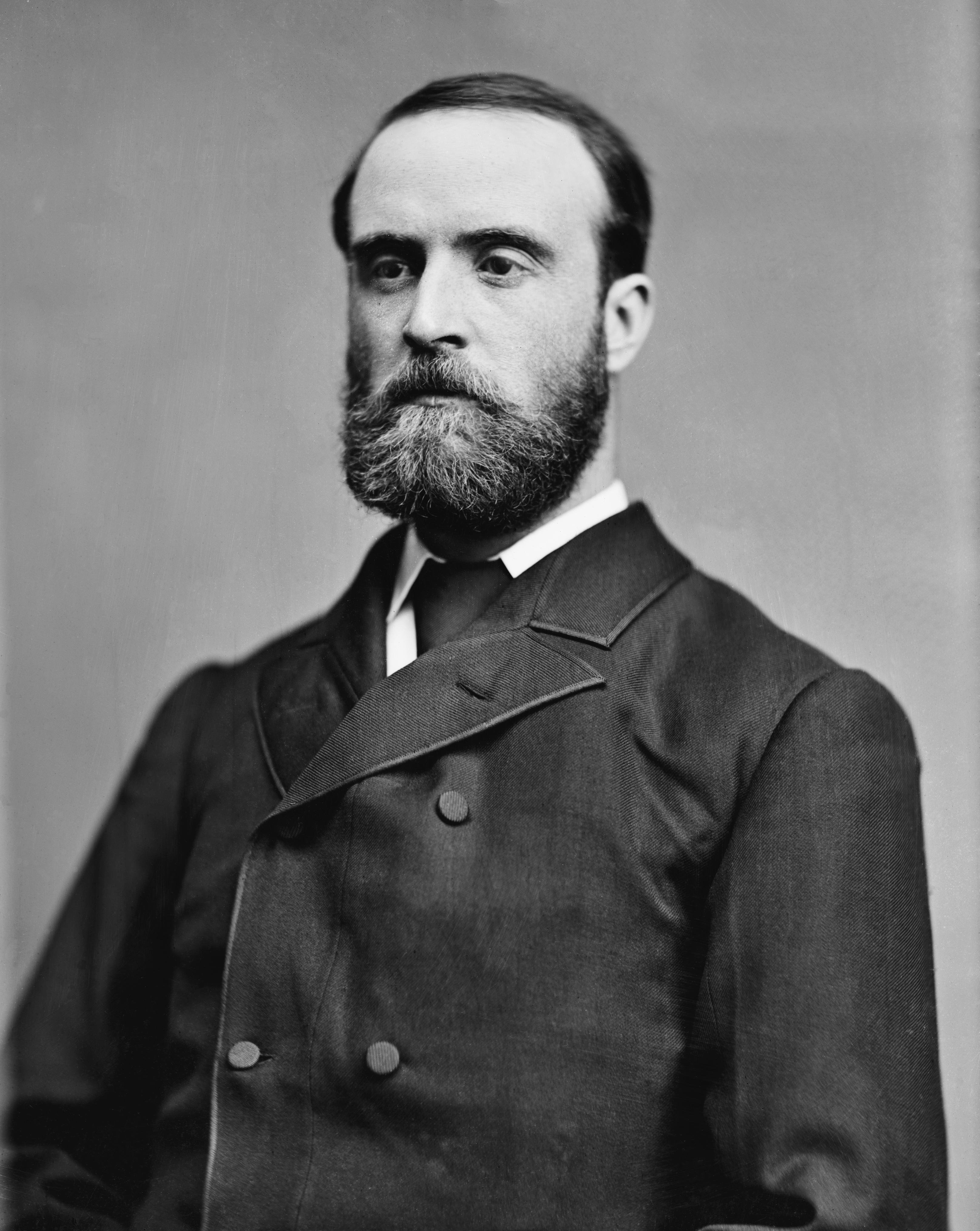
CS Parnell had been an early supporter of Nally and Nally refused to turn on Parnell during the Parnell Commission. Dying only a month apart, their coffins would be draped by the same green flag.

During the Parnell Commission that took place between 1888 and 1890, the authorities at Dublin Castle secretly offered Nally his release if he would agree to give evidence against Parnell. Nally refused. Publicly, it was announced in October 1891 that Nally would be granted early release from prison in November on account of good behaviour, and his supporters began organising a welcoming committee for him. However, despite reports that he was in good health, Nally died in Mountjoy Prison on 9 November 1891, with the reason given being as a result of typhoid fever. Neither Nally's family nor the public was convinced by this declaration and an inquest was held into his death. The Dublin city coroner concluded that he had become susceptible to the disease because of the excessive labour and punishment inflicted on him for refusing to cooperate with the commission.

His funeral was organised by James Boland, with whom he had conspired in Manchester, and saw a large turnout, including eleven members of parliament as well the leaders of the GAA and IRB. Nally's coffin was draped with the same green flag that had adorned Parnell's coffin just one month prior. Nally was buried in the Fenian section of Glasnevin cemetery.

== Legacy ==
Throughout his life, Michael Cusack held Nally in great reverence and repeatedly made it clear that nobody had done more to persuade him to found the Gaelic Athletic Association in 1884. Nally G.A.A. Club in Dublin was named in his honour and would be closely associated with working-class nationalists and republicans during the 1890s and beyond.

In Nally's memory, a Celtic cross was erected in the centre of Balla in 1900, and some years later a monument was erected in Crossmolina in memory of all seven men convicted during the Cork trials of March 1884.

In 1952 the GAA erected a terrace stand at the north end of Croke Park named "Nally Stand" in his honour. It was unique for being the only stand in the stadium named after a person who had no direct connection to the Gaelic Athletic Association. In January 2003, it was removed from Croke Park as part of the redevelopment of the stadium. The stand was relocated to the grounds of Carrickmore GAA club in County Tyrone while a new Nally terrace was erected at Croke Park.

== Footnotes ==
A. Some sources cite 1856 or 1857 as the year of birth
