= Kitty Kiernan =

Fiancée of Michael Collins (1892–1945)

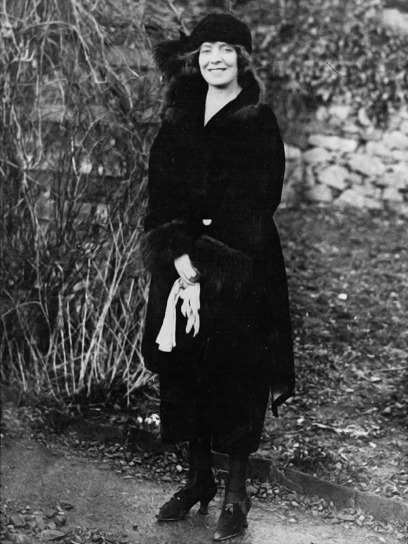
Kitty Kiernan

Catherine Brigid Cronin (née Kiernan; 26 January 1893 – 25 July 1945) was an Irish woman widely known as the fiancée of Irish revolutionary leader and Chairman of the Provisional Government, Michael Collins.

== Early life ==
Catherine Bridget "Kitty" Kiernan was born on 26 January 1892 in Granard, County Longford to Peter Kiernan and Bridget née Dawson. She was educated at Loreto Convent, County Wicklow. Hers was a very comfortably-off merchant family with five sisters and one brother. Her parents enjoyed a happy marriage, and life in the Kiernan home was joyous until Kitty reached her teens. On 27 November 1907, her sister, Elizabeth Mary (a twin), died aged eighteen of pulmonary tuberculosis, while Elizabeth's twin sister, Rose, would seem to have died the same year in Davos, Switzerland; which is consistent with tuberculosis as a cause of death. Her mother Bridget died on 29 November 1908, of apoplexy, while her father, Peter, died almost exactly a year later, on 9 November 1909, of pneumonia. The Kiernan family owned the Greville Arms Hotel in the town, as well as a grocery shop, a hardware store, a timber and undertaking business and also a bar. Around the corner from the hotel they operated a bakery which supplied the town and most of the surrounding countryside. All the family worked in one capacity or another.

== Relationship with Michael Collins ==
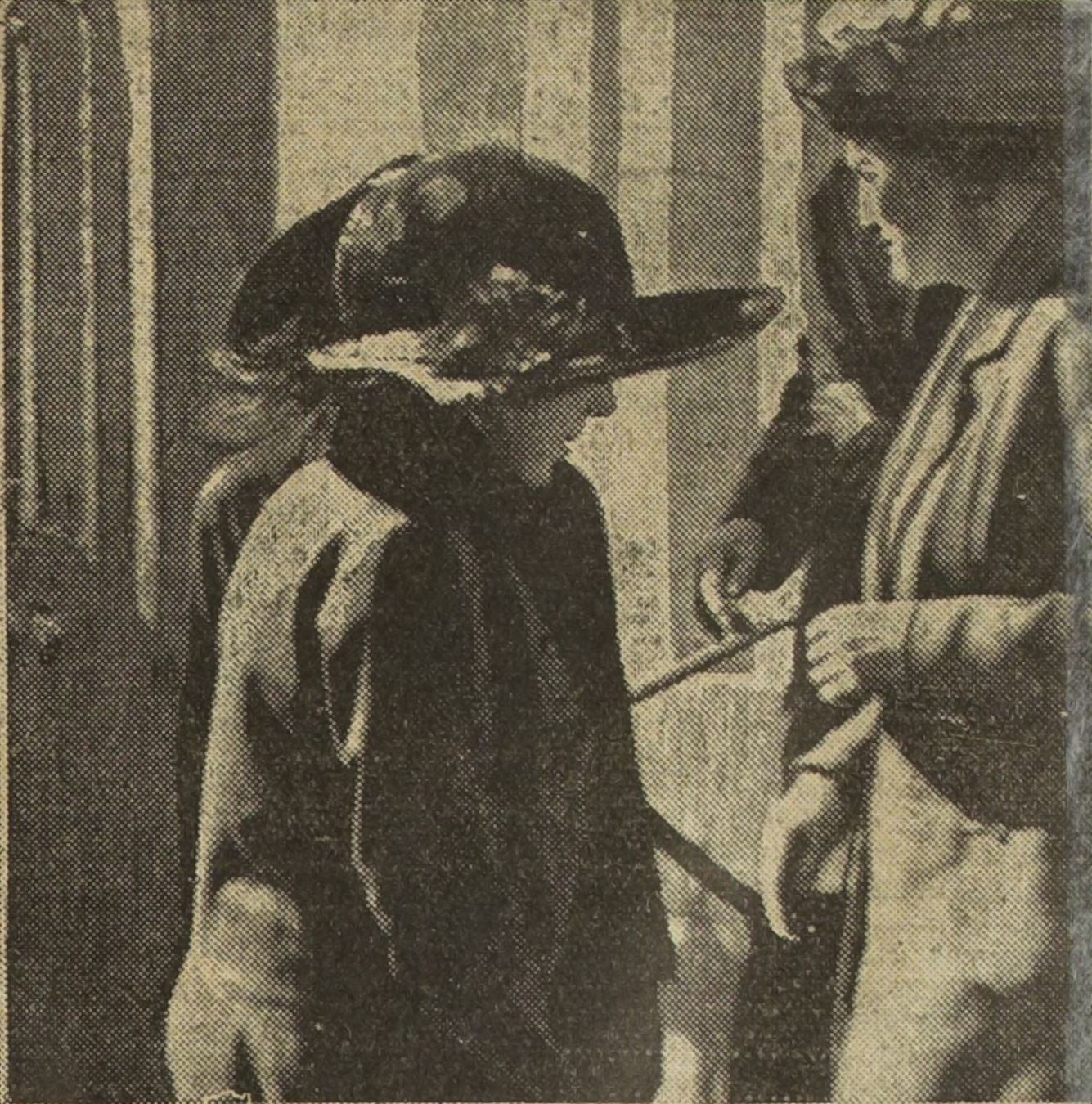
Kitty Kiernan at Collins' funeral

Michael Collins, one of the principal founders of the independent Irish state, was introduced to the vivacious Kiernan sisters by his cousin Gearóid O'Sullivan, who was already dating Maud Kiernan. Collins initially fell for the captivating Helen Kiernan, but she was already engaged to someone else. He then turned his interests to Kitty, who had already captured the interest of Collins' friend Harry Boland. However, it was Collins to whom Kitty became engaged, with plans to marry Collins in a November 1922 double ceremony to include the nuptials of Maud and Gearóid. Collins' assassination four months earlier resulted in a single wedding taking place.

== Later life and death ==
On 10 June 1925, Kitty married Felix Cronin, who was Quartermaster General in the Irish Army. They had two children, their first born son, Felix Junior (d. 21 November 1999), and their second son, Michael Collins Cronin (b. 20 December 1929, d. 5 January 2021).

Kitty died, aged 54, of a cerebral hemorrhage on 24 July 1945, and her grave is close to that of Collins. Felix Cronin died suddenly on 22 October 1961 while playing golf at Woodbrook Golf Club and is also buried in Glasnevin. Felix Junior and his son Rex (d. 25 November 1986, aged 23) are interred with his parents Kitty and Felix in Glasnevin Cemetery. As of 27 April 2024, Michael Collins Cronin is also interred at the family's plot in Glasnevin.

== Bright's disease ==
Several sources, for example, a 1996 piece from the Irish Times entitled "Life after Mick", state that Kitty Kiernan plus several of her siblings died of Bright's disease; what one would class today as chronic nephritis. Her sisters Maud (2 October 1895–28 October 1940) who married Gearóid O'Sullivan on 18 October 1922 and Helena Josephine (22 September 1894–28 May 1940) who married solicitor Paul McGovern on 5 October 1921 both have chronic nephritis registered as their cause of death. While the cause of death for Kitty is registered as a cerebral hemorrhage, the suggestion is that she suffered from ill-health for several years before her death.

== Family ==
Her only brother, Laurence Dawson Kiernan (22 Jan 1892–22 December 1948), of the Greville Arms Hotel, died of cirrhosis of the liver.

Her twin sisters, Lizzie and Rose, both died in 1907 of tuberculosis.

Her sister, Christina Margaret (b. 9 December 1890), married Thomas Magee on 22 June 1921 in Dublin. Kitty was a witness. Christina died on 3 February 1953 in Castlebar.

== Correspondence ==
Kitty Kiernan and Michael Collins kept up a lengthy correspondence and while Collins was in London during the Treaty negotiations, he wrote to her every day. These letters are the subject of a book written by Leon O'Broin entitled "In Great Haste". Kitty's worst fears were realized when Collins was killed in action at the age of 31 near Béal na Bláth, County Cork, on 22 August 1922.

In 2000, some of the 300 letters sent by Kiernan and Collins to each other went on permanent display at the Cork Public Museum. These letters give a great insight into Kitty's attitude to life and into the political events of this time.

Former Fine Gael minister Peter Barry donated his collection of historic letters to the Lord Mayor of Cork, on behalf of the municipal museum. The collection, purchased from the Cronin family in 1995, was conserved at the Delmas bindery at Marsh's Library in Dublin: the letters were also catalogued and then returned to the Cork Public Museum. The Peter Barry collection contains letters from Harry Boland, a friend of Collins and former suitor of Kitty Kiernan.

There are also a number of letters to Collins from various individuals and to Kiernan from others. The bulk of the letters between Collins and Kiernan were written between 1919 and 1922, and through their almost daily contact emerges a picture of the dreams and aspirations of the man often called Ireland's "lost leader" and the woman with whom he wanted to share a "normal" life.

"Their correspondence represents a unique and revealing portrait of a remarkable man and an ordinary woman made extraordinary by tragic circumstances", said a museum spokesperson.

== In popular culture ==
In the 1996 film Michael Collins Kitty Kiernan was played by American actress Julia Roberts though some reviewers were critical of the character's development.

A number of pubs are named in memory of Kitty Kiernan, such as one in Donnycarney, Dublin, Waterford, in the Bay Ridge section of Brooklyn and New York, US. A similar pub in Linz, Austria was closed in 2009.
