= Bowland =

Bowland at its most general most often refers to:

- Forest of Bowland, an area of barren gritstone fells, deep valleys and peat moorland, mostly in north-east Lancashire, England, with a small part in Yorkshire
- Trough of Bowland, a valley and high pass in the Forest of Bowland

Bowland may also refer to places and things most of which are named after or associated with the Forest and Trough of Bowland:

- Bowland Bridge, a village in Cumbria, England.
- Bowland College, part of Lancaster University.
- Bowland Forest High, a civil parish in the Ribble Valley district of Lancashire, England
- Bowland Forest Low, a civil parish in the Ribble Valley district of Lancashire, England
- Bowland High, a coeducational secondary school with academy status, located in Grindleton, Lancashire, England
- Bowland High Group, a thick succession of limestone rock strata in the Craven Basin of Lancashire and Yorkshire
- Bowland railway station, a former station near Bowland, Galashiels, Scotland
- Bowland Rural District, an administrative area in the West Riding of Yorkshire 1894-1974
- Bowland Shale Formation, a Carboniferous geological formation
- Bowland-with-Leagram, a civil parish in the Ribble Valley district of Lancashire, England
- Lordship of Bowland, an historic feudal barony
- Newton-in-Bowland, a village in Lancashire, England, formerly known as Newton-on-Hodder
