= Tom Boland =

Scottish footballer

Personal information
- Full name: Thomas Boland
- Place of birth: Scotland
- Position: Half back

Senior career*
| Years | Team | Apps | (Gls) |
| 1909–1917 | Dundee Hibernian | 73 | (1) |
- * Club domestic league appearances and goals

Thomas Boland was a Scottish professional footballer who played as a half back. Boland was playing for St Joseph's, a Dundee Junior side when he became Dundee Hibernian's first-ever signing on 28 May 1909, four days after the club had been formed. He made his debut on 18 August 1909 in the club's first competitive match, a friendly with Edinburgh club Hibernian. Boland played his last game exactly eight years after his début and stayed with the club for a short spell as a trainer.
