= Bolen (surname) =

Bolen is a surname. Notable people with the surname include:

- Bob Bolen (1926–2014), American politician and businessman
- Brad Bolen (born 1989), American judoka
- Brock Bolen (born 1985), American football player
- Cheryl Bolen, American writer, educator and journalist
- Dave Bolen (1923–2022), American sprinter, businessman, and diplomat
- Jean Shinoda Bolen (born 1936), American psychiatrist and writer
- Lin Bolen (1941–2018), American television executive and producer
- Marcie Bolen (born 1977), American guitarist
- Skip Bolen, American photographer
- Stew Bolen (1902–1969), American baseball player

Fictional characters:

- Angie Bolen, character in the television series Desperate Housewives
