= Gerald Boland =

Irish politician (1885–1973)

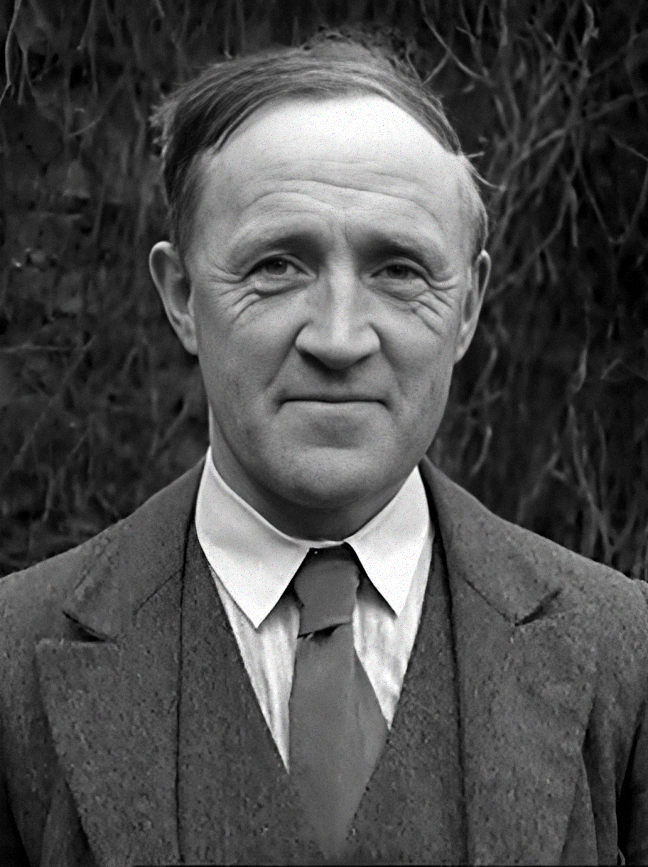
- Boland in 1933

Minister for Justice
- In office 13 June 1951 – 2 June 1954
- Taoiseach: Éamon de Valera
- Preceded by: Daniel Morrissey
- Succeeded by: James Everett
- In office 8 September 1939 – 18 February 1948
- Taoiseach: Éamon de Valera
- Preceded by: P. J. Ruttledge
- Succeeded by: Seán Mac Eoin

Minister for Lands
- In office 11 November 1936 – 8 September 1939
- Taoiseach: Éamon de Valera
- Preceded by: Frank Aiken
- Succeeded by: Thomas Derrig

Minister for Posts and Telegraphs
- In office 8 February 1933 – 11 November 1936
- President: Éamon de Valera
- Preceded by: Joseph Connolly
- Succeeded by: Oscar Traynor

Parliamentary Secretary
- 1932–1933: Government Chief Whip

Senator
- In office 23 June 1965 – 5 November 1969
- Constituency: Nominated by the Taoiseach
- In office 14 December 1961 – 23 June 1965
- Constituency: Industrial and Commercial Panel

Teachta Dála
- In office August 1923 – October 1961
- Constituency: Roscommon

Personal details
- Born: 25 May 1885 Manchester, England
- Died: 5 January 1973 (aged 87) Dublin, Ireland
- Resting place: Glasnevin Cemetery, Dublin
- Party: Fianna Fáil (1926–1973); Sinn Féin (1923–1926)
- Spouse: Annie Keating (m. 1920; died 1970)
- Children: 7, including Kevin and Harry
- Parent: James Boland (father)
- Relatives: Harry Boland (brother)
- Education: O'Brien Institute

Military service
- Allegiance: Irish Republican Brotherhood; Irish Volunteers
- Years of service: 1913–1922
- Battles/wars: Easter Rising; Irish War of Independence

Gerald Boland (25 May 1885 – 5 January 1973) was an Irish Fianna Fáil politician who served as Minister for Justice from 1939 to 1948 and 1951 to 1954, Minister for Lands from 1936 to 1939, Minister for Posts and Telegraphs from 1933 to 1936 and Government Chief Whip from 1932 to 1933. He served as a Senator from 1961 to 1969 and a Teachta Dála (TD) for the Roscommon constituency from 1923 to 1961.

Boland was active during the Irish revolutionary period, fighting in both the Irish War of Independence and the Irish Civil War, the latter of which saw the death of his brother Harry Boland. Following the wars, Boland was among those who led Republicans out of Sinn Féin and into Fianna Fáil following a split over abstentionism. When Fianna Fáil came to power in 1932, Boland became a perennial member of the cabinet, most notably as Ireland's longest-serving Minister for Justice. Despite being socially liberal in his views and a committed Irish republican, as Minister for Justice he was frequently asked by the government to enforce hardline policies against Irish citizens to prevent the Irish Republican Army from drawing the Irish state into World War II.

== Early life ==
Born in Manchester, Gerald Boland was the son of James Boland and Kate Boland (née Woods). He was the second child and eldest son among three sons (including Harry Boland) and two daughters of the couple. His family on both sides were staunch Irish Nationalists; his father had been a Fenian in his younger days, a devout follower of Charles Stewart Parnell, and later a member of the Irish Republican Brotherhood (IRB). His father also had ties to the Irish National Invincibles, and his association with them caused him to have to flee to New York City for a time.

After his national school education Boland attended the O'Brien Institute in Fairview, Dublin. He left school at fifteen and became an apprentice fitter at Broadstone Station. Instead of attending his studies to secure an engineering diploma, Boland took Irish language and history classes at night. Despite this, he passed his engineering exams.

== Revolutionary years ==
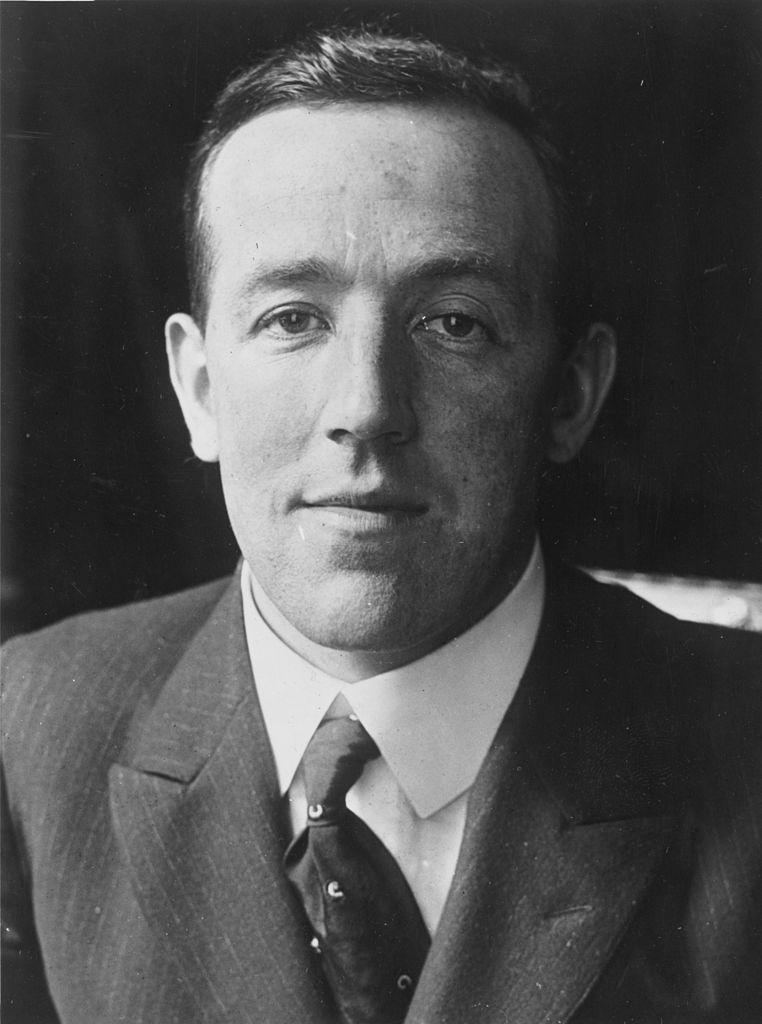
Gerald's brother Harry Boland was killed during the Irish Civil War while Gerald was imprisoned

Boland was enrolled in the IRB along with his younger brothers Harry in 1904, following in the footsteps of his father James, uncle Jack. Gerald and his brothers Harry and Ned subsequently joined the Irish Volunteers when that organisation was established in 1913, serving in the same company as Arthur Griffith. When news broke out of the Easter Rising in 1916 Boland immediately left his job in Crooksling, however, he was bitterly disappointed when he found out that the order was countermanded. When the rebellion began in earnest on Easter Monday, he made his way to Jacob's Mill where he fought under Thomas MacDonagh. Following the official surrender, Boland was arrested and interned at Frongoch internment camp in Wales, where he came into contact with other notable revolutionary leaders, including his brother Harry's friend Michael Collins.

Boland was released after a general amnesty in December 1916, however, he remained involved in revolutionary circles, although he declined to rejoin the IRB, believing the organisation was no longer needed. He was arrested and imprisoned in Belfast from May to December 1918 for practising military drills in the Dublin Mountains. Meanwhile, a number of his colleagues secured their release by winning seats in the 1918 general election.

During the War of Independence, Boland was Battalion Commandant of 7 Battalion, Dublin Brigade, Irish Republican Army (IRA) and was known as "Trotsky" for his left-wing views.

He and his brothers were opposed to the Anglo-Irish Treaty of 1921. Boland was Battalion Commandant of 3 Battalion, 2 Dublin Brigade (South Dublin) in Blessington, County Wicklow, but was captured early on in Irish Civil War on 7 July 1922 and was interned until release in July 1924. On the outside, his brother Harry died some days after being shot, in August 1922, after two National Army officers attempted to arrest him at the Grand Hotel in Skerries, County Dublin. Boland was later awarded a pension by the Irish government under the Military Service Pensions Act, 1934 for his service with the Irish Volunteers and the IRA between 1916 and 1923.

== Political career ==
=== Beginnings ===
Following the end of the Civil War, Boland helped to build up Sinn Féin as the main Republican party. While still imprisoned, he was selected to stand for Dáil Éireann as the TD for Roscommon, Harry's old seat, for the 1923 general election, in which he was successful. Boland was amongst those in Kilmainham Gaol who went on hunger strike in October 1923. The hunger strike did not result in his release and Boland credits his practice of Yoga with keeping him alive at that time.

Boland was eventually released from the custody of the state in July 1924. Upon his release, Boland became secretary of Sinn Féin and stood on the executive of the party.

=== Sinn Féin to Fianna Fáil ===
Boland was amongst the first in Sinn Féin to call for an end to the party's abstentionism from Dáil Éireann, believing it to be a political dead end. Party leader Éamon de Valera proposed that the party abandon this policy and take their seats in the Dáil if changes were made to the oath of allegiance to the British monarch. His proposal was defeated and de Valera and his supporters, including Boland, left Sinn Féin. Shortly after this split, a new party emerged called Fianna Fáil, with de Valera acting as leader and the other disillusioned Republican TDs joining. Boland was vital in transferring many members from Sinn Féin to Fianna Fáil. Fianna Fáil briefly also had an abstentionist policy but in 1927 a new law forced Fianna Fáil TDs to take the oath of allegiance and take their seats in the Dáil. Fianna Fáil dismissed the Oath as "an empty formula".

Boland worked alongside Seán Lemass in building up Fianna Fáil's grassroots support and organisation, with Boland giving particular attention to the party's rural apparatus. In the September 1927 general election Fianna Fáil came within four seats of the ruling Cumann na nGaedheal party. The latter formed a coalition of sorts with the Farmers' Party and returned to government.

=== In cabinet ===
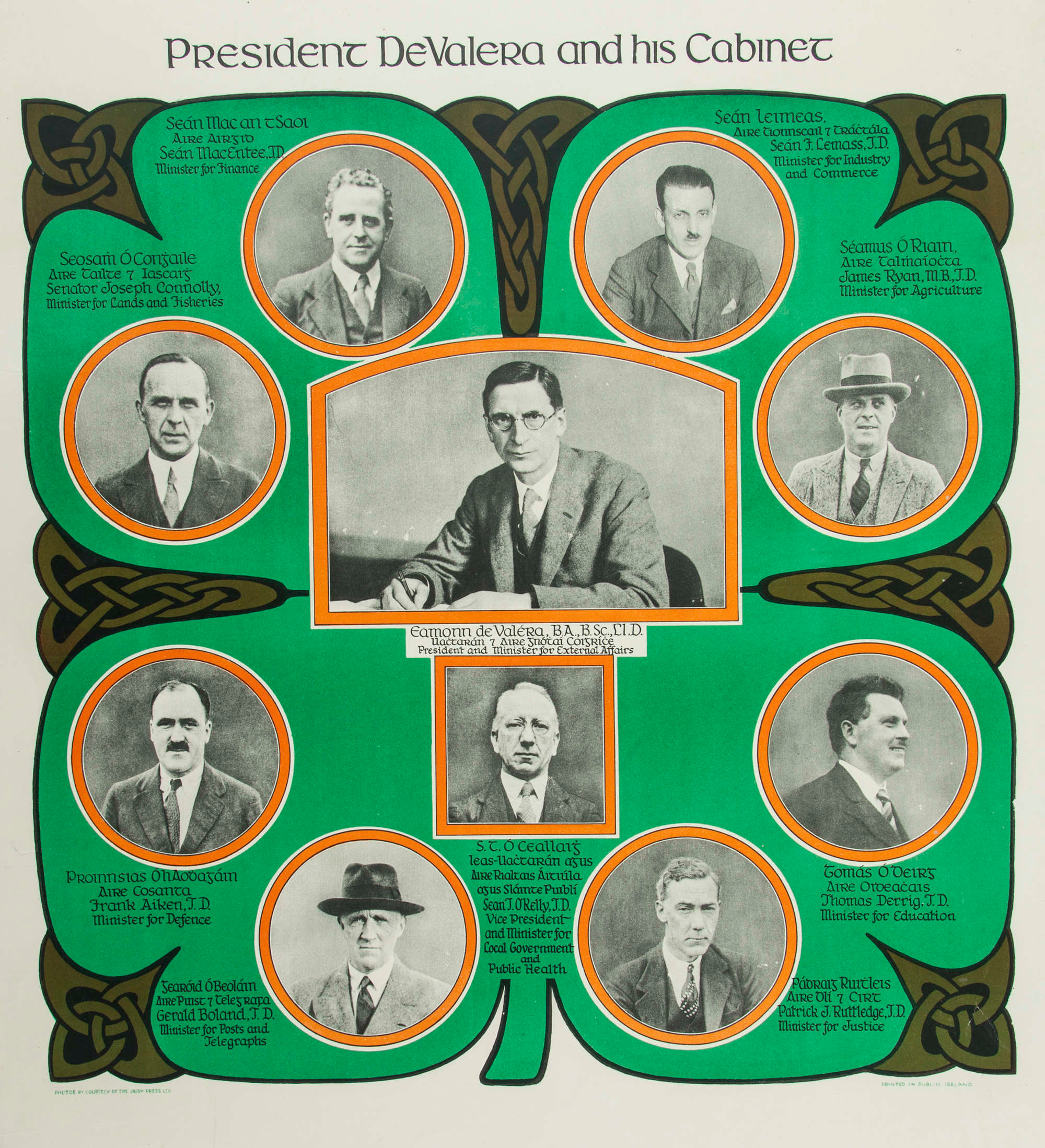
Boland as part of Fianna Fáil's first ever cabinet

Following the 1932 general election, Fianna Fáil formed a new government. Boland was appointed Government Chief Whip, a position which allowed him to attend cabinet meetings but not vote at them.

Fianna Fáil remained in power with an increased mandate following the 1933 general election and Boland was promoted to the position of Minister for Posts and Telegraphs. Despite being the Minister in charge of the postal service, Boland did not own a telephone until some time later. During his tenure, the postal service made considerable progress. It was also during this time that the Post Office became a paying concern. During his time as minister, Boland oversaw a major expansion of the telephone service in Ireland, improvements in the transmission capacity of Radio Éireann, and construction of new provincial post offices and a new central postal sorting office.

Boland was acting minister of Justice briefly for a time when P. J. Ruttledge was ill. It was during this time that Boland declared the Irish Republican Army a proscribed organisation.

A cabinet reshuffle in 1936 saw Boland become Minister for Lands. The Land Act 1939 which reformed land distribution, broadening the criteria by which the state could take control over undeveloped land while offering the tenant of the land more favourable terms of compensation. Boland was critical of the policy of the Minister for Industry and Commerce, Seán Lemass, of centralising industrial development in Dublin; Boland instead wished to see a more decentralised economy based around food production. The differing viewpoint caused a rift between Boland and Lemass, but despite this Boland favoured Lemass's policy of state intervention in the economy over Seán MacEntee's more Laissez-faire approach.

In 1937 Boland was highly vocal during the drafting of a new constitution of Ireland by Fianna Fáil against any word which would have given the Catholic Church special status, something heavily considered at the time. Boland declared that if the constitution elevated the position of the Catholic Church above others, it would be sectarian, anti-republican, and a hindrance to any prospects of Irish reunification. As a compromise, the term "special position" was used in the approved text of the Constitution.

=== Minister for Justice ===
Following the outbreak of World War II in 1939, known in Ireland as the Emergency, there was a cabinet reshuffle, and Boland was appointed as Minister for Justice. He took over at a time when the IRA had once again declared war against the British state and had begun their Sabotage Campaign. Boland was charged with the task of crushing the organisation and preventing the IRA from drawing the Irish state into conflict with the UK. Although Boland always considered himself a Republican, he took a hardline against the IRA and used his powers to order the internment of hundreds of IRA members before introducing military courts and special criminal courts.

In 1940, several imprisoned IRA members went on hunger strike, Boland, however, refused to grant their release. Two of the men eventually died, one of whom was the nephew of one of Boland's Fianna Fáil colleagues. Tony D'Arcy died as a result of a 52-day hunger strike (16 April 1940) at the age of 32 and Jack McNeela died three days later (19 April 1940) after 55 days on hunger strike. These deaths sparked reprisals by the IRA on the Garda Síochána. Boland subsequently introduced tougher measures by setting up a military court with the death penalty with no provision for appeal except for a review by the government. In all, twelve men were found guilty with six of them facing death and the remaining six having their sentences changed to imprisonment. Amongst those executed was Charlie Kerins, an acting Chief of Staff of the IRA.

As Minister of Justice, Boland was also asked to enforce policies of wartime censorship, however, finding the idea of the state censorship distasteful he established a censorship board to avoid accusations of bias.

During the Emergency, Boland was also responsible for the detention of several foreign agents in pursuit of Ireland's strict policy of neutrality. During this time some 500 individuals were interned and 600 were sentenced under the newly introduced Offences against the State Act, 1939. By 1943 the IRA were in disarray, particularly after the Chief of Staff was arrested and imprisoned, leaving the organisation without leadership. Boland and Fianna Fáil felt their hardline was backed by the electorate following strong returns for the party at the 1944 general election.

In 1947, Boland was amongst four leading Fianna Fáil figures (including de Valera) involved in the "Locke's Distillery Scandal", an accusation brought by Oliver J. Flanagan that foreign businessmen were bribing members of Fianna Fáil to gain the right to purchase the distillery. A tribunal of inquiry found no evidence to support the claims, but event tainted the public's view of Fianna Fáil.

==== Second term as Minister of Justice ====
By 1948, Fianna Fáil had been in government for an uninterrupted 16 years. With World War II finally over, the electorate sought change and a fresh start. Arising to meet this desire was the new political party Clann na Poblachta. Led by Seán MacBride, this new party sought to kick off a new post-war political era in Ireland, and to do this meant removing Fianna Fáil from power. Many in Clann na Poblachta had Republican backgrounds and in some ways, the party could be partially described as an organic reaction to Fianna Fáil and Boland's hardline stance during the war years. Many in political circles, including inside Fianna Fáil, thought Clann na Poblachta could be a new force to reckon with.

However, de Valera always held a reputation for being cunning in selecting the dates of general elections, and he once again cemented that notion, when he called for a general election in early 1948 before Clann na Poblachta, was completely ready to contest a national election. At the 1948 general election Clann na Poblachta and other Fianna Fáil opponents did well, but not as well as expected. To remove Fianna Fáil from government, every single party in the Dáil and several independents had to form the unwieldy "First Inter-Party Government". The coalition saw Clann na Poblachta forced to work with Fine Gael, considered the traditional "enemy" of Irish Republicanism. By 1951 the coalition collapsed and Fianna Fáil returned to government following that year's election, with Boland re-appointed Minister for Justice.

=== Later years ===
Boland did not seek ministerial office in 1957 when Fianna Fáil returned to power after its defeat in 1954. However, his son, Kevin, was appointed to the cabinet as Minister for Defence at the beginning of his first term in the Dáil. By this stage, Boland was beginning to be seen as an ageing warhorse, with his base in Roscommon starting to slip and Fianna Fáil unhappy that Boland was unable to get a Fianna Fáil running mate elected alongside himself.

At the 1961 general election, Boland was defeated for the first time in fourteen general election campaigns. Despite losing his Dáil seat, he subsequently secured election to Seanad Éireann. Four years later in 1965, he returned to the Seanad, this time as a nominee by the Taoiseach Seán Lemass.

In 1970, the outbreak of the Arms Crisis saw Kevin Boland resign as a Minister and as Secretary of Fianna Fáil in protest at the government's policy on Northern Ireland and in response to the sackings of Charles Haughey and Neil Blaney from the cabinet over allegations they had arranged for weapons to be provided to the Provisional IRA. Gerald Boland, in a similar protest, resigned as a vice president and as a trustee of Fianna Fáil, although he remained a member of the party. He also articulated his loss of confidence in the leadership of Taoiseach Jack Lynch.

== Death ==
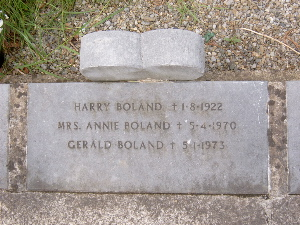
Boland's grave in the Republican Plot in Glasnevin Cemetery in Dublin

Gerald Boland died in Dublin at the age of 87 on 5 January 1973. His wife, Annie Boland, predeceased him in 1970. He was survived by his three daughters and four sons.

== See also ==
- Stephen Kelly, Gerald Boland: A Life (Dublin, 2024). See https://wordwellbooks.com/index.php?route=product/product&product_id=2111
- Families in the Oireachtas
- List of members of the Oireachtas imprisoned during the Irish revolutionary period

Political offices
Preceded by Eamonn Duggan	Government Chief Whip; 1932–1933	Succeeded by Patrick Little
Preceded by Joseph Connolly	Minister for Posts and Telegraphs; 1933–1936	Succeeded by Oscar Traynor
Preceded by Frank Aiken	Minister for Lands; 1936–1939	Succeeded by Thomas Derrig
Preceded by P. J. Ruttledge	Minister for Justice; 1939–1948	Succeeded by Seán Mac Eoin
Preceded by Daniel Morrissey	Minister for Justice; 1951–1954	Succeeded by James Everett

Dáil	Election	Deputy (Party)	Deputy (Party)	Deputy (Party)	Deputy (Party)
4th	1923	George Noble Plunkett (Rep)	Henry Finlay (CnaG)	Gerald Boland (Rep)	Andrew Lavin (CnaG)
4th	1925 by-election	George Noble Plunkett (Rep)	Martin Conlon (CnaG)	Gerald Boland (Rep)	Andrew Lavin (CnaG)
5th	1927 (Jun)	Patrick O'Dowd (FF)	Martin Conlon (CnaG)	Gerald Boland (FF)	Michael Brennan (Ind.)
6th	1927 (Sep)	Patrick O'Dowd (FF)	Martin Conlon (CnaG)	Gerald Boland (FF)	Michael Brennan (Ind.)
7th	1932	Daniel O'Rourke (FF)	Martin Conlon (CnaG)	Gerald Boland (FF)	Frank MacDermot (NCP)
8th	1933	Patrick O'Dowd (FF)	Michael Brennan (CnaG)	Gerald Boland (FF)	Frank MacDermot (NCP)
9th	1937	Michael Brennan (FG)	Daniel O'Rourke (FF)	Gerald Boland (FF)	3 seats 1937–1948
10th	1938	Michael Brennan (FG)	Daniel O'Rourke (FF)	Gerald Boland (FF)	3 seats 1937–1948
11th	1943	John Meighan (CnaT)	John Beirne (CnaT)	Gerald Boland (FF)	3 seats 1937–1948
12th	1944	Daniel O'Rourke (FF)	John Beirne (CnaT)	Gerald Boland (FF)	3 seats 1937–1948
13th	1948	Daniel O'Rourke (FF)	John Beirne (CnaT)	Gerald Boland (FF)	Jack McQuillan (CnaP)
14th	1951	John Finan (CnaT)	John Beirne (CnaT)	Gerald Boland (FF)	Jack McQuillan (Ind.)
15th	1954	James Burke (FG)	John Beirne (CnaT)	Gerald Boland (FF)	Jack McQuillan (Ind.)
16th	1957	James Burke (FG)	John Beirne (CnaT)	Gerald Boland (FF)	Jack McQuillan (Ind.)
17th	1961	James Burke (FG)	Patrick J. Reynolds (FG)	Brian Lenihan Snr (FF)	Jack McQuillan (NPD)
17th	1964 by-election	Joan Burke (FG)	Patrick J. Reynolds (FG)	Brian Lenihan Snr (FF)	Jack McQuillan (NPD)
18th	1965	Joan Burke (FG)	Patrick J. Reynolds (FG)	Brian Lenihan Snr (FF)	Hugh Gibbons (FF)
19th	1969	Constituency abolished. See Roscommon–Leitrim			

Dáil	Election	Deputy (Party)	Deputy (Party)	Deputy (Party)
22nd	1981	Terry Leyden (FF)	Seán Doherty (FF)	John Connor (FG)
23rd	1982 (Feb)	Terry Leyden (FF)	Seán Doherty (FF)	Liam Naughten (FG)
24th	1982 (Nov)	Terry Leyden (FF)	Seán Doherty (FF)	Liam Naughten (FG)
25th	1987	Terry Leyden (FF)	Seán Doherty (FF)	Liam Naughten (FG)
26th	1989	Terry Leyden (FF)	Tom Foxe (Ind.)	John Connor (FG)
27th	1992	Constituency abolished. See Longford–Roscommon		
