= James Boland =

Irish republican

James Boland (6 October 1856 – 11 March 1895) was a member of the Irish Republican Brotherhood (IRB) who was linked to the Irish National Invincibles. He was the father of republican revolutionaries and politicians Harry, Gerald, Ned and Kathleen Boland.

== Early life ==
James Boland was born in Manchester, Lancashire, England, in 1856. His parents, Patrick Boland and Eliza Boland née Kelly, were both Famine emigrants from Connacht in Ireland. His father was reputed to be a member of the IRB and his mother was a first cousin of Col. Thomas Kelly.

Patrick and his brothers may have been involved in the IRB campaign to rescue Kelly and Timothy Deasy from a Manchester police van. Ten-year-old Jim is thought to have been a scout for the party that attacked the van and killed a police officer. As he grew older, he became more involved in the movement himself.

== Ireland ==
Boland moved to Dublin in around 1881 and became a foreman with a company, paving the streets of Smithfield. He was transferred from the Manchester Fenians to the Dublin section. He married Kate Woods in 1882.

He was awarded the Royal Humane Society's medal in the same year for 'jumping off the Metal Bridge' to save a life.

His involvement in the Invincibles and the Phoenix Park Murders remains unclear. He worked with Joe Brady and was named by informers as a member of the IRB's Dublin Directory in 1882, while another informer named him as a member of the Invincibles and claimed that he gave orders to Brady. He was questioned at Dublin Castle, but when a warrant was issued for his arrest on 25 January 1883, he and Kate had fled to New York.

== New York ==
Boland found work as an engineer with De Castro & Donner, a sugar-refining company in Brooklyn. He also became involved in Clan na Gael and got to know John Devoy very well. He may have secretly returned to Ireland in 1883 as he is reputed to have taken part in IRB meetings that are believed to have led to the formation of the Gaelic Athletic Association (GAA). According to his grandson Kevin Boland, he was in attendance, as a member of the already established General Council, at the historic meeting in Hayes' Hotel.

His first child, Nellie, was born in America, while his second child, Gerald was conceived there, but born in Manchester in May 1885.

== Return to Ireland ==
The Boland family returned to Dublin in 1885, where Jim resumed work with the Dublin Corporation. This time he was directly employed,and by 1891 had been promoted from foreman to overseer. He was a leading figure in the Paviors' Society. He was also under continuous surveillance by the police as his IRB role continued. He was named number 59 of 63 'dangerous Fenians' in the Dublin Metropolitan Police District in September 1886.

The Bolands' third child, Harry, was born in 1887. Boland's involvement in the nationalist movement increased and, after the split over Charles Stewart Parnell's leadership of the Irish Parliamentary Party, he became one of the main Parnellite organisers in Dublin. At Parnell's funeral procession in 1891, he and seven colleagues headed a contingent of 2,000, each wielding a camán (hurley) draped in black. He also organised the funeral of his friend Pat Nally, a former member of the IRB's Supreme Council with whom Jim had originally conspired in Manchester.

In 1892, he was brought before the courts charged with keeping drink for the purposes of sale without a license. In court, Boland was able to show that, in fact, the premises was the new premises of the Nally Branch of the GAA and that the bar was attached to the club. The case was dismissed.

He was elected President of the Dublin County Committee of the GAA in 1892 and to the Dublin seat of GAA Central Council for the next two years. The Bolands had two more children, Kathleen in 1889 and Ned in 1893.

In 1894, Jim was elected to the Supreme Council of the IRB.

== Death ==
Boland fell ill in October 1894 with a serious brain disorder. He had received head injuries at two previous incidents. According to accounts, he was hit in the head protecting Parnell from assailants before his last trip to Wicklow, and developed concussion. The injury also caused an undetected skull fracture. He was also involved in a bombing of the offices of the Parnell's newspaper United Ireland in 1891 following an attempted takeover by Healyites, during which he was struck in the head.

He failed to recover and died on 11 March 1895. Around 1,500 mourners on foot followed his open hearse at his funeral. The group included three members of parliament, eight city councillors and prominent Nationalists, including Arthur Griffith, James Bermingham and Fred Allan. Following his death, two funds were raised to save his wife and young family from destitution. Enough money was raised to acquire a tobacconists business for Kate Boland.
