= William Proctor Bolland =

English cricketer

William Procter Bolland (1815 – 10 June 1863) was an English first-class cricketer active 1836–43 who played for Marylebone Cricket Club (MCC). He was born in Westminster and died in Clifton, Bristol. He appeared in nine first-class matches.

== Bibliography ==
- Frederic Boase. "Bolland, William Proctor". Modern English Biography. Netherton and Worth. 1892. Volume 1. Page 329. Google Books
- John Venn and J A Venn (eds). "Bolland, William Proctor". Alumni Cantabrigienses. Cambridge University Press. Volume 2 (1752 to 1900). Part 1 (Abbey to Challis). 1940. Google Books. Reprinted 2011. Page 311.
- M C Rintoul. "Bolland, William Proctor". Dictionary of Real People and Places in Fiction. Routledge. 1993. Page 213.
- Charles Shaw. "Bolland, William Procter". The Inns of Court Calendar. Butterworths. Fleet Street, London. 1877. Page 148.
- Haygarth, Arthur (1862). Scores & Biographies, Volume 2 (1827–1840). Lillywhite.
- Frederick Samuel Ashley-Cooper. Nottinghamshire Cricket and Cricketers. H B Saxton. 1923. Page 48. Google Books.
- Nigel McCrery. "I Zinghari". Final Wicket. Pen & Sword Military. 2015. Page 471.
- William Bolland. Cricket Notes. Trelawney Saunders. Charing Cross, London. 1851. Google Books.
- William Proctor Bolland, "A Disconcerted Lover" (1832) Eton College Magazine, No 5, xii and 167
