= Boleń (bay) =

Bay in West Pomeranian Voivodeship, Poland

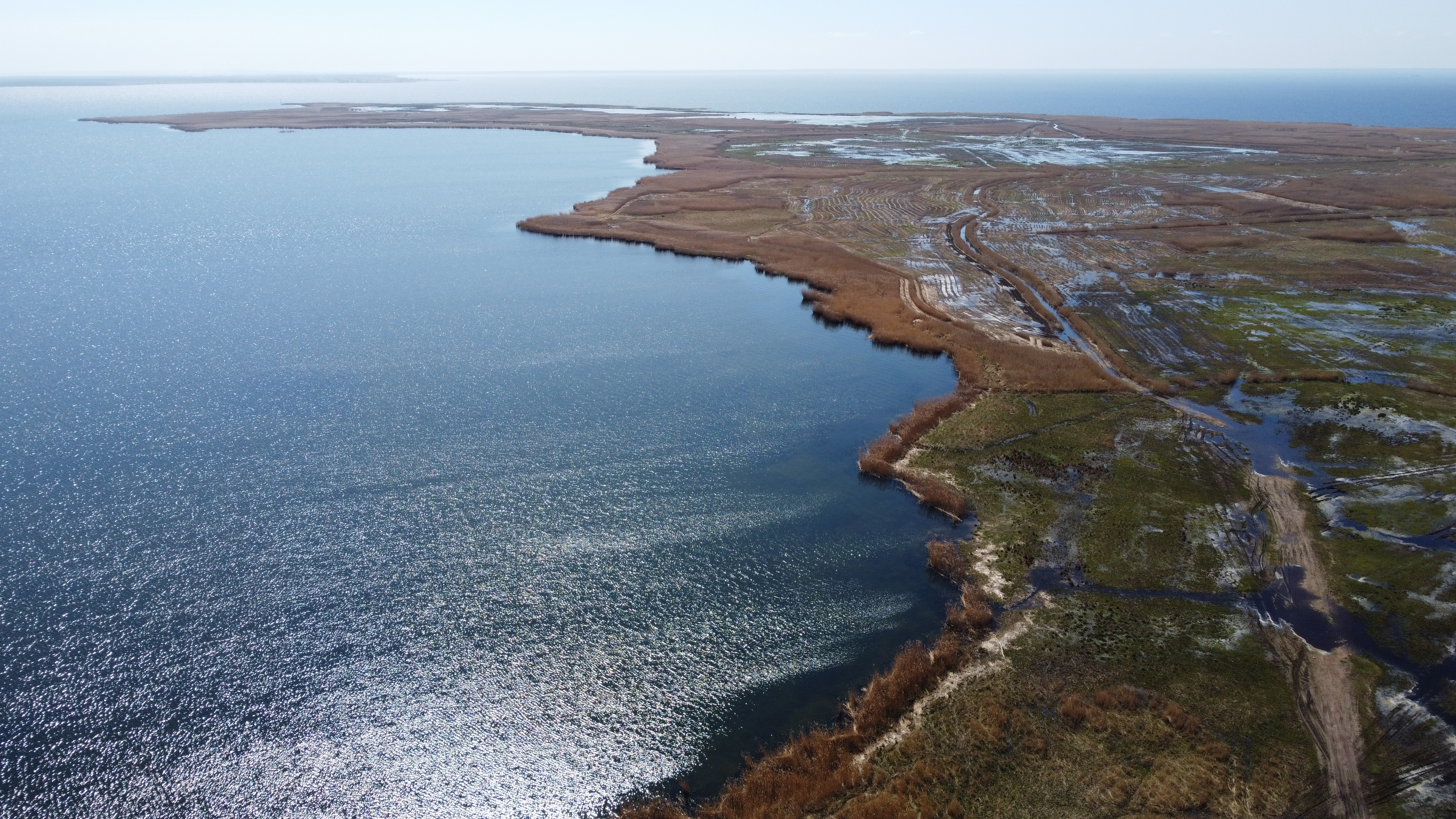
- The bay of Boleń, and Rów peninsula on the island of Wolin.
- Interactive map of Boleń
- Location: Wolin Municipality, Kamień County, West Pomeranian Voivodeship, Poland
- Coordinates: 53°49′47″N 14°34′33″E
- Type: Bay
- Part of: Szczecin Lagoon
- Settlements: Wolin

Boleń (Polish: [ˈbɔ.lɛɲ]) is a bay of the Szczecin Lagoon, located in its southern portion, next to the island of Wolin. It is placed next to the town of Wolin, in the West Pomeranian Voivodeship, Poland, within the municipality of Wolin in Kamień County. To the south and east, it borders Rów peninsula, and to the north from it is located Płocin Shallow.
