= Mike Boland =

Mike Boland may refer to:

- Michael Boland (cinematographer) (1949–2025), Canadian ice hockey player turned documentary cinematographer
- Mike Boland (ice hockey, born 1954) (1954–2017), played for the Buffalo Sabres and the Kansas City Scouts of the NHL
- Mike Boland (politician) (born 1942), served in Illinois House of Representatives 1995–2010
- Mike Boland (actor) (born 1965), American television, stage, and film actor
