= Bowland High =

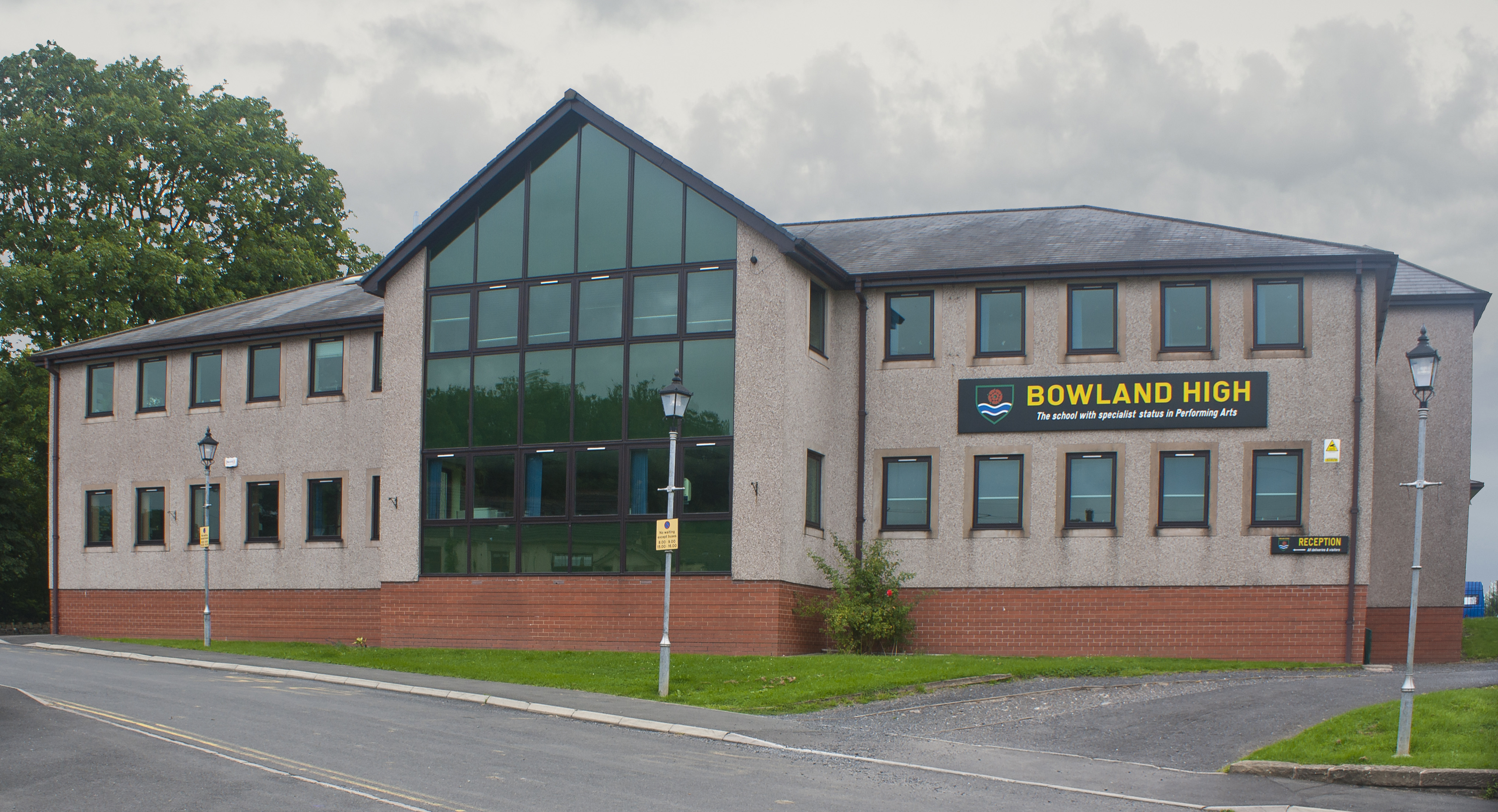
- Main building (2013)

Location
- Riversmead; Grindleton, Lancashire, BB7 4QS; England; 53.9115°N 2.3525°W

Information
- Type: Academy
- Established: 1949
- Department for Education URN: 136997 Tables
- Ofsted: Reports
- Head teacher: Laura Fielden
- Gender: Coeducational
- Age: 11 to 16
- Enrolment: 550
- Capacity: 575
- Website: bowland.atctrust.org.uk

Bowland High is a coeducational secondary school with academy status, located in Grindleton in Lancashire, England. It educates pupils from ages 11–16, and as of 2022 has approximately 550 pupils.

== History ==
The main building dates from 1865. It was originally opened as Foxley Bank Hydro, later to become a hotel in the Edwardian era. In 1923, it became a National Children's Home orphanage under the direction of Sister Ella Curnock. Later, it was developed into a wartime home for refugee children from Europe, still under the auspices of the National Children's Home organisation.

In 1989, the refugees had a 50th anniversary reunion at the school and a film, They came to Riversmead, was produced for television to commemorate the event.

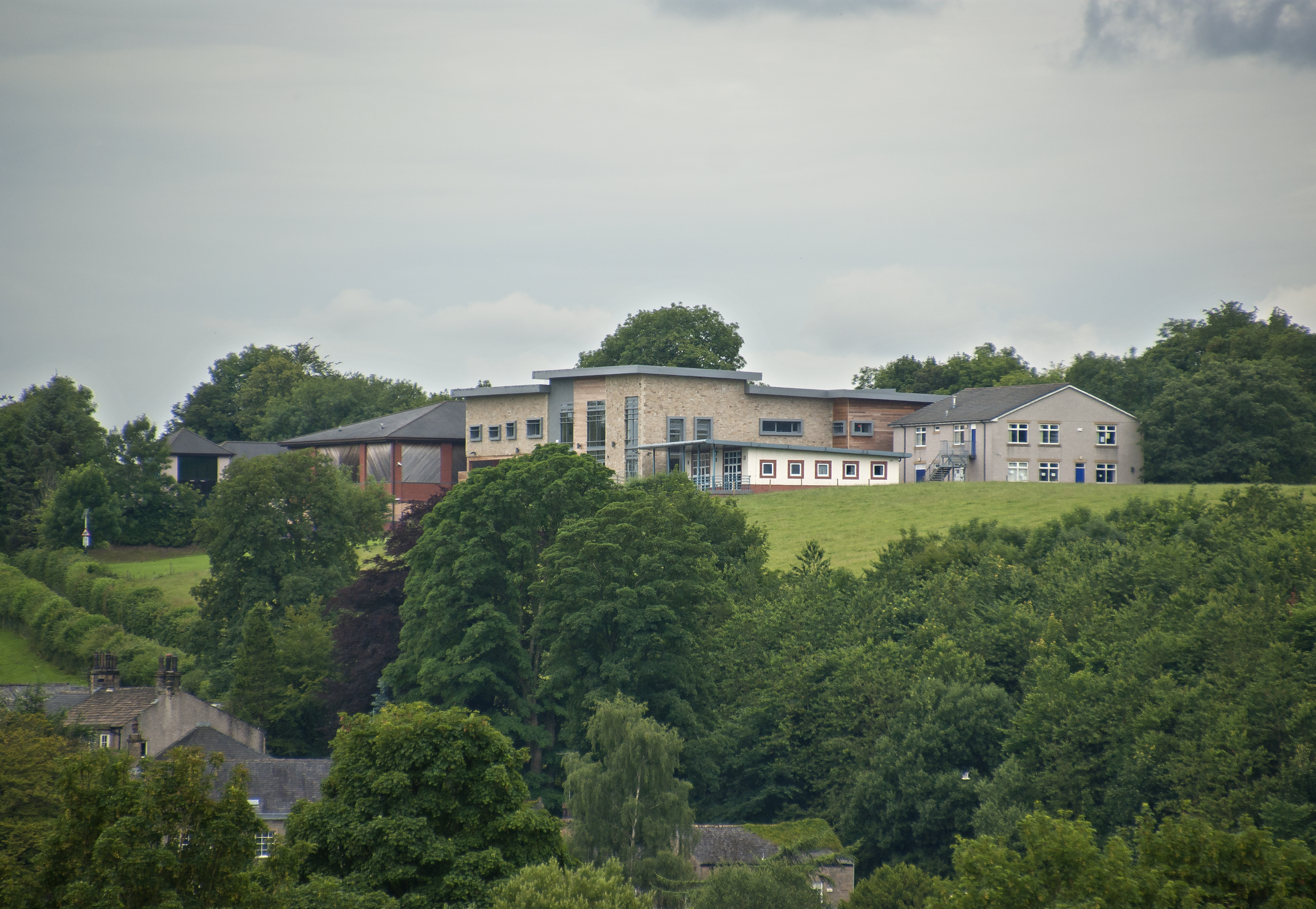
View of the school grounds (2015)

The building was opened as a secondary school in 1949. It was previously known as Grindleton Riversmead Secondary Modern School and then as Bowland County Secondary School.

The conversion to an academy was resisted by staff in 2011.

== School performance ==
As of 2020, the school's most recent Ofsted inspection was in 2016, with a judgement of Outstanding.

== Notable former pupils ==
- Samantha Murray, pentathlete
