= Olav Bolland =

Norwegian civil servant

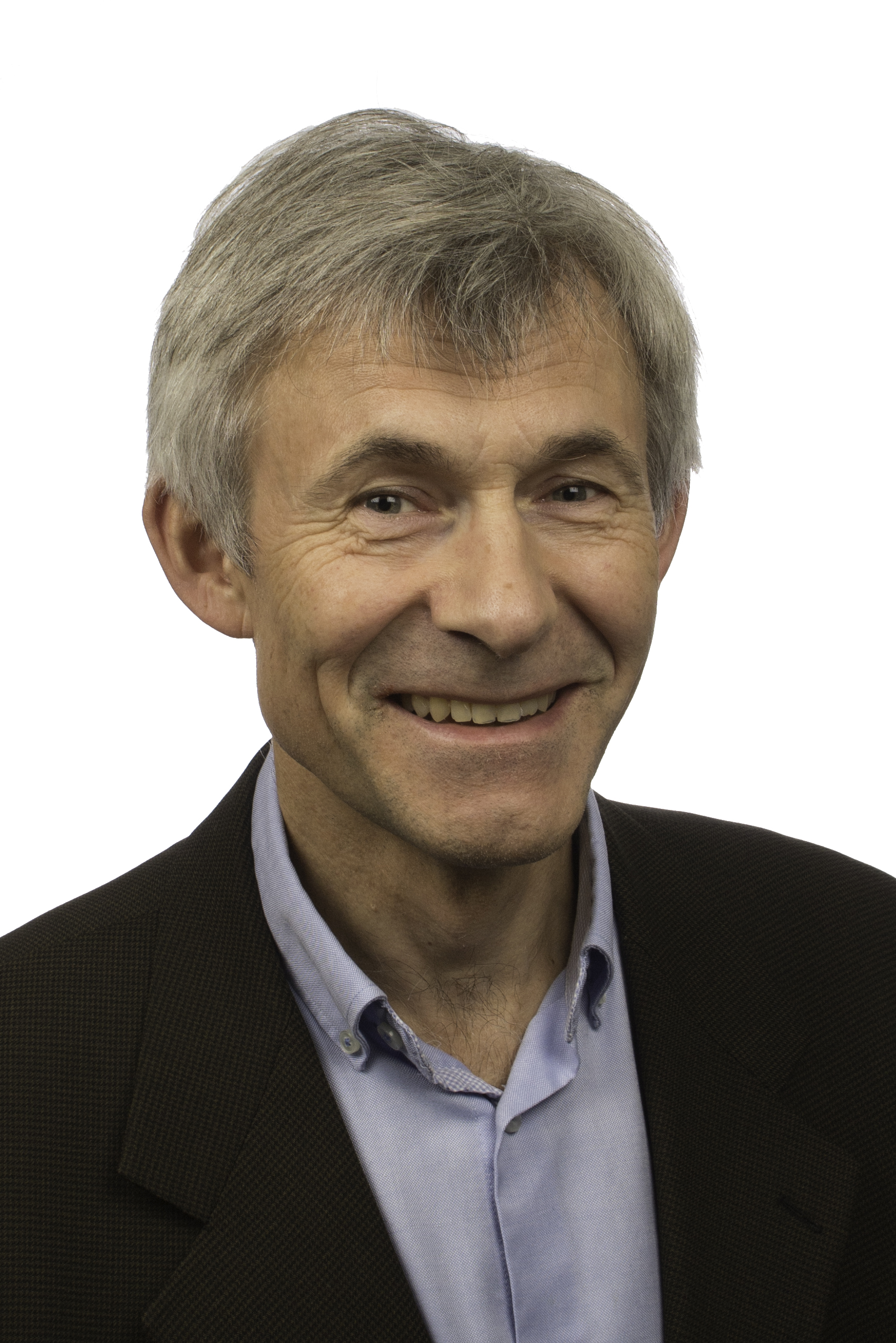
- Born: January 17, 1962 (age 64); Ler Norway
- Occupations: Dean at the Faculty of Engineering at the Norwegian University of Science and Technology; Professor in Energy and Process Engineering
- Known for: Thermal power generation & CO2 capture
- Children: 3

Olav Bolland (born 17 January 1962) is a Norwegian researcher and Professor in Energy and Process Engineering. His specialization is in thermal power generation, carbon capture and storage, particle technology and drying. He has been Dean at the Faculty of Engineering at the Norwegian University of Science and Technology – NTNU since August 2017.

== Career ==
Professor Bolland completed his MSc and PhD degrees in mechanical engineering at the Norwegian Institute of Technology (NTH), one of the precursors of the Norwegian University of Science and Technology - NTNU. From 1990 he was associate professor at NTNU until he was appointed Professor in 2002 at the Department of Energy and Process Engineering. He was Head of the Department of Energy and Process Engineering at the Norwegian University of Science and Technology – NTNU from 2009 to 2017.

In 2003–2005, he contributed to the IPCC reports, the institution which was awarded the 2007 Nobel Peace Prize. Professor Bolland was a lead author for the IPCC Special report on Carbon Dioxide Capture and Storage.

He was director of the Gas Technology Centre NTNU-SINTEF from 2008 to 2009. He was Associate Editor of the International Journal of Greenhouse Gas Control in the period 2006 to 2013.

Olav Bolland is a fellow of the Norwegian Academy of Technological Sciences.

== Awards ==
In 2011, Olav Bolland was awarded the Statoil Annual Award for Outstanding Research for his work on enhancing carbon capture understanding and processes for reducing emissions.
