= Kevin Boland =

Irish politician (1917–2001)

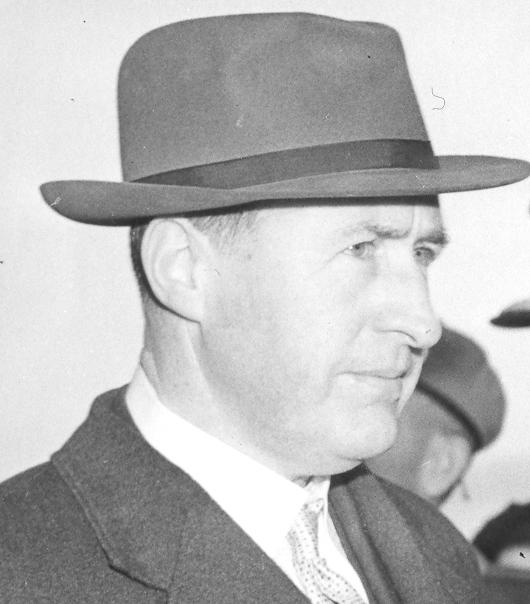
- Boland in 1960

Leader of Aontacht Éireann
- In office 19 September 1971 – 27 June 1976
- Preceded by: Position established
- Succeeded by: Position abolished

Minister for Social Welfare
- In office 2 July 1969 – 9 May 1970
- Taoiseach: Jack Lynch
- Preceded by: Joseph Brennan
- Succeeded by: Joseph Brennan
- In office 11 November 1961 – 10 November 1966
- Taoiseach: Seán Lemass
- Preceded by: Seán MacEntee
- Succeeded by: Joseph Brennan

Minister for Local Government
- In office 10 November 1966 – 9 May 1970
- Taoiseach: Jack Lynch
- Preceded by: Neil Blaney
- Succeeded by: Bobby Molloy

Minister for Defence
- In office 20 March 1957 – 11 November 1961
- Taoiseach: Seán Lemass
- Preceded by: Seán Mac Eoin
- Succeeded by: Gerald Bartley

Teachta Dála
- In office June 1969 – 4 November 1970
- Constituency: Dublin County South
- In office March 1957 – June 1969
- Constituency: Dublin County

Personal details
- Born: 15 October 1917 Dublin, Ireland
- Died: 23 September 2001 (aged 83) Dublin, Ireland
- Party: Fianna Fáil
- Other political affiliations: Aontacht Éireann (1971–1976)
- Spouse: Cecilia Boland
- Children: 4
- Parent: Gerald Boland (father)
- Relatives: James Boland (grandfather); Harry Boland (uncle)
- Education: St Joseph's, Fairview

Kevin Boland (15 October 1917 – 23 September 2001) was an Irish Fianna Fáil politician who served as Leader of Aontacht Éireann from 1971 to 1976, Minister for Social Welfare from 1961 to 1966 and 1969 to 1970, Minister for Local Government from 1966 to 1970 and Minister for Defence from 1957 to 1961. He served as a Teachta Dála (TD) from 1957 to 1970.

He is one of eight TDs appointed as a Minister at the beginning of their first term in the Dáil.

== Early life and career ==
Boland was born in Dublin in 1917. He attended St. Joseph's C.B.S. in Fairview, leaving in 1933. He was the son of Gerald Boland, a founder-member of Fianna Fáil, and the nephew of Harry Boland. Boland served as an officer in the Irish Army's Corps of Engineers during the Emergency (1939–1945), where he was involved in attempts to break German legation codes. Despite this, the young Boland failed to get elected to Dáil Éireann on his first two attempts, standing in the Dublin County constituency at the 1951 general election and again at the 1954 general election. Double success followed at the 1957 general election, when he was not only elected to the 16th Dáil but was appointed to the cabinet as Minister for Defence on his very first day in the Dáil. This was due to the retirement of his father, who had served in every Fianna Fáil government since 1932.

The Defence portfolio was largely considered a safe and uncontroversial position, so Boland made only a small impact. As a Minister, he displayed a fáinne (gold ring) on the lapel of his jacket, which indicated that he was able and willing to speak the Irish language. He frequently conducted his governmental business in Irish, which he was very good at; he had won awards for it in school. In 1961, he was moved from Defence to become the Minister for Social Welfare. He remained there until the retirement in 1966 of the Taoiseach, Seán Lemass, when Fianna Fáil faced the first leadership contest in its history. He was then appointed Minister for Local Government which post he held until he left government in 1970.

The leadership race immediately erupted as a two-horse battle between Charles Haughey and George Colley. Both of these men epitomised the new kind of professional politician of the 1960s. Things changed when Neil Blaney indicated his interest in running. Boland supported him in his campaign, as both men hailed from the republican and left wing of the party. There was talk at one point of Boland himself entering the leadership race. In the end Jack Lynch was chosen as a compromise, and he became the new Taoiseach. Boland was appointed as Minister for Local Government in the new government.

== Arms Crisis ==
In 1969, events in Northern Ireland caused political chaos over the border in Ireland. It was the start of The Troubles in Northern Ireland and Fianna Fáil's policy with regard to the North was coming into question. One crisis meeting was held after another, in which the possibility of decisive action was discussed. The "hawks" in the cabinet urged a symbolic invasion of Northern Ireland to protect nationalists near the border, and to draw international attention, while the "doves", who ultimately prevailed, urged caution. These cabinet meetings were heated events. On one occasion Boland was said to have been so angry that he resigned not only his cabinet position but also his Dáil seat and went home to his farm in County Dublin to make hay. The resignations were rejected by the Taoiseach, Jack Lynch, after a calming-down period. In what became known as the Arms Crisis two ministers, Charles Haughey and Neil Blaney, were sacked from the government in May 1970, for allegedly being involved in a plot to import arms for Republicans in the North. Boland resigned in solidarity with them and in protest about the government's position on the North. Later that year his criticism of the Taoiseach (whom Boland and many others within the Party maintained had authorized the arms importation) led to his expulsion from the Fianna Fáil party. Boland resigned as a TD on 4 November 1970.

One of Boland's most famous incidents took place at the Fianna Fáil Ardfheis in 1971. Just before Jack Lynch's speech Boland stormed a nearby podium, interrupting Patrick Hillery in the middle of his speech. Boland openly defied the party leadership and his opponents, holding his arms wide open and shouting to the crowd, "Come on up and put me down." While there was a lot of booing and clapping in an effort to drown him out, many of his supporters started cheering and chanting "We want Boland." An enraged Patrick Hillery grabbed his microphone and famously replied, "If you want a fight you can have it … You can have Boland, but you can't have Fianna Fáil." At this point the government supporters went ecstatic with cheering and Boland was carried out of the hall.

== Political decline and retirement ==
Boland founded his own political party, Aontacht Éireann (Irish Unity) in 1971. It won very little support and Boland himself failed to be elected to the Dáil in 1973, which effectively ended his political career. Boland and his colleagues resigned from the party in 1976 after it was taken over by a number of far-right individuals. He remained an outspoken critic of the Republic's Northern Ireland policy, particularly the Sunningdale Agreement. He made one last attempt to reclaim a Dáil seat, standing unsuccessfully in the Dublin South-West constituency at the 1981 general election. He then retired from public life completely.

In 1996, he sued the Irish Independent for libel after a 28 January 1993 article incorrectly stated that he had appeared before the court in the Arms Trial in 1970 and had been dismissed as a Minister by Taoiseach Jack Lynch. He was awarded £75,000 in damages.

Kevin Boland died in Dublin on 23 September 2001.

== Books ==
Boland wrote a series of political books, including his self-published autobiography, Up Dev!:

- Boland, Kevin (1972). 'We Won't Stand (Idly) By'. Dublin: Kelly Lane Limited.
- Boland, Kevin (1977). Up Dev!. Dublin: Published by author.
- Boland, Kevin (1980). Great My Shame. Dublin: Published by author.
- Boland, Kevin (1982). The Rise and Decline of Fianna Fáil. Dublin & Cork: Mercier Press. ISBN 0-85342-683-X.
- Boland, Kevin (1984). Fine Gael: British or Irish?. Dublin & Cork: Mercier Press. ISBN 0-85342-709-7.
- Boland, Kevin (1988). Under Contract With The Enemy. Cork & Dublin: Mercier Press. ISBN 0-85342-872-7.

== See also ==
- Families in the Oireachtas

Political offices
Preceded by Seán Mac Eoin	Minister for Defence; 1957–1961	Succeeded by Gerald Bartley
Preceded by Seán MacEntee	Minister for Social Welfare; 1961–1966	Succeeded by Joseph Brennan
Preceded by Neil Blaney	Minister for Local Government; 1966–1970	Succeeded by Bobby Molloy
Preceded by Joseph Brennan	Minister for Social Welfare; 1969–1970	Succeeded by Joseph Brennan
Party political offices
New political party	Leader of Aontacht Éireann; 1971–1976	Position abolished

Dáil	Election	Deputy (Party)	Deputy (Party)	Deputy (Party)	Deputy (Party)	Deputy (Party)	Deputy (Party)	Deputy (Party)	Deputy (Party)
2nd	1921	Michael Derham (SF)	George Gavan Duffy (SF)	Séamus Dwyer (SF)	Desmond FitzGerald (SF)	Frank Lawless (SF)	Margaret Pearse (SF)	6 seats 1921–1923	
3rd	1922	Michael Derham (PT-SF)	George Gavan Duffy (PT-SF)	Thomas Johnson (Lab)	Desmond FitzGerald (PT-SF)	Darrell Figgis (Ind)	John Rooney (FP)	6 seats 1921–1923	
4th	1923	Michael Derham (CnaG)	Bryan Cooper (Ind)	Thomas Johnson (Lab)	Desmond FitzGerald (CnaG)	Darrell Figgis (Ind)	John Good (Ind)	Kathleen Lynn (Rep)	Kevin O'Higgins (CnaG)
4th	1924 by-election	Batt O'Connor (CnaG)	Bryan Cooper (Ind)	Thomas Johnson (Lab)	Desmond FitzGerald (CnaG)	Darrell Figgis (Ind)	John Good (Ind)	Kathleen Lynn (Rep)	Kevin O'Higgins (CnaG)
4th	1926 by-election	Batt O'Connor (CnaG)	Bryan Cooper (Ind)	Thomas Johnson (Lab)	Desmond FitzGerald (CnaG)	William Norton (Lab)	John Good (Ind)	Kathleen Lynn (Rep)	Kevin O'Higgins (CnaG)
5th	1927 (Jun)	Batt O'Connor (CnaG)	Bryan Cooper (Ind)	Thomas Johnson (Lab)	Desmond FitzGerald (CnaG)	Patrick Belton (FF)	John Good (Ind)	Seán MacEntee (FF)	Kevin O'Higgins (CnaG)
5th	1927 by-election	Batt O'Connor (CnaG)	Bryan Cooper (Ind)	Thomas Johnson (Lab)	Desmond FitzGerald (CnaG)	Patrick Belton (FF)	John Good (Ind)	Seán MacEntee (FF)	Gearóid O'Sullivan (CnaG)
6th	1927 (Sep)	Batt O'Connor (CnaG)	Bryan Cooper (CnaG)	Joseph Murphy (Ind)	Desmond FitzGerald (CnaG)	Seán Brady (FF)	John Good (Ind)	Seán MacEntee (FF)	Gearóid O'Sullivan (CnaG)
6th	1930 by-election	Batt O'Connor (CnaG)	Thomas Finlay (CnaG)	Joseph Murphy (Ind)	Desmond FitzGerald (CnaG)	Seán Brady (FF)	John Good (Ind)	Seán MacEntee (FF)	Gearóid O'Sullivan (CnaG)
7th	1932	Batt O'Connor (CnaG)	Thomas Finlay (CnaG)	Patrick Curran (Lab)	Henry Dockrell (CnaG)	Seán Brady (FF)	John Good (Ind)	Seán MacEntee (FF)	Gearóid O'Sullivan (CnaG)
8th	1933	Batt O'Connor (CnaG)	John A. Costello (CnaG)	Margaret Mary Pearse (FF)	Henry Dockrell (CnaG)	Seán Brady (FF)	John Good (Ind)	Seán MacEntee (FF)	Gearóid O'Sullivan (CnaG)
8th	1935 by-election	Cecil Lavery (FG)	John A. Costello (CnaG)	Margaret Mary Pearse (FF)	Henry Dockrell (CnaG)	Seán Brady (FF)	John Good (Ind)	Seán MacEntee (FF)	Gearóid O'Sullivan (CnaG)
9th	1937	Cecil Lavery (FG)	Henry Dockrell (FG)	Gerrard McGowan (Lab)	Patrick Fogarty (FF)	Seán Brady (FF)	5 seats 1937–1948		
10th	1938	Patrick Belton (FG)	Henry Dockrell (FG)	Thomas Mullen (FF)	Patrick Fogarty (FF)	Seán Brady (FF)	5 seats 1937–1948		
11th	1943	Liam Cosgrave (FG)	Henry Dockrell (FG)	James Tunney (Lab)	Patrick Fogarty (FF)	Seán Brady (FF)	5 seats 1937–1948		
12th	1944	Liam Cosgrave (FG)	Henry Dockrell (FG)	Patrick Burke (FF)	Patrick Fogarty (FF)	Seán Brady (FF)	5 seats 1937–1948		
12th	1947 by-election	Liam Cosgrave (FG)	Henry Dockrell (FG)	Patrick Burke (FF)	Seán MacBride (CnaP)	Seán Brady (FF)	5 seats 1937–1948		
13th	1948	Éamon Rooney (FG)	Seán Dunne (Lab)	Patrick Burke (FF)	3 seats 1948–1961				
14th	1951	Éamon Rooney (FG)	Seán Dunne (Lab)	Patrick Burke (FF)	3 seats 1948–1961				
15th	1954	Éamon Rooney (FG)	Seán Dunne (Lab)	Patrick Burke (FF)	3 seats 1948–1961				
16th	1957	Éamon Rooney (FG)	Kevin Boland (FF)	Patrick Burke (FF)	3 seats 1948–1961				
17th	1961	Éamon Rooney (FG)	Kevin Boland (FF)	Patrick Burke (FF)	Mark Clinton (FG)	Seán Dunne (Ind)	5 seats 1961–1969		
18th	1965	Des Foley (FF)	Kevin Boland (FF)	Patrick Burke (FF)	Mark Clinton (FG)	Seán Dunne (Lab)	5 seats 1961–1969		
19th	1969	Constituency abolished. See Dublin County North and Dublin County South							

Dáil	Election	Deputy (Party)	Deputy (Party)	Deputy (Party)
19th	1969	Kevin Boland (FF)	Tom O'Higgins (FG)	Richard Burke (FG)
19th	1970 by-election	Larry McMahon (FG)	Tom O'Higgins (FG)	Richard Burke (FG)
20th	1973	Larry McMahon (FG)	Ruairí Brugha (FF)	Richard Burke (FG)
21st	1977	John Kelly (FG)	Niall Andrews (FF)	John Horgan (Lab)
22nd	1981	Constituency abolished. See Dublin South		
