= Cheryl Bolen =

American novelist

Cheryl Bolen is an American author, educator and journalist. She is known for writing more than 30 historical romance and romantic suspense novels, many of them set among Regency aristocrats in early 19th century England.

== Personal background ==
Cheryl Bolen is a New York Times and USA Today Bestselling Author. She was born in Los Angeles, California and is the daughter of Al and Betty (née Appleton) Williams, who were divorced in 1959. Later her mother remarried, and Bolen moved with her to Texas in the 1960s. She met her future husband, John Bolen, while they were students at San Jacinto College, and they married during their junior year in college.

When her husband went to graduate school at the University of Texas at Austin, she enrolled at UT, where she served on the staff of the Daily Texan. She earned a bachelor's degree in 1970 from the University of Texas with a double major in journalism and English. Bolen returned to Houston in 1971 when her husband accepted a teaching position at San Jacinto College. In 1979 she earned a Master of Science degree from the University of Houston at Clear Lake City while being a stay-at-home mother to their two sons.

== Professional background ==
Journalism

While pursuing her master's, Bolen worked on a freelance basis, writing news articles for various publication. In 1979, she accepted the position of news editor with the South Belt–Ellington Leader (a suburban Houston newspaper), where she won several awards from the Houston Press Club and Texas Community Newspaper Association for spot news reporting, feature writing, and headline writing.

Teaching

In 1985, Bolen left the South Belt Ellington Leader to teach language arts in the Pearland, Texas Independent School District. After teaching for six years, she returned to the Leader, where she remained on staff for six more years.

Fiction writing

Bolen's first romance novel (A Duke Deceived) was published by Harlequin Historical in 1998. For her first novel, she was named Notable New Author by the Ohio Valley Romance Writers of America. She has also written for Kensington Books, Love Inspired Historical, and Montlake Romance, which is a publishing imprint of Amazon.com. Bolen's books have won several awards, including the Holt Medallion and the International Digital Award. In 2011, she began self publishing her out-of-print titles and some originals as eBooks and has consistently been a bestselling author.

Since 1993 she has held membership in the RWA and has been awarded the Lady of the Realm award from it Beau Monde chapter which studies Regency England. She also belongs to Novelist Inc.

== Reviews ==
Her novels have been well received by critics. For example, Patty Engelmann reviewing With His Ring states, "The second in the series focusing on Bath by newcomer Bolen proves to be a winner with its lovable characters and slightly spicy but gentle-hearted story." John Charles reviewing One Golden Ring says, "A marriage of convenience turns passionate in Bolen's latest sinfully sexy Regency, which the author skillfully wraps up in a nice bit of Christmas cheer."

== Literary awards ==
- A Duke Deceived – Finalist for Best First Book, Holt Medallion 1999; Cheryl named Notable New Author 1999
- With His Ring – Finalist Best Historical, Texas Gold 2003
- An Improper Proposal – Finalist Best Historical, Texas Gold 2005
- Counterfeit Countess – Finalist Best Historical Mystery, Daphne du Maurier 2006
- One Golden Ring – Best Historical, Holt Medallion 2006
- My Lord Wicked – Best Historical eBook, International Digital Awards 2011
- With His Lady's Assistance – Finalist Best Historical eBook, International Digital Awards 2011
- The Earl's Bargain – Finalist Best Historical eBook, International Digital Awards 2011
- Christmas at Farley Manor – Best Novella, 2011 Romance Through the Ages
- The Theft Before Christmas – Finalist Best Historical eBook, International Digital Awards 2014
- A Christmas in Bath – Finalist Best Historical eBook, International Digital Awards 2014
- Oh What A (Wedding) Night – Finalist Best Historical eBook, International Digital Awards 2016

== Published works ==
Single Historical (set in Regency England)

- A Duke Deceived (Harlequin Historical, 1998: ISBN 978-0-373290-06-2)
- My Lord Wicked (ISBN 978-1-939602-08-4, 2011)
- The Earl's Bargain (ISBN 978-1-939602-07-7, 2011)
- His Lordship's Vow (ISBN 978-1-939602-10-7, 2012)

World War II Love Story

- It Had to Be You (ISBN 978-1-478129-77-6, 2011)

Brides of Bath Series (set in Regency England)

- The Bride Wore Blue (Kensington, 2002: ISBN 978-1-491025-49-9, Author Re-Issue 2013)
- With His Ring (Kensington, 2002: ISBN 978-1-491030-33-2, Author Re-Issue 2013)
- A Fallen Woman (Kensington, 2002) (eBook retitled The Bride's Secret ISBN 978-1-491042-77-9, Author Re-Issue 2013)
- An Improper Proposal (Kensington, 2004) (eBook retitled To Take This Lord ISBN 978-1-491042-93-9, Author Re-Issue 2013)
- Love In The Library (ISBN 978-1-939602-21-3, 2014)
- Christmas in Bath (ISBN 978-1-939602-16-9, 2014)

Brazen Brides Series (set in Regency England)

- Counterfeit Countess (Kensington, 2005: ISBN 978-0-821777-89-3)
- One Golden Ring (Kensington, 2005)
- Lady Sophia's Rescue (ISBN 978-1-939602-11-4, 2011 eBook novella)
- Marriage of Inconvenience (Love Inspired Historical, 2012)
- Miss Hastings' Excellent London Adventure (ISBN 978-1-939602-69-5, 2017)
- A Birmingham Family Christmas (ISBN 978-1-939602-77-0, 2017)

House of Haverstock Series (set in Regency England)

- A Lady by Chance (Kensington, 2000: ISBN 978-1-484975-02-2, Author Re-Issue 2013)
- "Duchess by Mistake" (ISBN 978-1-939602-33-6, Book 2 in the series, 2015)
- "Countess By Coincidence" (ISBN 978-1-939602-35-0, Book 3 in the series, 2015)
- "Ex-Spinster By Christmas" (ISBN 978-1-939602-57-2, Book 4 in the series, 2016)

Historical Anthologies/Novellas

- Fourth of July Picnic (Kensington, ISBN 978-0-821777-56-5, 2004)
- A Summer to Remember (ISBN 978-1-939602-17-6, 2012)
- Christmas Brides (ISBN 978-1-491050-97-2, 2012)
- Pride and Prejudice Sequels (ISBN 978-1-939602-53-4, 2016)

Regent Mysteries (set in Regency England)

- With His Lady's Assistance (ISBN 978-1-475165-98-2, 2011)
- A Most Discreet Inquiry (ISBN 978-1-482538-65-6, 2012)
- The Theft Before Christmas (ISBN 978-1-493593-35-4, 2013)
- An Egyptian Affair (ISBN 978-1-939602-41-1, 2015)

Lords of Eton

- The Portrait of Lady Wycliff (ISBN 978-1-939602-87-9, 2018)
- The Earl, the Vow, and the Plain Jane (ISBN 978-1-939602-91-6, 2018)

Contemporary Romantic Suspense (Texas Heroines in Peril)

- Protecting Britannia (ISBN 978-1-481109-34-5, 2012)
- Capitol Offense (ISBN 978-1-939602-15-2, 2012)
- A Cry in the Night (ISBN 978-1-939602-14-5, 2012)
- Murder at Veranda House (ISBN 978-1-491208-32-8, 2012)

Inspirational Historical Romance (set in Regency England)

- Marriage of Inconvenience (2012, Love Inspired Historical, Harlequin)

Amazon Serial (contemporary romantic suspense)

- Falling for Frederick January–April 2013 (Montlake Romance, ISBN 978-1-611099-68-3)

Non-Fiction

- England's Stately Homes By Train (ISBN 978-1-939602-23-7, 2014)
- "The Great Georgian Gambling Epidemic" The Regency Plume (May–June 2006)

online<
