= Harry Boland =

Irish republican and politician (1887–1922)

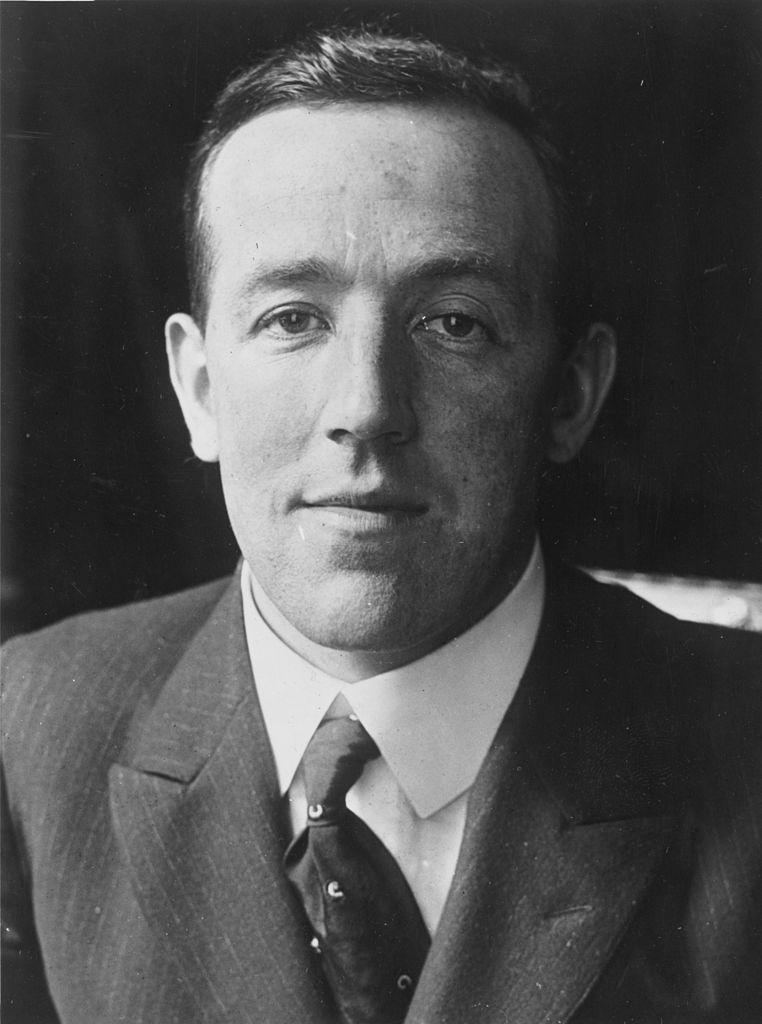
- Boland in 1919

President of the Irish Republican Brotherhood
- In office 1 May 1919 – 13 September 1920
- Preceded by: Seán McGarry
- Succeeded by: Patrick Moylett

Teachta Dála
- In office May 1921 – 1 August 1922
- Constituency: Mayo South–Roscommon South
- In office December 1918 – May 1921
- Constituency: Roscommon South

Personal details
- Born: Henry James Boland; 27 April 1887 Phibsborough, Dublin, Ireland
- Died: 1 August 1922 (aged 35) Merrion Road, Dublin, Ireland
- Resting place: Glasnevin Cemetery, Dublin, Ireland
- Party: Sinn Féin
- Parent: James Boland (father)
- Relatives: Gerald Boland (brother); Kevin Boland (nephew); Harry Boland (nephew)
- Education: Synge Street CBS

Military service
- Allegiance: Irish Republican Brotherhood; Irish Volunteers; Irish Republican Army
- Years of service: 1913–1922
- Battles/wars: Easter Rising; Irish War of Independence; Irish Civil War

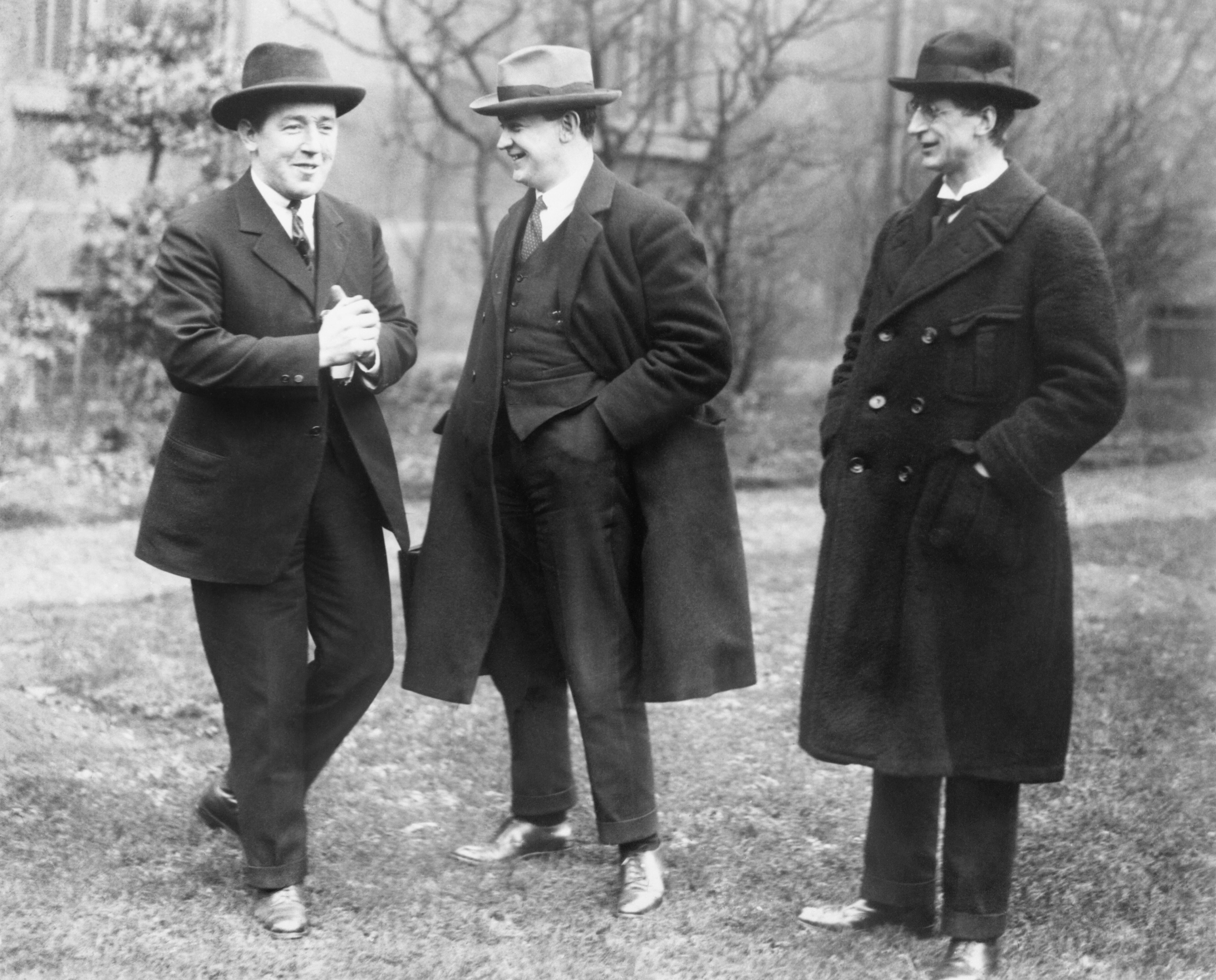
At the Mansion House in 1919 (left to right) - the republican politicians Harry Boland, Michael Collins and Éamon de Valera.

Harry Boland (27 April 1887 – 1 August 1922) was an Irish republican, politician, and revolutionary organiser who played a central role in the Irish separatist movement from the Easter Rising of 1916 through to the outbreak of the Irish Civil War in 1922. Born in Phibsborough, Dublin, into a Fenian family, he became an active member of the Irish Republican Brotherhood, the Irish Volunteers, the Gaelic Athletic Association, and Sinn Féin, and was closely associated with both Éamon de Valera and Michael Collins during the revolutionary period.

Boland took part in the Easter Rising of 1916 as part of the GPO garrison and was subsequently sentenced to ten years' penal servitude, serving time alongside de Valera in English prisons before being released under the general amnesty of June 1917. In the years that followed, he became one of the principal organisers of Sinn Féin's electoral machine, playing a key role in the party's landslide victory at the 1918 general election, in which he was himself elected MP for Roscommon South. He subsequently served as de Valera's special envoy to the United States, spending much of the Irish War of Independence in America organising political support and attempting to procure arms for the Irish Volunteers.

Following a return to Ireland, Boland voted against the Anglo-Irish Treaty in January 1922 and, despite sustained efforts to prevent a split, took up arms on the anti-Treaty side when the Civil War broke out in June 1922. He was shot by National Army soldiers during an attempted arrest at the Grand Hotel, Skerries, Co. Dublin, on 31 July 1922, and died the following day in St. Vincent's Hospital, Dublin. He was 35 years old. His funeral at Glasnevin Cemetery drew vast crowds, and his death was widely mourned on both sides of the Civil War divide. Collins, who had been his closest friend and later his political opponent, was killed three weeks later and was buried in the same cemetery.

== Early life ==
Boland was born on 27 April 1887 at 6 Dalymount Terrace, Phibsborough, Dublin, the third of five children of James Boland, a paving foreman and eventually overseer for Dublin Corporation, and Catherine ('Kate') Boland (née Woods; c.1861–1932). His father, a dedicated Fenian and GAA official and member of the Irish Republican Brotherhood (IRB), died from a brain cyst in 1895 at the age of 38, his death ascribed to a confrontation with anti-Parnellites in December 1890 over possession of the office of the United Ireland newspaper. The family was shielded from destitution by public subscriptions raised after the funeral. Kate subsequently secured a tobacconist's shop on Wexford Street, before moving to nearby Lennox Street in 1907, and north to 15 Marino Crescent in 1914.

After a turbulent period with the Christian Brothers at Synge Street CBS, Boland was accepted in about 1902 as a boarder by the De La Salle Brothers at Castletown, County Laois, with the prospect of a noviciate. Lacking both money and a vocation, he left school. He worked briefly in Manchester before becoming a tailor's cutter in Todd, Burns, & Co. of Mary Street, then one of Dublin's largest department stores.

Boland joined the IRB alongside his older brother Gerry in 1904, following in the footsteps of his father, uncle, and, probably, his grandfather. He was active in GAA circles, earning a place on the Dublin team for the All-Ireland senior hurling final in 1909, and securing his father's former post as Dublin county chairman in 1911. He also refereed the 1914 All-Ireland Senior Football Championship Final. He joined the radical Keating branch of the Gaelic League, though his Irish remained rudimentary. By November 1913, when he became a founding member of the Irish Volunteers, Boland was already an influential figure in Dublin's republican underground. He supported the Volunteers' provisional committee when it repudiated the leadership of John Redmond in October 1914, and continued to drill with F Company, 2nd Battalion, Dublin Brigade. He is said to have introduced Collins to the IRB during a visit to London in 1909.

== Irish nationalism ==
=== Easter Rising ===
Boland later joined the Irish Volunteers along with Gerry and his younger brother Ned. When John Redmond urged the Irish Volunteers to join the British army to fight in the First World War, Boland was among those who resisted. The small rump of about 8 per cent of members who remained would go on to foment the Easter Rising. Boland was a late arrival to the Rising, entering the GPO on Easter Tuesday, but he did enough to merit a ten-year prison sentence. He was court-martialled and sentenced to ten years' penal servitude, having been identified by a musketry instructor he had held in the GPO. He spent much of his imprisonment alongside Éamon de Valera at Dartmoor, Lewes, and Maidstone. Following the general amnesty of June 1917, Boland rapidly reasserted his influence in republican circles.

Both Boland and Michael Collins were elected to the executive of Sinn Féin when it was reconstituted in October 1917. Boland became a key figure in drafting propaganda, organising electoral campaigns, and maintaining morale at the Sinn Féin headquarters at 6 Harcourt St. He was also instrumental in persuading the Labour Party not to contest the 1918 general election, a move widely credited with ensuring a landslide victory for Sinn Féin.

At the 1918 general election, Boland was elected as an MP for South Roscommon, outpolling his opponent by 10,685 votes to 4,233. In line with all the Sinn Féin MPs elected at that election, he did not represent his constituents at Westminster, but withdrew to sit in the declared independent Dáil Éireann (the First Dáil). He was named by Éamon de Valera as special envoy to the United States, a role his uncle Jack had played 25 years previously. In February 1919, Boland collaborated with Collins in the rescue of de Valera from Lincoln Gaol. The operation was carried out without bloodshed and relied on improvisation and careful planning. It was widely regarded within republican circles as a significant propaganda success, as well as a practical one. As a member of Dáil Éireann, Boland supported the Irish Self-Determination League, attending its first meeting (March 1919) in Manchester.

=== In America ===
From June 1919 to December 1920, during de Valera's own time in America, Boland served as his private secretary, tour organiser, and political adviser, managing the practical and logistical demands of the visit. He also took responsibility for an ambitious arms procurement programme, working through the IRB and its American affiliates to source weapons for the Irish Volunteers. This work brought him into repeated conflict with Cathal Brugha, the minister for defence, over questions of funding and supervision, as Boland conducted these operations through the IRB rather than through official governmental channels. On the political front, Boland engaged at length with the existing Irish-American organisations, including the Friends of Irish Freedom and Clan na Gael. His efforts to bring these bodies into alignment with de Valera's Irish-centred political strategy ultimately failed. By late 1920, he had disavowed both organisations and established rival bodies under his own direction, including the American Association for the Recognition of the Irish Republic. His campaign against the influential figures of John Devoy and Daniel F. Cohalan alienated a significant portion of the established Irish-American support base. However, his organisers succeeded in mobilising large numbers of Americans, many with no Irish background, in support of the demand for self-determination.

During his tour of the United States in 1920 and early 1921, Boland delivered a series of speeches aimed at mobilising Irish-American support for the republican cause during the Anglo-Irish War. His address at Madison Square Garden in New York on 6 January 1921 became particularly prominent after he warned that, if British actions in Ireland continued, Irish people worldwide would be urged to pursue what he termed a "race vendetta", invoking the phrase "an eye for an eye and a tooth for a tooth". Variations of this statement were widely reported across American newspapers, placing his remarks at the centre of broader coverage of Irish political activity in the United States, including debates over recognition of the Irish Republic, fundraising efforts, and divisions among Irish-American organisations. The speech prompted immediate and widespread reaction in the American press and among public figures. Oswald Garrison Villard of The Nation publicly criticised the remarks in a letter to Boland, warning that any suggestion of violence in the United States would undermine support for Irish self-determination. Several newspapers published editorials condemning the rhetoric as inflammatory, while others dismissed it as exaggerated or counterproductive. Criticism also came from Irish nationalist circles in America, including John Devoy, who argued the speech was ill-judged. Boland later acknowledged in private that he had made an error and attempted to clarify or moderate his remarks in subsequent statements, although he also maintained that aspects of the speech had been misreported.

Boland also negotiated a loan of $20,000 from the Irish Republic to the Soviet Republic through the head of the Soviet Bureau, Ludwig Martens, using Russian jewellery as collateral. These jewels were transferred to Ireland on his return.

During the Irish War of Independence, Boland operated alongside Michael Collins, of whom he was a close friend. Boland also coordinated an ambitious programme for procuring arms and smuggling them to Ireland. In June 1921, his reputation as an arms procurer was damaged by the capture in Hoboken of 495 Thompson submachine guns. Boland was also a devoted follower of de Valera.

== Civil War and Death ==
Boland opposed the Anglo-Irish Treaty. He reached Dublin on 5 January 1922 in time to vote with the minority of deputies against the treaty. On 7 January 1922, just before the crucial vote, Boland addressed the assembly in opposition to the Treaty. He objected to its requirement for an oath of allegiance to King George V, which he viewed as a voluntary submission to British authority, and criticised its acceptance of partition through the exclusion of six Ulster counties from the Republic. During the debates, Boland stated: "I vote against this Treaty because I am a Republican; I was elected on the Republican ticket; I came here and took the oath to the Republican Government, and I am not going now to destroy that Government".

He subsequently worked to negotiate an electoral pact between the pro- and anti-Treaty Sinn Féin factions in advance of the 1922 general election, which he later described as his proudest achievement. In the 1922 general election, he was re-elected to the Dáil representing Mayo South–Roscommon South. In the ensuing Irish Civil War, he sided with the Anti-Treaty IRA, which brought him into open disagreement with Collins. Prior to the outbreak of violence, he said: "It's going to be war, and I'm not going to fire on Mick. So I can't fire on any of Mick's men."

Despite his efforts in the preceding months to broker a reconciliation between Collins and de Valera, he accepted a military role as quartermaster-general for the IRA's Eastern Command. In July 1922, Boland was prominent in the occupation and subsequent abandonment of Blessington, Co. Wicklow, one of the early engagements of the Civil War in the Dublin area. The anti-Treaty IRA's capacity to resist Free State forces in the region proved limited, and Blessington was given up without sustained fighting. Following this, Boland went on the run in Dublin.

Six weeks after the election, on 31 July, Boland was shot by soldiers of the National Army when they attempted to arrest him at the Skerries Grand Hotel. Two officers entered his room and Boland, who was unarmed, was shot and mortally wounded during a struggle. According to historian Andrew Brasier and John Kelly, "Reports of how and why he was shot vary and it is hard to establish an accurate historical reason, given the highly partisan views of the parties involved in the civil war conflict of brothers."

He died the following day in St. Vincent's Hospital on 1 August 1922. As he lay dying, he told his sister Kathleen that the man who had shot him was a former comrade with whom he had shared imprisonment after the Easter Rising, but refused to give the name. He was buried at Glasnevin Cemetery. The service took place from the Whitefriar Street Carmelite Church. The hearse was followed by Cumann na mBan, Clan na Gael, and the Irish Citizen Army women's section. His funeral procession attracted vast crowds. The artist Jack B. Yeats, depicting the event in two paintings, conveyed what contemporaries described as a widespread sense of public dismay.

According to historian David Fitzpatrick, Boland was "surely the most versatile of Irish revolutionaries" and that "while others specialised in fighting or speech-making, conspiracy or diplomacy, he tried his hand in every department."

== Personal life ==
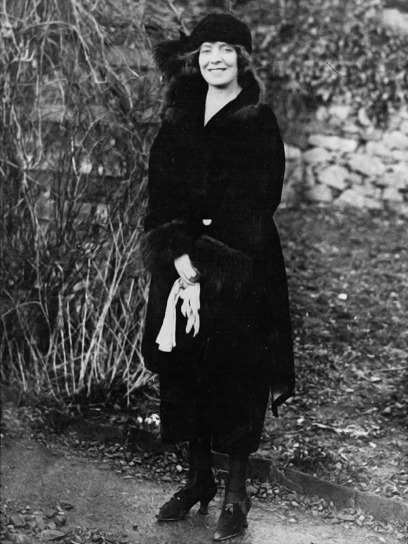
Kitty Kiernan

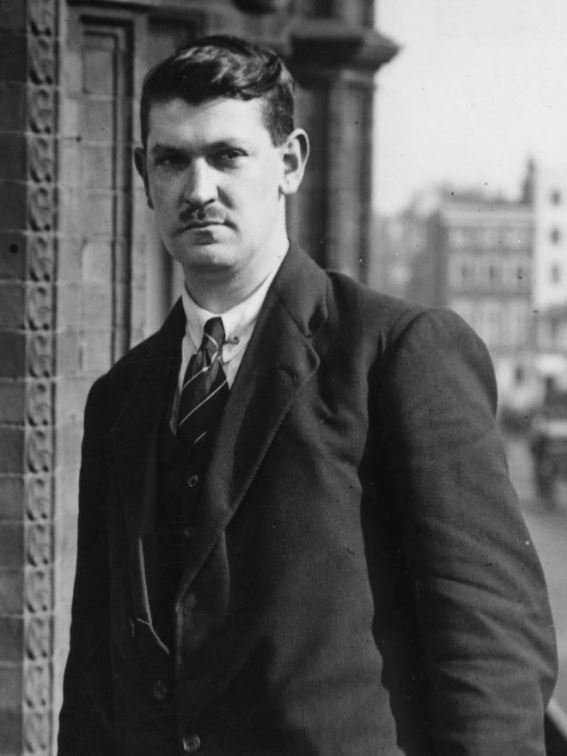
Michael Collins

Boland was known among contemporaries as a gregarious and charismatic figure, described by those who knew him as hearty, good-humoured, and socially at ease across a wide range of company. He was noted for his fashionable dress, his singing, and his storytelling. Following his release from prison in 1917, he used his standing as a freedom fighter to considerable personal effect, and was pursued by and pursued a succession of women during the years of the revolutionary period.

Circa 1917, Boland had been engaged to Ena (Christina) Shouldice, a telegraphist at the GPO in Dublin who knew the Boland family through her brothers Jack and Frank, both of whom had taken part in the 1916 Rising. In a letter dated 3 August 1917, intercepted by Dublin Castle and never delivered, Ena wrote to her brother Jim in New York describing Boland as "a bluff hearty fellow" with "a bad temper" who was "a wee bit rough," and expressed uncertainty about whether the engagement would proceed, fearing he would not always be kind or understanding. She noted that he had "rushed" her into the promise. The engagement was broken off, though the two remained on friendly terms. Ena never married and died in 1965. Her letter was discovered in 2015 at Kew Military Archives in London by her grand-nephew, journalist Frank Shouldice, while he was researching his family's role in the Easter Rising.

The most significant of Boland's romantic entanglements involved Kitty Kiernan of Granard, Co. Longford, whom both Boland and Michael Collins pursued from 1917 onwards. The rivalry over Kiernan ran alongside, and to some extent mirrored, the broader political and personal dynamic between the two men. Boland and Collins were exceptionally close during the years of the revolution, sharing fraternal bonds through the IRB, collaborating on operations including the rescue of de Valera from Lincoln Gaol in 1919, and socialising extensively while on the run. Boland is said to have introduced Collins to the IRB as early as 1909. Collins, however, generally held the upper hand in both their political and personal dealings, and during Boland's long absences in America, Collins consolidated his position within the republican movement and his relationship with Kiernan, whom he became engaged to. Kiernan chose Collins, and the romantic rivalry, combined with their opposing stances on the Anglo-Irish Treaty, permanently fractured a friendship that had been one of the closest in the revolutionary movement. Boland reportedly wrote to Kiernan proposing that they begin a new life together in the United States, but she declined.

Boland's brother, Gerald Boland, was a prominent member of Fianna Fáil and later served as Minister for Justice. His nephew, Kevin Boland, served as a Minister until he resigned in solidarity with the two ministers, Charles Haughey and Neil Blaney, who were sacked from the government in May 1970 during the Arms Crisis. Kevin Boland's resignation from Fianna Fáil and the subsequent loss of his seat marked the end of an era for the Boland political dynasty.

His nephew, Harry Boland, was a basketball player who competed in the 1948 Summer Olympics in London. He died on 18 December 2013, at the age of 88.

He also had a sister, Kathleen, who was entrusted, with her mother, with the safekeeping of jewels received from Russian diplomats as collateral for a loan made by the provisional government to the new Russian state in April 1920.

== In popular culture ==
In the 1991 TV movie The Treaty, Boland was portrayed by Malcolm Douglas.

In the 1996 film Michael Collins, Boland was portrayed by Irish-American actor Aidan Quinn. The film was criticised for fictionalising both Boland's death and aspects of Collins' life.

== See also ==
- Families in the Oireachtas

== Biographies ==
- Brasier, Andrew and Kelly, John, Harry Boland: A Man Divided, (Dublin 2000)
- Fitzpatrick, David Harry Boland's Irish Revolution, (Cork 2003)
- Maher, Jim Harry Boland: A Biography, (Cork 1998)

== Sources ==
- Ancient Order of Hibernians – Biography
- Contemporary account of Harry Boland's death – New York Times, 2 August 1922

Parliament of the United Kingdom
Preceded by John Patrick Hayden	Member of Parliament for Roscommon South; 1918–1922	Constituency abolished
Oireachtas
New constituency	Teachta Dála for Roscommon South; 1918–1921	Constituency abolished
Political offices
Preceded by Seán McGarry	President of the Irish Republican Brotherhood; 1919–1920	Succeeded by Patrick Moylett

Dáil	Election	Deputy (Party)	Deputy (Party)	Deputy (Party)	Deputy (Party)
2nd	1921	Harry Boland (SF)	Tom Maguire (SF)	Daniel O'Rourke (SF)	William Sears (SF)
3rd	1922	Harry Boland (AT-SF)	Tom Maguire (AT-SF)	Daniel O'Rourke (PT-SF)	William Sears (PT-SF)
4th	1923	Constituency abolished. See Roscommon and Mayo South			
