= Harry Boland (trade unionist) =

Australian shearer and trade unionist

Harold Boland (21 October 1891 – 25 July 1956) was an Australian shearer and trade unionist.

Boland was born near Grenfell, New South Wales to farmer Thomas Charles Edmund Boland and Elizabeth, née Tout. He did not attend school but worked in the Bogan River district as a shearer, wool-presser, sawmiller, tree-feller, fencer and miner. In 1905 he joined the Australian Workers' Union (AWU), and was later employed as a clerk in Sydney. He married Amy Forrest, a dressmaker, at the Church of Our Lady of Mount Carmel in Waterloo on 13 April 1914. An organiser for the AWU from 1920, he moved to Queensland in search of work in 1923.

In 1924 Boland was the AWU's Western District organiser, holding various positions until becoming Far Northern District secretary in 1941. He was elected Queensland president of the AWU in 1947 and Queensland president of the Australian Labor Party in 1950, joining the federal executive. Boland, who also chaired the union's newspaper the Worker, was one of six Queensland delegates to the 1955 ALP federal conference in Hobart, where he was left to represent his state alone after the other five delegates, who included Premier Vince Gair and state treasurer Ted Walsh, boycotted the conference over a dispute concerning the Victorian delegation. Boland was an opponent of the Industrial Groups and supported the conference's resolution to withdraw party support from them.

The anti-Grouper attack in Queensland was led by AWU president Joe Bukowski, allowing Boland to retain friendly relations with Gair and the others. He worked unsuccessfully to avoid the deepening divisions that in 1957 led to the formation of the Queensland Labor Party. Boland, however, did not live to see his party divide, dying in 1956 at Tingalpa of a coronary occlusion.
