= List of shipwrecks in May 1872 =

The list of shipwrecks in May 1872 includes ships sunk, foundered, grounded, or otherwise lost during May 1872.

== 1 May ==
List of shipwrecks: 1 May 1872
Ship	State	Description
Amirdavully	India	The barque was wrecked in a cyclone at Madras. Her sixteen crew were rescued.
Ardbeg	United Kingdom	The ship was driven into by a dhony in a cyclone at Madras and was severely damaged. She was then driven ashore and wrecked with the loss of eight of her twelve crew. She was on a voyage from Portsmouth, Hampshire to Madras.
Armenian	United Kingdom	The ship was driven into Hotspur (United Kingdom) and then driven ashore and wrecked in a cyclone at Madras. Her 23 crew were rescued.
Bessie Gardner	Canada	The schooner, which had been missing for some time, was discovered in a waterlogged condition by the schooner Oliver Bridges ( Canada) 150 nautical miles (280 km) off Cape Ann, Massachusetts, United States. Two dead crew members were on board.
Burlington	United Kingdom	The full-rigged ship was driven ashore and wrecked in a cyclone at Madras. Her eighteen crew were rescued.
Duprey de Lorne	France	The barque was driven out to sea in a cyclone at Madras.
Evelyn	United Kingdom	The ship was driven ashore in a cyclone at Madras. She was refloated.
Golconda	United Kingdom	The ship struck an iceberg and sank off Cape Ray, Newfoundland Colony with the loss of fifteen of her 24 crew. She was on a voyage from Liverpool, Lancashire to Quebec City, Canada.
Hotspur	United Kingdom	The full-rigged ship sank in a cyclone at Madras with the loss of five of her 35 crew. Survivors were rescued by rocket apparatus.
Hydroos	India	The barque was wrecked in a cyclone at Madras. Her 30 crew were rescued.
Hydroos	India	The brig was wrecked in a cyclone at Madras. Her fourteen crew were rescued.
Inverness-shire	United Kingdom	The ship was wrecked in a cyclone at Madras. Her twenty crew were rescued.
Jane Almond	United Kingdom	The barque was destroyed by fire at Montreal, Quebec, Canada.
Joachim Heinrich	Germany	The schooner was wrecked. She was on a voyage from the coast of Patagonia to Buenos Aires, Argentina.
John Scott	United Kingdom	The full-rigged ship was wrecked in a cyclone at Madras. Her seventeen crew were rescued.
Joy Soondaree	India	The brig was wrecked in a cyclone at Madras with the loss of two of her twenty crew.
Juggernathaprasand	India	The brig was wrecked in a cyclone at Madras. Her 22 crew were rescued.
Kingdom	Belgium	The barque was driven ashore and wrecked in a cyclone at Madras. Her sixteen crew were rescued.
Mary Le Blanc	United Kingdom	The brig was driven ashore and wrecked on Castle Island, Bermuda. She was on a voyage from Port-au-Prince, Haiti to Boston, Massachusetts, United States.
Miser	United Kingdom	The full-rigged ship was driven ashore in a cyclone at Madras. Her 40 crew were rescued.
Montezuma	France	The steamship ran aground at Havre de Grâce, Seine-Inférieure. She was on a voyage from Havre de Grâce to Brazil. She was refloated the next day.
Mootoooomarasawmy	India	The 141-ton dhony was wrecked in a cyclone at Madras with the loss of one of her fifteen crew.
Mootoooomarasawmy	India	The 183-ton dhony was wrecked in a cyclone at Madras. Her sixteen crew were rescued.
John Scott	United Kingdom	The ship was driven ashore in a cyclone at Madras.
Sir Robert Seppings	United Kingdom	The full-rigged ship was driven ashore and wrecked in a cyclone at Madras. All 400 people on board were rescued by rocket apparatus.
Stree Kristnamoorthee	India	The barque was wrecked in a cyclone at Madras. Her 36 crew were rescued.
Stree Lutchmynurstruloo	India	The dhony was wrecked in a cyclone at Madras. Her wleven crew were rescued.
Stree Nagaswernsawmy	India	The sloop was wrecked in a cyclone at Madras. Her fifteen crew were rescued.
Stree Ramooloo	India	The barque was driven ashore in a cyclone at Madras. Her 34 crew were rescued.
Stree Ramooloo	India	The dhony was wrecked in a cyclone at Madras. Her fourteen crew were rescued.
Stree Runganayakulu	India	The barque was wrecked in a cyclone at Madras. Her 31 crew were rescued.
Stree Sambrajaputtaby Ramasawmy	India	The dhony was wrecked in a cyclone at Madras. Her eighteen crew were rescued.
Stree Veerabadrasawmy	India	The barque was wrecked in a cyclone at Madras with the loss of three of her 31 crew.
Stree Veeraragavasawmy	India	The barque was wrecked in a cyclone at Madras. Her 36 crew were rescued.
Stree Vencatayswerloo	India	The 290-ton barque was wrecked in a cyclone at Madras. Her 40 crew were rescued.
Stree Vencatayswerloo	India	The 405-ton barque was wrecked in a cyclone at Madras. Her 30 crew were rescued.
Stree Vencatayswerloo	India	The schooner was wrecked in a cyclone at Madras. Her seventeen crew were rescued.
Ungalataramayswera	India	The dhony was wrecked in a cyclone at Madras. Her fifteen crew were rescued.
Unnamed	India	The dhony was driven into Ardbeg (United Kingdom) in a cyclone at Madras. She was the driven ashore and wrecked.

== 2 May ==
List of shipwrecks: 2 May 1872
Ship	State	Description
Coringa	United Kingdom	The ship sprang a leak and was abandoned in the Indian Ocean. Her crew were rescued. She was on a voyage from South Shields, County Durham to Bombay, India.
Holmside	United Kingdom	The collier collided with the collier Earl of Durham in the River Thames and was beached.
Precursor	United Kingdom	The steamship ran aground at Malta. She was refloated.

== 3 May ==
List of shipwrecks: 3 May 1872
Ship	State	Description
Flora	Norway	The brig was wrecked on Bonaire. She was on a voyage from Saint Thomas, Virgin Islands to Curaçao, Curaçao and Dependencies.
Noor Jehan	United Kingdom	The barque collided with the full-rigged ship Carin (United Kingdom) and sank in the English Channel between Portland, Dorset and Start Point, Devon. Her crew were rescued by Carin. Noor Jehan was on a voyage from Sunderland, County Durham to Fiume, Austria-Hungary.
Prima Donna	United Kingdom	The ship was wrecked near Løkken-Vrå, Denmark. Her crew were rescued.
Richard Roper	United Kingdom	The schooner was driven ashore in Ballochney Bay. Her crew were rescued.
Saint Martin	Belgium	The fishing smack was driven ashore and wrecked at Wick, Caithness, United Kingdom. Her eight crew were rescued by a coble.
Scud	United Kingdom	The lugger struck the Spanish Ledges, off St Mary's, Isles of Scilly, and sank. Her crew were rescued.
Thomas	United Kingdom	The ship was driven ashore at Moville, County Donegal.

== 4 May ==
List of shipwrecks: 4 May 1872
Ship	State	Description
Christina	United Kingdom	The sloop was driven ashore on Inishbofin, County Donegal.
Darien	United Kingdom	The steamship ran aground in the Savannah River, She was on a voyage from Savannah, Georgia, United States to Liverpool, Lancashire.
Etoile	France	The brig was wrecked at "Ludmore Point", Isle of Wight, United Kingdom. Her eight crew were rescued by the lifeboat Rescue ( Royal National Lifeboat Institution). Etoile was on a voyage from Saint-Malo, Ille-et-Vilaine to Riga, Russia.
Georgiana	United Kingdom	The ship was driven ashore north of Maryport, Cumberland. She was refloated on 6 May and taken in to Maryport.
John and Mary	United Kingdom	The schooner struck rocks off St Patrick's Island, County Dublin and sank. Her crew were rescued. She was on a voyage from Liverpool, Lancashire to Dublin.
Marie Louise	France	The ship ran aground on the Hook Sand, in the Solent. She was on a voyage from Saint-Malo, Ille-et-Vilaine to Southampton, Hampshire, United Kingdom.
Sherlock	United Kingdom	The brig foundered in the North Sea 47 nautical miles (87 km) off Texel, North Holland, Netherlands. Her crew were rescued. She was on a voyage from Sunderland, County Durham to the Nieuwe Diep.

== 5 May ==
List of shipwrecks: 5 May 1872
Ship	State	Description
Eva	United Kingdom	The schooner was wrecked on Rockabill Island, County Dublin. Her crew were rescued.
Lydie and Azeline	Sweden	The ship was driven ashore and wrecked at Agger, Denmark. She was on a voyage from Charlestown, Cornwall, United Kingdom to Stockholm.
Mina	United Kingdom	The schooner was driven ashore on "Refi Bragen", Denmark. Her crew were rescued by the Thisted Lifeboat. Mina was on a voyage from Clackmannan to Gothenburg, Sweden. She was refloated with the assistance of the steamship Aleandra (United Kingdom) and towed in to Kristiansand, Norway.
Royal Victoria	United Kingdom	The schooner collided with the steamship Annalong (United Kingdom) and was beached in the Belfast Lough near Carrickfergus, County Antrim. Her four crew were rescued the next day by the Coastguard.
Tadmor	United Kingdom	The ship was driven ashore and wrecked on Anticosti Island, Nova Scotia, Canada. She was on a voyage from Grangemouth, Stirlingshire to Quebec City, Canada.

== 6 May ==
List of shipwrecks: 6 May 1872
Ship	State	Description
Castle Eden	(United Kingdom of Great Britain and Ireland) Burma	The ship sank at Rangoon.
Hugh M. Griffie	United Kingdom	The ship was driven ashore and wrecked at Pullaheeney, County Sligo.

== 7 May ==
List of shipwrecks: 7 May 1872
Ship	State	Description
Gem	United Kingdom	The schooner struck the quayside at Havre de Grâce, Seine-Inférieure, France and sank. She was on a voyage from Charlestown, Cornwall to Rouen, Seine-Inférieure. She was refloated on 27 May.
Jean Baptiste	France	The ship was driven ashore. She was on a voyage from Seaham, County Durham, United Kingdom to Saint-Valery-sur-Somme, Somme. She was refloated and taken in to Lowestoft, Suffolk, United Kingdom.
Lake Huron	Canada	The clipper was driven ashore by ice and wrecked on Anticosti Island, Nova Scotia. She was on a voyage from Montreal, Quebec to Liverpool, Lancashire, United Kingdom.
L. H. de Weber	United States	The ship was driven ashore at "Castlehill". She was on a voyage from Ardrossan, Ayrshire, United Kingdom to Providence, Rhode Island. She was refloated.
Ostrich	United Kingdom	The ship collided with Betsy (United Kingdom) and sank off Lundy Island, Devon. Her crew were rescued by Betsy.

== 8 May ==
List of shipwrecks: 8 May 1872
Ship	State	Description
Thames	United Kingdom	The steamship caught fire at West Hartlepool, County Durham. The fire was extinguished with the assistance of the tug John Bull (United Kingdom).
Unnamed	United Kingdom	The schooner ran aground on the East Hoyle Bank, in Liverpool Bay.

== 9 May ==
List of shipwrecks: 9 May 1872
Ship	State	Description
Rhodes	United Kingdom	The schooner collided with the steamship Mark Anthony (United Kingdom) and sank in the River Thames at Northfleet, Kent. Her crew were rescued.

== 10 May ==
List of shipwrecks: 10 May 1872
Ship	State	Description
Rival	United States	The ship was sighted in the Atlantic Ocean (28°14′S 43°35′E) whilst on a voyage from Rangoon, Burma to Falmouth, Cornwall, United Kingdom. No further trace, presumed foundered with the loss of all hands, more than 22 people.
Thomas Adams	United Kingdom	The steamship ran aground at Dundee, Forfarshire. She was on a voyage from South Shields, County Durham to Dundee.
Wanderer	United States	The brig was wrecked in the "Levianski Islands". Her crew were rescued by Moorburg (United States). Wanderer was on a voyage from San Francisco, California to Nicholaieff, Russia.

== 11 May ==
List of shipwrecks: 11 May 1872
Ship	State	Description
Minnie	United Kingdom	The yacht capsized and sank in the River Thames at Grays Thurrock, Essex with the loss of one of the three people on board.
Norwich	United Kingdom	The steamship foundered at sea. Her crew were rescued. She was on a voyage from Liverpool, Lancashire to Lagos.
St. Patrick	United Kingdom	The steamship sank at Montreal, Quebec, Canada. She was refloated the next day.

== 12 May ==
List of shipwrecks: 12 May 1872
Ship	State	Description
Elizabeth and Ann	United Kingdom	The sloop was run into by the steamship Dodo (United Kingdom and sank at Cork. Her crew were rescued.
Nooit Gedacht	Netherlands	The ship collided with the steamship Pascal (United Kingdom) and sank in the Scheldt. Her crew were rescued.

== 13 May ==
List of shipwrecks: 13 May 1872
Ship	State	Description
Little Dorritt	United Kingdom	The yacht was wrecked on the Dogger Bank, in the Irish Sea off the coast of County Wexford. Both crew were rescued by the Wexford Lifeboat. She was on a voyage from Greenock, Renfrewshire to Weymouth, Dorset.
Impulse	United Kingdom	The ship was wrecked at Ochre Pit Point, Newfoundland Colony. She was on a voyage from Liverpool, Lancashire to Harbour Grace, Newfoundland Colony.
Lizzie Tivin	United Kingdom	The smack ran aground on the Goodwin Sands, Kent and sank. Her crew were rescued. She was on a voyage from Dartmouth, Devon to Hull, Yorkshire. She was later refloated and taken in the River Thames.
Staffa	United Kingdom	The steamship ran aground on the Shipwash Sand, in the North Sea off the coast of Suffolk and was damaged. She was on a voyage from Hull, Yorkshire to Constantinople, Ottoman Empire and Odesa, Russia. She was refloated and taken in to Harwich, Essex.
Uncle Tom	United Kingdom	The Mersey Flat ran aground on the East Hoyle Sandbank, in Liverpool Bay and sank. Her crew were rescued. She was on a voyage from Garston, Lancashire to Caernarfon.
Unnamed	Italy	The brig collided with a Greek brig and sank in the Mediterranean Sea 10 nautical miles (19 km) off Carloforte, Sardinia. Her crew were rescued by the Greek vessel.

== 14 May ==
List of shipwrecks: 14 May 1872
Ship	State	Description
Alumina	United Kingdom	The barque was driven ashore at Saint John, New Brunswick, Canada. She was on a voyage from Saint John to Liverpool, Lancashire. She was refloated but was consequently condemned.
Maria Francisco	Italy	The barque ran aground at Gibraltar. She was on a voyage from Odesa, Russia to Cork, United Kingdom. She was refloated and taken in to Gibraltar in a leaky condition.
Try	United Kingdom	The trow sank at Cardiff, Glamorgan.

== 15 May ==
List of shipwrecks: 15 May 1872
Ship	State	Description
Frithiof	Norway	The barque ran aground at Gilleleje, Denmark. She was on a voyage from Hartlepool, County Durham, United Kingdom to Stockholm, Sweden. She was refloated, but ran aground off "Spodsbjerg". She was refloated and taken in to Helsingør, Denmark in a leaky condition.
Isabelle	France	The schooner collided with the steamship West (United Kingdom) and was abandoned in the English Channel. All on board were rescued by West. Isabelle was on a voyage from the Charente to Rouen, Seine-Inférieure.

== 17 May ==
List of shipwrecks: 17 May 1872
Ship	State	Description
Andrew Johnson	United Kingdom	The ship ran aground on the Sudpill, in the Elbe. She was on a voyage from the Guañape Islands, Peru to Hamburg, Germany.
Tripoli	United Kingdom	The steamship ran aground on the Tuskar Rock and was wrecked. All 200 passengers were rescued. by the schooners Naiad and Spencer and the steamships Halcyon and Toward (all United Kingdom). Her 80 crew were taken off the next day by a tug. Tripoli was on a voyage from Liverpool, Lancashire to Boston, Massachusetts, United States.

== 18 May ==
List of shipwrecks: 18 May 1872
Ship	State	Description
Rosevean	United Kingdom	The schooner ran aground and capsized in the River Parrett. She was on a voyage from Ballinacurra, County Cork to Bridgwater, Somerset. She was righted.
Unnamed	Germany	The ship foundered in the Atlantic Ocean (30°15′N 19°16′W). Her crew were rescued by Ocean Bell (United Kingdom). The ship was on a voyage from Hamburg to the Peter the Great Gulf.

== 21 May ==
List of shipwrecks: 21 May 1872
Ship	State	Description
Minerva	Norway	The ship was driven ashore on Heligoland. She was on a voyage from Hamburg, Germany to New York, United States. She was refloated and put back to Cuxhaven, Germany in a leaky condition.

== 22 May ==
List of shipwrecks: 22 May 1872
Ship	State	Description
Natalia	United Kingdom	The ship ran aground on Anticosti Island, Nova Scotia, Canada. She was on a voyage from North Shields, Northumberland to Quebec City, Canada. She was refloated and resumed her voyage.

== 23 May ==
List of shipwrecks: 23 May 1872
Ship	State	Description
Baltimore, and Lorenzo Semprun	Germany; Spain	The steamship Baltimore collided with the steamship Lorenzo Semprun in the English Channel 12 nautical miles (22 km) off Hastings, Sussex, United Kingdom and was consequently beached at Hastings. All on board, 110 passengers plus her crew, were rescued by the Coastguard and the Hastings Lifeboat. Baltimore was on a voyage from Baltimore, Maryland, United States to Hamburg. She was refloated the next day and taken in to Southampton, Hampshire, United Kingdom. She was subsequently repaired at Bremen. Lorenzo Semprun was on a voyage from Ålesund, Norway to Santander. She put in to Southampton in a severely damaged condition.
Oracle	United Kingdom	The steamship ran aground and sank in Vefsnfjord. Her crew survived. She was on a voyage from London to Vefsn, Norway.
Violet	United Kingdom	The ship foundered in the Atlantic Ocean off Rio de Janeiro, Brazil. Her crew were rescued. She was on a voyage from Liverpool to Rio de Janeiro.

== 24 May ==
List of shipwrecks: 24 May 1872
Ship	State	Description
Bentinck	United Kingdom	The barque was wrecked on the west coast of Africa between Lagos and Accra, Gold Coast. Her crew survived the wreck, but were attacked by the local inhabitants.
Bessie Rodgers	United Kingdom	The barque ran aground at Waterford. She was refloated.
Coila	United Kingdom	The schooner was driven ashore south of Kronstadt, Russia. She was refloated on 27 May.
Fitzpatrick	United Kingdom	The steamship ran aground on the Platters, off Holyhead, Anglesey.
Thais	United Kingdom	The steamship ran aground on the East Hoyle Bank, in Liverpool Bay. She was on a voyage from Mostyn, Flintshire to Liverpool, Lancashire. She was refloated and taken in to Liverpool.
Four unnamed vessels	United Kingdom	The ships were driven ashore and wrecked between Lagos and Accra.

== 25 May ==
List of shipwrecks: 25 May 1872
Ship	State	Description
Evadne	United Kingdom	The barque was holed by ice and sank 10 nautical miles (19 km) north of St. Paul Island, Nova Scotia, Canada. Her crew survived.
George	United Kingdom	The ship ran aground on the Mittelplatt, in the North Sea. She was on a voyage from West Hartlepool, County Durham to Geestemünde, Germany. She was refloated and completed her voyage.
Halcyon	United Kingdom	The steamship was wrecked on the North Chicken Rock, off the Tuskar Rock. All on board were rescued by the steamship Ruby (United Kingdom). Halcyon was on a voyage from Liverpool to New York.
Josephine	United States	The schooner sprung a leak and sunk off Portland, Maine crew saved.
Lady Cecilia	United Kingdom	The brig was driven ashore on Skagen, Denmark. She was on a voyage from South Shields, County Durham to Kronstadt, Russia.
Victoria	United Kingdom	The ship was holed by ice and sank 10 nautical miles (19 km) north of St. Paul Island. Her crew survived.

== 26 May ==
List of shipwrecks: 26 May 1872
Ship	State	Description
Elaine	United Kingdom	The ship was driven ashore and wrecked at East London, Cape Colony.
Emma	United Kingdom	The ship was driven ashore and wrecked at East London.
Martha	United Kingdom	The ship was driven ashore and wrecked at the mouth of the Buffalo River.
Quanza	United Kingdom	The steamship was driven ashore and wrecked at the mouth of the Buffalo River, Cape Colony.
Refuge	United Kingdom	The barque was driven ashore and wrecked at the mouth of the Buffalo River.
Shark	United Kingdom	The ship was driven ashore and wrecked at the mouht of the Buffalo River.

== 27 May ==
List of shipwrecks: 27 May 1872
Ship	State	Description
Queen of May	United Kingdom	The ship was driven ashore and wrecked at East London.
Stella	United Kingdom	The schooner was driven ashore and wrecked at Port Beaufort, Cape Colony.

== 28 May ==
List of shipwrecks: 28 May 1872
Ship	State	Description
Erimus	Netherlands	The steamship ran aground off Brielle, South Holland.
Jane Davie	United Kingdom	The ship was driven ashore and wrecked east of East London, Cape Colony with the loss of a crew member. Survivors were rescued by the steamship Bismarck (Germany) and the East London Lifeboat. Jane Davie was on a voyage from Rangoon, Burma to Liverpool, Lancashire.
Phoenix	(Canada)	The steamship was destroyed by fire near Trois-Rivières, Quebec with the loss of a crew member.

== 29 May ==
List of shipwrecks: 29 May 1872
Ship	State	Description
Ant	United Kingdom	The ship was destroyed by fire at Gatehouse of Fleet, Wigtownshire. She was on a voyage from Whitehaven, Cumberland to Gatehouse of Fleet.
Dalton	United Kingdom	The ship was driven ashore and wrecked on Walney Island, Lancashire. She was on a voyage from Ramsey, Isle of Man to Barrow-in-Furness, Lancashire.
Emperor	Canada	While steaming at night in fog during a voyage from Yarmouth, Nova Scotia to Portland, Maine, United States with about 80 passengers and crew aboard, the 175-foot (53 m), 600-gross register ton sidewheel paddle steamer struck Eastern Ledge, a reef off Seal Island in Penobscot Bay on the evening of 28 May. She rolled over and sank without loss of life at 43°53′38″N 068°43′45″W early on 29 May.
Endeavour	United Kingdom	The tug suffered a boiler explosion and sank in the English Channel off Eastbourne, Sussex. Her crew survived.
Rover	(United Kingdom of Great Britain and Ireland) Isle of Man	The dandy rigged lugger collided with the lugger Chief Templar ( (United Kingdom of Great Britain and Ireland) Isle of Man) and sank in the Irish Sea 30 nautical miles (56 km) south west of the Old Head of Kinsale, County Cork. Her crew were rescued by Chief Templar.
Thames	United Kingdom	The ship was driven ashore and wrecked on Alderney, Channel Islands. She was on a voyage from South Shields, County Durham to Adra, Spain.
Ysusguiza	India	The barque ran aground at Chittagong and became hogged.

== 30 May ==
List of shipwrecks: 30 May 1872
Ship	State	Description
Caledonia	New Zealand	The 60-ton schooner was dashed on rocks at the mouth of the Catlins River.
Nicolas Etienne Jenne	France	The ship was wrecked at "Kootana", Africa.
Paul	France	The ship was wrecked at "Leckie", Africa.
San Antonio	Flag unknown	The ship was towed in to Gibraltar in a derelict condition. She had been on a voyage from Gallipoli, Ottoman Empire to Saint Petersburg, Russia.

== 31 May ==
List of shipwrecks: 31 May 1872
Ship	State	Description
Counsellor	United Kingdom	The steamship ran aground in the Danube at Gorgova, Ottoman Empire.
Esk	United Kingdom	The steamship ran aground in the Danube at Gorgova.
Holly Bough	United Kingdom	The ship was driven ashore at Berdyanski, Russia. She was refloated and repaired.
York	United Kingdom	The steamship ran aground in the Danube at Gorgova.
Young Australia	United Kingdom	The clipper was wrecked on Moreton Island, Queensland. She was on a voyage from Brisbane, Queensland to Liverpool, Lancashire.

== Unknown date ==
List of shipwrecks: Unknown date in May 1872
Ship	State	Description
Alma, and Siam	French Navy; Sweden	The barque Siam collided with the Alma-class ironclad Alma at Wusong, China and sank. She was on a voyage from Nagasaki, Japan to Wusong. Alma was consequently beached.
Alpha	Norway	The ship was wrecked on Grand Cay, Bahamas. Her crew were rescued.
Anna Margaretha	United Kingdom	The ship was driven ashore on Læsø, Denmark. She was on a voyage from Newcastle upon Tyne, Northumberland to Saint Petersburg, Russia. She was refloated and taken in to Fredrikshavn, Denmark, where she sprang a leak.
Antonia	Italy	The brig ran aground. She was on a voyage from Gallipoli, Ottoman Empire to Saint Petersburg. She was refloated and towed in to Gibraltar.
Aruim	Norway	The ship was driven ashore at Cape Tormentine, New Brunswick, Canada. She was on a voyage from Larvik to Quebec City, Canada.
A. W. Hutchings	United Kingdom	The ship struck the Brockbank and sank. She was on a voyage from Middlesbrough, Yorkshire to Calais, France.
Bertha Angele	France	The ship was abandoned at sea. She was on a voyage from the Île de Ré, Charente-Inférieure to Miquelon.
Berwick	United Kingdom	The ship was wrecked on the Quitasneno Reefs. She was on a voyage from Aspinwall, United States of Colombia to Cienfuegos, Cuba.
B. P. King	(Canada)	The ship was wrecked in the Turks Islands. She was on a voyage from Saint John, New Brunswick to St. Jago de Cuba, Cuba.
Burnett	United Kingdom	The ship was driven ashore at Honfleur, Manche, France.
Calabar	United Kingdom	The ship was abandoned at sea. She was on a voyage from a port in Central America to Queenstown, County Cork.
Cambrian	United Kingdom	The steamship was driven ashore on Prince Edward Island, Canada.
Chance	United Kingdom	The ship foundered at sea. She was on a voyage from Jersey, Channel Islands to Gaspé, Quebec, Canada.
Clara Sayers	New South Wales	The ship was wrecked on a reef off Rodrigues. She was on a voyage from Newcastle to Mauritius.
Cornelia	United Kingdom	The ship was sunk by ice. Her crew survived. She was on a voyage from Grimsby, Lincolnshire to Quebec City.
Dumfries	United Kingdom	The ship capsized off the Carsethorn Lighthouse, Wigtownshire. She was righted with assistance.
Ellen Bernard	United States	The ship was wrecked off Grand Bahama, Bahamas. She was on a voyage from Cienfuegos to New York.
Emma	Canada	The schooner collided with the tug Goliah ( Canada) and sank near Halifax, Nova Scotia.
F. Pirandello	United States	The ship ran aground on the Sisters and was severely damaged. She was refloated.
Freitas Irmaos	Portugal	The ship ran aground on the Sisters and was severely damaged. She was on a voyage from Lisbon to Halifax.
Grace Sargeant	United Kingdom	The ship foundered in the Pacific Ocean before 25 May. Her crew were rescued.
Halcyon	United Kingdom	The ship was wrecked in the Magdalen Islands, Nova Scotia. She was on a voyage from Quebec City, Canada to Stockton-on-Tees, County Durham.
Halcyon	United Kingdom	The ship was driven ashore at Portrush, County Antrim. She was on a voyage from Londonderry to Portrush.
Isabel	United Kingdom	The ship ran aground on the Brake Sand. She was on a voyage from London to Dublin. She was refloated and taken in to The Downs.
Katiagnes	United States	The ship was driven ashore on Fisherman Island Maine. She was on a voyage from New York to Saint John's, Newfoundland Colony.
Lady Westmoreland	United Kingdom	The barque ran aground on the White Island Reef and was severely damaged. She was on a voyage from South Shields, County Durham to Quebec City. She was consequently condemned.
Laquilla	United States	The steamship was abandoned in the Atlantic Ocean before 7 May.
Laura	Portugal	The ship foundered off Cádiz, Spain. She was on a voyage from Bahia, Brazil to Porto.
Lord Clyde	(Dominion of Newfoundland) Newfoundland Colony	The ship was sunk by ice at Battle Harbour.
Lorton	Spain	The barque was wrecked in the "Goulos Islands", Spanish East Indies. Her crew survived. She was on a voyage from London to Yokohama, Japan.
Lucia	United Kingdom	The ship was driven ashore at Holyhead, Anglesey. She was on a voyage from Liverpool to Swansea, Glamorgan.
Margareta	Netherlands	The ship foundered at sea. Her crew were rescued. She was on a voyage from Goeree, Zeeland to Marseille, Bouches-du-Rhône, France.
Martha	Norway	The ship foundered near Pondicherry, India. Her crew were rescued on 5 May by Marthe (Flag unknown).
Mary Blane	United States	The ship was wrecked off Castle Island, Bermuda. She was on a voyage from Port-au-Prince, Haita to Boston, Massachusetts.
Monticello	United States	The sealer was abandoned in the Atlantic Ocean. Her crew were rescued by the brigantine Louise (France).
Norwa	China	The steamship struck a submerged object and was beached at Cutter Place. She was pon a voyage from Swatow to Shanghai.
Ornen	United Kingdom	The ship was driven ashore at Cape Tormentine. She was on a voyage from Halifax to Miramichi, New Brunswick.
Perseverance	United Kingdom	The ship collided with the steamship Eclair (United Kingdom) and sank.
Peter	United Kingdom	The Mersey Flat ran aground on the West Hoyle Bank, in Liverpool Bay.
Retreiver	(Dominion of Newfoundland) Newfoundland Colony	The sealer, a steamship, was sunk by ice at Battle Harbour.
Rhea Sylvia	United States	The ship ran aground on the Mucates Reefs. She was on a voyage from New York to Havana, Cuba.
Rientje	Netherlands	The schooner ran aground at Narva, Russia. Her crew were rescued.
Sandbach	United Kingdom	The ship was severely damaged at Demerara, British Guiana.
Sparkling Wave	United Kingdom	The ship was driven ashore by ice in the Dwina.
St. Paul's	Flag unknown	The ship was wrecked at Whitehead, Nova Scotia. She was on a voyage from New York to Quebec City.
Valparaíso	Chile	The steamship ran aground in the Chaco Narrows before 18 May. She broke in two and sank during salvage efforts.
Viking	(United Kingdom of Great Britain and Ireland) British Guiana	The schooner sank near Albion.
Wasp	United Kingdom	The ship was wrecked in the Magdalen Islands. She was on a voyage from Montreal to Antwerp, Belgium.
Unnamed	Russia	The lighter ran aground at Narva. Her crew were rescued.
