= Joseph O'Connor (disambiguation) =

Joseph O'Connor is an Irish author and journalist.

Joseph or Joe O'Connor may also refer to:

== Sportspeople ==
- Joe O'Connor (Gaelic footballer), Kerry player
- Joe O'Connor (Limerick hurler) (born 1967), Limerick player
- Joe O'Connor (Wexford hurler) (born 1997), Irish hurler
- Joseph O'Connor (rower), American rowing cox at the 1976 World Rowing Championships
- Joe O'Connor (snooker player) (born 1995), English snooker player
- Joseph O'Connor (water polo) (1904–1982), Irish Olympic water polo player
- Joe O'Connor (referee) (1892–1961), American boxing referee and government official for the city of Boston

== Politicians ==
- Joseph O'Connor (Australian politician) (1839–1913), New South Wales politician
- Joseph O'Connor (Irish politician) (1880–1941), Irish politician and farmer

== Others ==
- Joseph Desmond O'Connor (1919–1998), British linguist and professor of phonetics
- Joe O'Connor (actor), American actor
- Joseph O'Connor (Irish republican), (c.1880–1959), Irish republican and soldier

== See also ==
- Joseph O'Conor (1916–2001), Anglo-Irish actor and playwright
