= Rockabill Lighthouse =

Rockabill
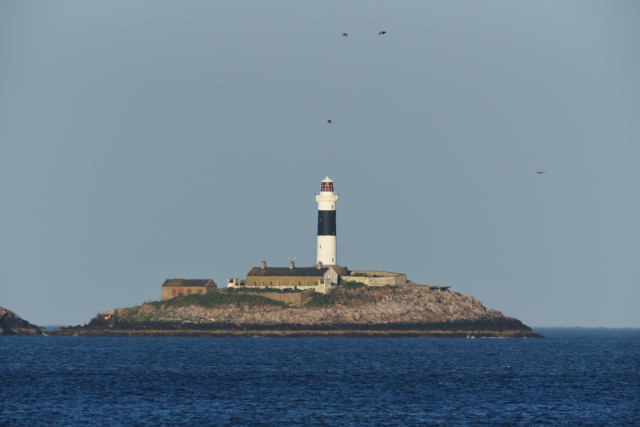
- Rockabill in 2020
- Location: East-north-east of Skerries, County Dublin, Ireland
- Coordinates: 53°35′49.1″N 6°00′15.8″W

Tower
- Constructed: 1855–1860
- Construction: granite and limestone tower
- Automated: 1989
- Height: 32 metres (105 ft)
- Shape: cylindrical tower with gallery and lantern
- Markings: white tower with one broad black horizontal band
- Fog signal: (4) 60s

Light
- First lit: 1860
- Focal height: 45 metres (148 ft)
- Range: 17 nmi (31 km; 20 mi) (white), 13 nmi (24 km; 15 mi) (red)
- Characteristic: Fl WR 12s
- Ireland no.: CIL-0960

Rockabill Lighthouse is an active lighthouse from the 19th century on the larger of the two islands that form Rockabill. It lies around 5 kilometres (3.1 mi) off of the east coast of Skerries, County Dublin, Ireland. It is maintained by the Commissioners of Irish Lights.

== History ==
In 1837, the Drogheda Harbour Commissioners proposed a lighthouse be built on Rockabill, with the costs to be paid by tolls on shipping in the harbour. In 1838, Trinity House, then the official authority on lighthouses in Ireland, declined the request.

In 1853, the Trinity Board, under the supervision of William and James Burgess, brothers from Limerick, reversed the decision and authorized the construction of the lighthouse. Construction began in 1855 and continued through 1860, using granite from the Mourne Mountains in County Down and limestone from Milverton. The total cost of construction was £13,248. The lighthouse began operation on 1 July 1860.

The focal plane of the lantern is 45 metres (148 ft) above sea level. The lighthouse tower is made of granite and is 32 metres (105 ft) high, including the gallery and lantern. The light tower is painted white with one broad, black, horizontal band.

In 1918, the station was equipped with a foghorn, which emits four blasts every minute. A keeper's residence and other buildings are located at the station, which is currently operated by the Commissioners of Irish Lights. The lighthouse became automated in March 1989.
