= Jim Glennon =

Irish former politician and rugby union footballer (born 1953)

Teachta Dála
- In office May 2002 – May 2007
- Constituency: Dublin North

Senator
- In office 2 June 2000 – 17 May 2002
- Constituency: Industrial and Commercial Panel

Personal details
- Born: 7 July 1953 (age 72) Skerries, County Dublin, Ireland
- Party: Fianna Fáil
- Relatives: Gerrard McGowan (uncle)

James Glennon (born 7 July 1953) is an Irish former Fianna Fáil politician and former Irish International rugby player. He was a Teachta Dála for Dublin North from 2002 to 2007.

Glennon was born in Skerries, County Dublin in 1953. He was educated at Mount St. Joseph's school in Roscrea, County Tipperary. A former rugby union international he was capped six times for Ireland as a second row forward. He is a former coach and manager to the Leinster senior team and is also a former manager to the Ireland under 19 and Ireland under 21 teams. His uncle Gerrard McGowan was a Labour Party TD in the 1930s.

Glennon was elected to the 21st Seanad in a Seanad by-election on the Industrial and Commercial Panel in June 2000. He served in Seanad Éireann until he was elected to the 29th Dáil for Dublin North at the 2002 general election. Glennon was vice-chairman of the Oireachtas Committee on Arts, Sport, Tourism, Community, Rural and Gaeltacht Affairs from 2002 to 2007. He was also a member of the Oireachtas Transport Committee and of the Oireachtas Committee on Procedures and Privileges. Glennon chaired a session of the Dublin Forum – a Fianna Fáil project to allow Dublin residents discuss issues of political significance. He was part of the TV3 Rugby World Cup coverage in 2007.

In October 2006, Glennon surprisingly announced that he would not be standing at the 2007 general election.

In April 2026, Glennon apologised for providing a positive character reference for a convicted child sexual abuser, Daniel Ramamoorthy, when such child abuser appealed the severity of his sentence. He apologised for being 'naive' in choosing to support the appeal.

Dáil	Election	Deputy (Party)	Deputy (Party)	Deputy (Party)	Deputy (Party)	Deputy (Party)	Deputy (Party)	Deputy (Party)	Deputy (Party)
4th	1923	Alfie Byrne (Ind.)	Francis Cahill (CnaG)	Margaret Collins-O'Driscoll (CnaG)	Seán McGarry (CnaG)	William Hewat (BP)	Richard Mulcahy (CnaG)	Seán T. O'Kelly (Rep)	Ernie O'Malley (Rep)
4th	1925 by-election	Alfie Byrne (Ind.)	Patrick Leonard (CnaG)	Margaret Collins-O'Driscoll (CnaG)	Oscar Traynor (Rep)	William Hewat (BP)	Richard Mulcahy (CnaG)	Seán T. O'Kelly (Rep)	Ernie O'Malley (Rep)
5th	1927 (Jun)	Alfie Byrne (Ind.)	John Byrne (CnaG)	Margaret Collins-O'Driscoll (CnaG)	Oscar Traynor (SF)	Denis Cullen (Lab)	Richard Mulcahy (CnaG)	Seán T. O'Kelly (FF)	Kathleen Clarke (FF)
6th	1927 (Sep)	Alfie Byrne (Ind.)	John Byrne (CnaG)	Margaret Collins-O'Driscoll (CnaG)	Patrick Leonard (CnaG)	James Larkin (IWL)	Richard Mulcahy (CnaG)	Seán T. O'Kelly (FF)	Eamonn Cooney (FF)
6th	1928 by-election	Alfie Byrne (Ind.)	John Byrne (CnaG)	Margaret Collins-O'Driscoll (CnaG)	Patrick Leonard (CnaG)	Vincent Rice (CnaG)	Richard Mulcahy (CnaG)	Seán T. O'Kelly (FF)	Eamonn Cooney (FF)
6th	1929 by-election	Thomas F. O'Higgins (CnaG)	John Byrne (CnaG)	Margaret Collins-O'Driscoll (CnaG)	Patrick Leonard (CnaG)	Vincent Rice (CnaG)	Richard Mulcahy (CnaG)	Seán T. O'Kelly (FF)	Eamonn Cooney (FF)
7th	1932	Alfie Byrne (Ind.)	John Byrne (CnaG)	Margaret Collins-O'Driscoll (CnaG)	Oscar Traynor (FF)	Cormac Breathnach (FF)	Richard Mulcahy (CnaG)	Seán T. O'Kelly (FF)	Eamonn Cooney (FF)
8th	1933	Alfie Byrne (Ind.)	Patrick Belton (CnaG)	Vincent Rice (CnaG)	Oscar Traynor (FF)	Cormac Breathnach (FF)	Richard Mulcahy (CnaG)	Seán T. O'Kelly (FF)	Eamonn Cooney (FF)
9th	1937	Constituency abolished. See Dublin North-East and Dublin North-West							

Dáil	Election	Deputy (Party)	Deputy (Party)	Deputy (Party)	Deputy (Party)
22nd	1981	Ray Burke (FF)	John Boland (FG)	Nora Owen (FG)	3 seats 1981–1992
23rd	1982 (Feb)	Ray Burke (FF)	John Boland (FG)	Nora Owen (FG)	3 seats 1981–1992
24th	1982 (Nov)	Ray Burke (FF)	John Boland (FG)	Nora Owen (FG)	3 seats 1981–1992
25th	1987	Ray Burke (FF)	John Boland (FG)	G. V. Wright (FF)	3 seats 1981–1992
26th	1989	Ray Burke (FF)	Nora Owen (FG)	Seán Ryan (Lab)	3 seats 1981–1992
27th	1992	Ray Burke (FF)	Nora Owen (FG)	Seán Ryan (Lab)	Trevor Sargent (GP)
28th	1997	Ray Burke (FF)	Nora Owen (FG)	G. V. Wright (FF)	Trevor Sargent (GP)
28th	1998 by-election	Seán Ryan (Lab)	Nora Owen (FG)	G. V. Wright (FF)	Trevor Sargent (GP)
29th	2002	Seán Ryan (Lab)	Jim Glennon (FF)	G. V. Wright (FF)	Trevor Sargent (GP)
30th	2007	James Reilly (FG)	Michael Kennedy (FF)	Darragh O'Brien (FF)	Trevor Sargent (GP)
31st	2011	James Reilly (FG)	Alan Farrell (FG)	Brendan Ryan (Lab)	Clare Daly (SP)
32nd	2016	Constituency abolished. See Dublin Fingal			
