= Thomas Hand (Irish republican) =

Irish Republican (1878-1920)

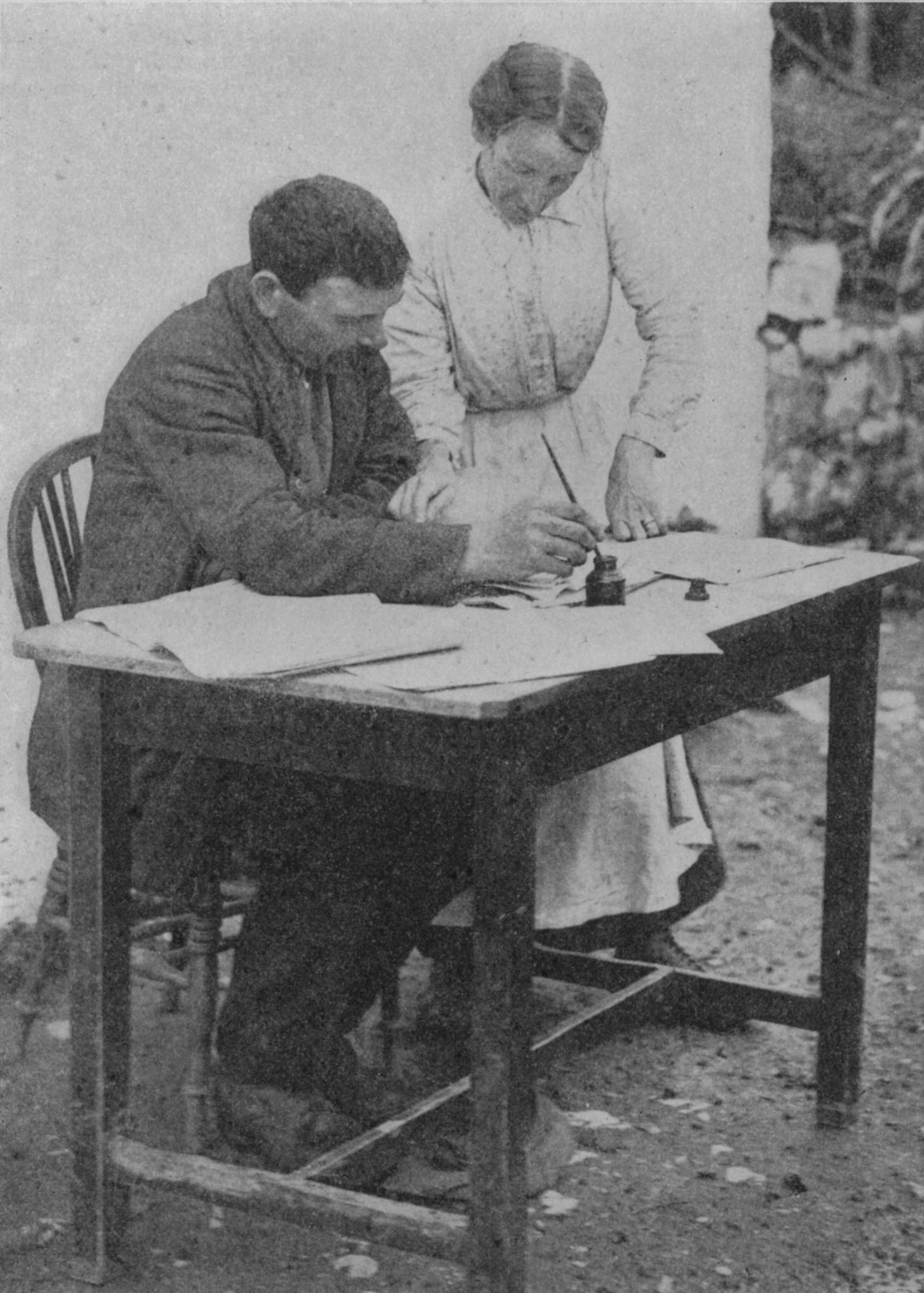
Thomas Hand presides over a Dáil Court weeks before his death

Thomas Hand (Irish: Tomás Ó Laihim) (17 June 1878 – 5 December 1920) was an Irish republican who was a member of the Gaelic League and the 5th battalion of the Irish Republican Army and the Irish Volunteers. He was also the secretary of the Irish Transport and General Workers Union of his branch.

== Early life ==
Born in Baltrasna in Skerries, County Dublin, Thomas Hand was one of twelve children of Patrick and Mary (née Farrell) Hand. Patrick Hand was a farm labourer.

== Revolutionary activity ==
Hand took part in the Easter Rising and fought under Thomas Ashe in Ashbourne. After the rising he was sent to Frongoch internment camp, where he was held from May 1916 to May 1917.

During the Irish War of Independence he was on the run and stayed at numerous safe houses. He presided at an Arbitration court in 1920. He was shot on 5 December 1920 at his home by the Black and Tans. The Tans had surrounded his house and he was fatally shot in the head and the chest at a window.

His brother Cathal was at home when he was killed and recalled that while being interrogated by The Tans he heard gunshots, when he was finally allowed to go outside he saw his brother's body below a window in the backyard in a pool of blood. Hand is buried at Baldungan Castle.

== Legacy ==
In the late 1940s a street in his hometown of Skerries, County Dublin was named after him.

In September 2005 a plaque was unveiled on Baltrasna Lane where he had lived by his niece, Molly Wherity. The Hand, MacGowan and Sherlock memorial in his place of burial, Baldungan Castle cemetery, is named after and dedicated to him.

On 23 April 2016 a tree was planted in honour of Hand and two others in Skerries Harps GAA clubhouse.
