= Measle (boat) =

1960s and 1970s design of sailing boat

The Measle is a small sailing boat, popular in Ireland in the 1960s and 1970s.

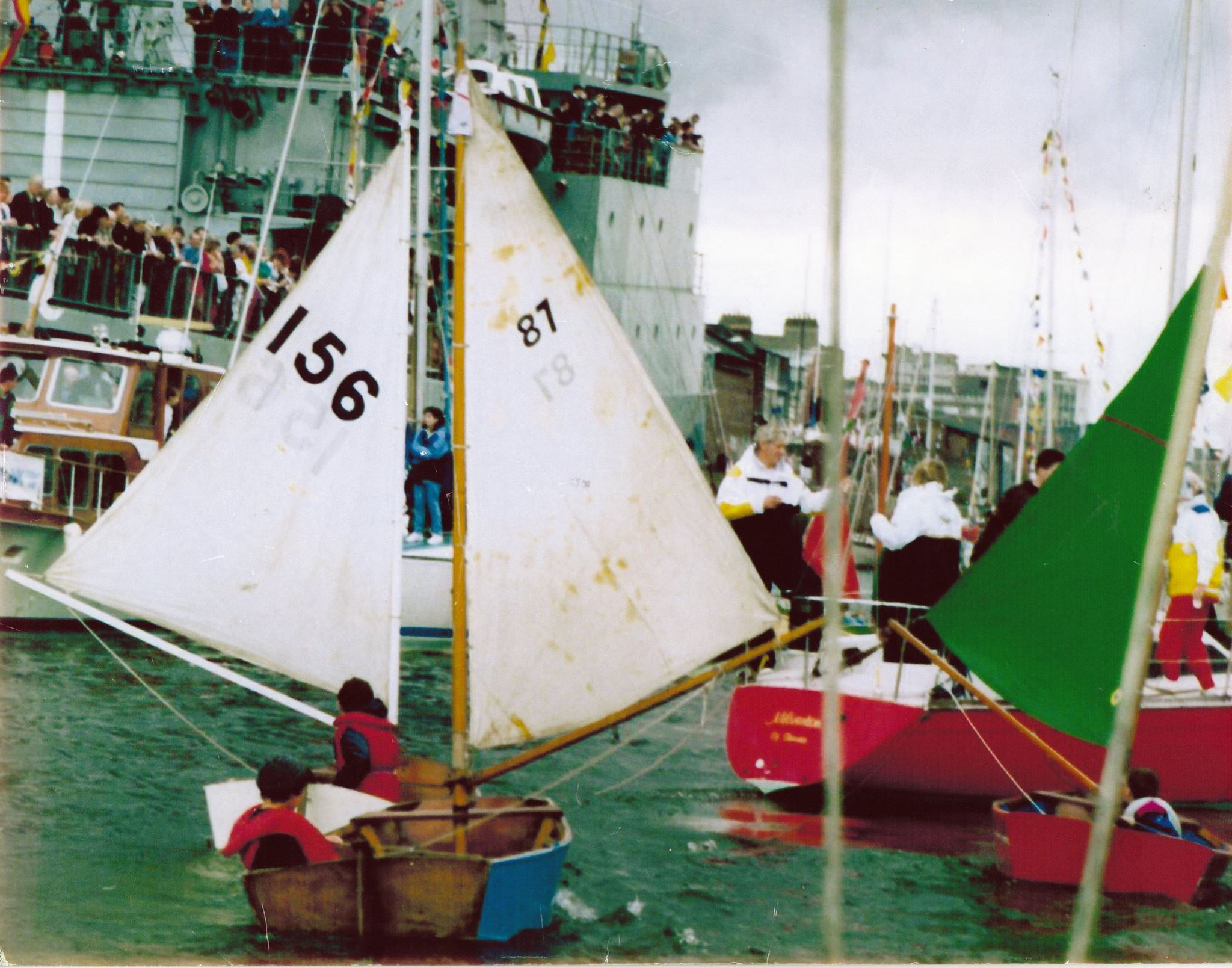
Skerries sailors Cian Synnott, Derek Davis, and Rory Cumisky sail three Measle sailing dinghies part of the Dublin Millennium parade on the River Liffey in 1988

== Design and characteristics ==
The Measle was an 8ft by 4ft 9" singlehanded one-design wooden sailing pram dinghy for children aged seven to 15.

Measles were sailed, raced, team-raced; and could also be rowed and fitted with an outboard motor or used as a tender, in many places across the island of Ireland and have been described as 'a long-forgotten precursor to the Optimist class'.

The design was drafted and introduced in Skerries, County Dublin, Ireland, by local award-winning naval architect Brian Malone in 1960.

When released, the boat was likened somewhat naïvely to the Olympic Finn dinghy of the time because of the cat-rigged bermuda-style sail on an unstayed wooden mast.

The Measle design below the waterline has a deep rocker, a flat bottom, a skeg attached to the hog, a daggerboard for lateral resistance, and a shallow draft of 4". The boat has two hard chines and slightly flared sides. Its width is about half the boat's length, making it stable. Builder of the Beatle Gerry Owens Jr was paraphrased as saying 'the small area of sail and broad beam make them safe for very young children'.

The class was 'given its unnautical name by the designer who predicted they would spread like a rash all over the place'.

The Measle typically had a softwood frame, with hardwood thwarts and benches and was "built of marine plywood, very simply rigged to carry a single sail of 33 sq feet, cheap to build and maintain, and suitable for teaching youngsters to row and sail".

For buoyancy, Measles typically carried polystyrene foam under a stern bench and in the centre cavity under the fore-and-aft centre thwart surrounding the daggerboard case.

The heel of the mast was stepped in the front of the wide fore-and-aft thwart, which extended aft and up over the daggerboard case to provide a comfortable seat for rowing.

The luff of the loose-footed sail was laced to a round wooden mast. The wooden boom was supported by the luff and was attached to the mast by a simple crutch-style gooseneck. The mainsail was aft-sheeted.

== Popularity, growth, and success ==
The Measle was designed at a time when recreational sailing and boatbuilding rapidly became popular in Ireland, and several years before more efficient junior boats were introduced to the nation.

Outside Skerries, nearby Rush Sailing Club 'had the honour of being the first club to hold a regatta race for the new small racing dinghy', in July 1961.

The Measle won second place in the 1962 London Boat Show boat design competition, sponsored by Stanley Works, to find 'an easy-to-build boat for amateurs'. Mr Malone was presented with a GBP£50 chest of tools and was congratulated by renowned boat designer Uffa Fox. First prize went to the Stanley 10 dinghy.

The Measle Beatle came second in the Esso amateur boatbuilding competition at the 1964 Dublin Boat Show in the Royal Dublin Society, earning IR£45 for builder G Owens of Fitzwilliam Sq. Amateur Fireball dinghy builders were awarded first and third prizes. Several Measles were entered.

By 1964, sailing clubs members at Clontarf, Malahide, and Skerries were 'building strong fleets' of Measles

The Irish Press reported in 1964: "Few sports have developed as rapidly as boating and sailing. All over Ireland there is a flurry of boat building in technical schools, in clubs, and even back gardens. Most Irish sailing clubs now run junior sections".

The class growth was so fast, the 1964 Championship of Ireland was postponed by a month "because of the increased number of boats in the Measle class. The new date will give these new owners additional time to become experienced in the handling of their new boats which should make for better racing. It is also hoped the new date will increase the entry for the championships for new boats, now nearing completion".

While 'Measle Championships of Ireland' were held in 1961, 1962, and 1963; the 1964 edition 'over a long, stiff course' at Skerries was reported as the 'first'.

A 'superb' fully-rigged Measle built by Hugh Devlin of Skerries for the 1966 boat show amateur boatbuilding competition was the centrepiece of the eleventh Boyne Yacht Club annual dinner dance at the White Horse Hotel in Drogheda.

Twelve Measles were delivered across the country to Royal Munster Yacht Club in June 1966 in time for local training courses.

The first female sailor to win the Measle Championships of Ireland was Siobhan Hurding, 14, from Clontarf Yacht and Boat Club, in 1967.

By 1968, Skerries boasted a home fleet of 40 Measles, and the fleet travelled far to compete in local regattas, such as when nine girls and boys from Skerries sailed in the 1967 Dundalk Bay Sailing Club regatta.

A preview of the 1968 championship declared Measles were expected from 'most east coast clubs'.

Measles have been recorded sailing at Skerries Sailing Club, Rush Sailing Club, Malahide Sailing Club, Clontarf Yacht and Boat Club, Royal Munster Yacht Club, Dundalk Sailing Club, Swords Sailing Club, and at Crosshaven Regatta.

It was suggested in 1972 that the Measle, with 220 boats registered, "now must rate as one of the biggest classes in Ireland".

Measle sail numbers had reached at least 240 by 1991.

=== Measles at the Fifth Port of Dublin Sea Scouts ===
The self-claimed Measle long-distance record was set in 1965 when three Measles cruised down the River Barrow from Monasterevin to Passage East as part of a Dollymount fifth Port of Dublin Sea Scouts excursion of 21 boys and three officers, alongside canoes and a rowing skiff. It was reported: "unfortunately, the wind for the entire period of the cruise was blowing upriver and it was impossible to sail. The Measles had to be rowed the whole way - a distance of 81 miles!".

The 18-strong Dollymount scout troop had built seven Measles, at a cost of IR£23 per completed boat, in a loft workshop in Dublin's Pearse Street over the 1963/4 winter. They sold four of those boats to help pay for the three boats retained in their fleet, numbers 50, 51, and 52. One of those Measles, Virgo, was still sailed by the scouts by 2005.

The scout troop in 1964 had proposed a marathon trip in its Measles down the Erne and Shannon waterways, from Ballyshannon to Killaloe. It's unclear if this occurred.

== Demise ==
The Measle was outclassed in Ireland by the popularity of the lighter and faster International Optimist dinghy.

The Optimist was introduced in Northern Ireland in 1964/65 and started appearing in the Republic of Ireland in 1966. The Optimist class held a national championship at the National Yacht Club in 1968.

The Measle class became limited, and remained strong only in Skerries and Clontarf as Optimist numbers caught up and reached about 250 in 1978 - the first year Ireland represented at the Optimist World Championships.

Measle designer Brian Malone died in the early days of the boat's growth, aged 37 on 27 April 1963, and the class failed to modernise.

The Optimist kept up with technology; and affordable, production, low-maintenance glass-reinforced plastic Optimists were introduced in 1970. Light aluminium spars followed in 1973. And easy-to-build stitch-and-glue epoxy/wood Optimists were ratified in 1981 - the final year wooden Optimists attended world championships; which that year was held on the Measle's doorstep, in Howth.

Much of the sails, spars, rudders, and centreboards of the few dozen remaining sailing Measles in Skerries were destroyed in a fire in the junior shed at the back of Skerries Sailing Club at the start of the 1995 sailing season, which effectively put a full stop to the fleet.

== Legacy ==
Notable people who sailed a Measle include offshore sailor Joe English, 1994 Round Ireland Yacht Race winning skipper Peter Wilson, and Seoul Olympics Irish team reserve Maeve McNally.

The building of six Measles at Clontarf Yacht and Boat Club in 1963 as part of the establishment of its junior section was cited as a turning point in the development of sailing at the club. Twenty-five new junior sailors were trained in the Measles in 1964 in Clontarf's pioneering sail training program. Sailing courses for the fathers of those Measle sailors were then introduced.

The 'Senior Measles Championships of the World' at Clontarf Yacht and Boat Club, and the 'Measles Championship of Europe', held inside Howth Harbour, were tongue-in-cheek events. The latter was billed as part of the Howth Festival of the Sea, opened by festival patron and then-finance minister and future taoiseach Charles Haughey. The 'world' championship was an informal one-day end-of-season RNLI fundraiser run in heats for adults. It was organised at Clontarf for several years by Dublin tailor and local sailor Jack O'Rourke and was reported by the Evening Herald as 'a bit of a lorry up. There was nothing international about this travesty of sailing'.

Irish Examiner journalist Alannah Hopkin wrote jokingly in 2000 that 'few competitive yachtsmen would admit to having started their career in the a dinghy known as a Measle'.

The Measle class trophies, including the Championship of Ireland Trophy and the Brian Malone Memorial Cup, have been re-assigned as perpetual Optimist class prizes at Skerries Sailing Club.

Measle number 1, Huck Finn, was found derelict in a Skerries garden but was rescued and has been restored to sailing condition by former Measle sailor Martin O'Toole of Man o'War in 2021.

== Available results ==
Year	Regatta	Host club	Boats entered	Results
1960	Skerries Sailing Club regatta	SSC	6	1 / T Hegarty / Huck Finn / SSC; 2 / A O'Loughlin / Midget / SSC; 3 / J Dempsey / Mrs Moan II / SSC; 4 / / Cherub / SSC; 5 / / Shell / SSC; Retired / / Scuttyark / SSC
1961	Measle Championship of Ireland	SSC		1 / T Hegarty / SSC; 2 / A O'Loughlin / SSC; 3 / J Dempsey / SSC
1962	Measle Championships of Ireland	SSC	9	1 / M McMahon / Scutty Ark; 2 / T Hegarty / Huck Finn; 3 / J Dempsey / Hooker; 4 / / Molly; 5 / / Swan; 6 / / Pop Eye; Retired / / Midget, Shell, Mrs Moan II
1963	Measle Championship of Ireland	SSC		1 / T Hegarty / SSC
1964	Irish Measle Championship of Ireland	SSC	17	1 / David O'Rourke / Oh Seven / CYBC; 2 / G Dempsey / Huck Finn / SSC; 3 / D McMahon / Smart
1965				
1966	Measle Championship of Ireland	MSC	31	1 / Jonathan O'Rourke / CYBC; 2 / G Byrne / CYBC; 3 / Miss S Hurding / CYBC; 4 / D Dardis / SSC; 5 / R Flanagan / SSC; 6 / P Cooper / CYBC
1966	World Senior Measles Championships	CYBC	70 helms	1 / Gerry Watson / Malahide; 2 / Gerry Owens / RStGYC; 3 / Richard Burrows / Malahide
1967	Measle Championship of Ireland	CYBC	40	1 / Siobhan Hurding / CYBC
1968	Measles Championship of Ireland	SSC		1 / Kiernan Byrne / Manahan; 2 Karl Grimes / Shrimp; 3 / Kalanne O'Leary / CJ; 4 / P Jenkinson / Black Raven; 5 / N McGrotty / Seaspray; 6 / N Smithwick / Bluebell
1969	Measles Championships of Europe in Howth harbour, organised by CYBC			1 / K Byrne / Annan; 2 / I Sutton / Skylark; 3 / R Headon / Snoopy; 4 / G Headon / Sea dream; 5 / R O Rourke / Susan; 6 / T Reilly / Signal; 7 / M Dumphy / May
1969	Measles Championship of Ireland	CYBC	19	1 / Karl Grimes / Shrimp / SSC; 2 / Niall McGrotty / Sea spray / SSC; 3 / Kieran Byrne / Mananan / CYBC
1970	Measles Championship of Ireland	SSC	28	1 / D Cahill / Yellow Sub / SSC; 2 / M Cahill / Neptune / SSC; 3 / R Headon / Snoopy / CYBC
1971	Measles Championship of Ireland	CYBC	18	1 / Donal Byrne / Mannaman / CYBC; 2 / P Jenkinson / Black Raven / SSC; 3 / I Sutton / Skylark / CYBC
1972	Measles Championship of Ireland	SSC	37	1 / Miss Debbie Courtney / Severine; 2 / Conor McNally / Rubella; 3 / Glen Styles / Lupilu; Also sailed: Ross McNally, Bruitini; Aidan Byrne, Manannan; Elizabeth Reynolds, Elka, Shane Peel, Dodo.
1973	Measles Championship of Ireland	Kilbarrack SC		
1974	Measles Championship of Ireland	SSC		1 / Mark Styles / Lupylu; 2 / J Boylan; 3 / H Devlin
1975	Measles Championship of Ireland	CYBC		1 / H Devlin / Seamirrow / SSC; 2 / R McNally / Sysan / SSC; 3 / D Courtney / Severine / SSC
1976	Measles Championship of Ireland			1 / Hugh Devlin
1977	Measles Championship of Ireland	MSC		1 / Kevin Devlin / SSC; 2 / Maeve McNally / SSC; 3 / Robert Moorehouse / SSC
1980	Measles Championship of Ireland	SSC		
