= Bokkura =

Type of boat used in the Maldives

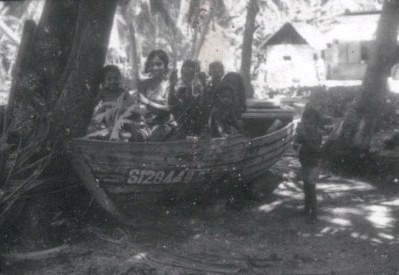
Children playing on a bokkura, Fua Mulaku

A bokkura (Dhivehi: ބޮއްކުރާ) is the smallest type of boat commonly used in Maldives. It has slight similarities to a dhoni, but is smaller in size, holding just two or three individuals, and without lateen sails. A bokkura usually has a set of oars, and was traditionally used for fishing near reefs or to commute between the shore and anchored fishing or trading vessels especially before there were any jetties on the Maldives.
