= Frongoch internment camp =

Internment camp in Wales

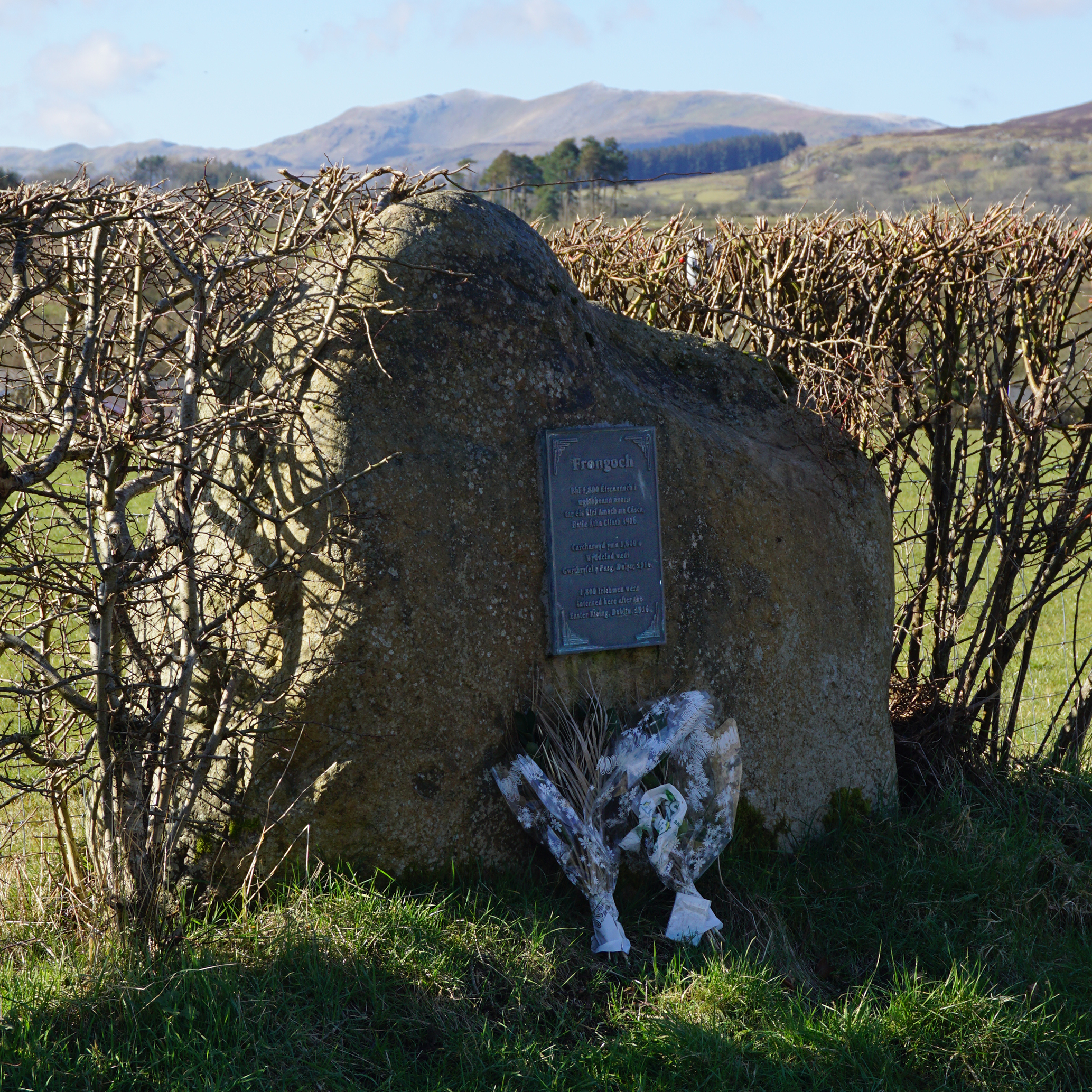

- Location within Wales Location within British Isles
- Location: Frongoch, Merionethshire, Wales; 52.939°N 3.632°W
- Security class: Prisoner-of-war camp
- Population: 1,800 (1916)
- Opened: June 1916
- Closed: December 1916
- Governor: F. A. Heygate Lambert

Frongoch internment camp at Frongoch in Merionethshire, Wales was a makeshift Prisoner-of-war camp during the First World War and the 1916 Easter Rising.

== History ==
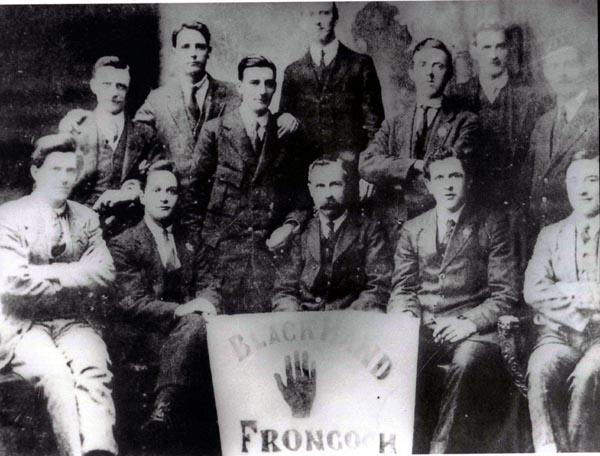
Frongoch prisoners of war from the Easter Rising of Ireland

Originally the camp housed German prisoners of war in a yellow distillery and crude huts, but in the wake of the 1916 Easter Rising in Dublin, Ireland, the German prisoners were moved and it was used as an internment camp for approximately 1,800 Irish republicans, among them such notables as Michael Collins, who were accorded the status of prisoners of war. Among the prisoners were the future Hollywood actor Arthur Shields and sportsman and referee Tom Burke. It is a common misconception that Éamon de Valera was also imprisoned at Frongoch; he was actually held at several prisons in England at this time.

Colonel Frederick Arthur Heygate Lambert was the camp commandant.

The Irish Republican internees elected their own commandants (this practice was followed in future imprisonments/internments) and established a chain of command. The camp became a breeding ground for the guerillas of the Irish rebels, with inspired organisers such as Michael Collins giving impromptu lessons in guerrilla tactics. Later the camp became known as ollscoil na réabhlóide, the "University of Revolution".

The prisoners were allowed to cross the Afon Tryweryn to a meadow on Rhyd y Defaid (lit. 'sheep-run') Farm where they played various sports, including Gaelic football.

Lord Decies was appointed as Chief Press Censor for Ireland after the Rising in 1916, and he warned the press to be careful about what they published. William O'Brien's Cork Free Press was one of the first papers he suppressed under the Defence of the Realm Act 1914 (DORA regulations) after its republican editor, Frank Gallagher, accused the British authorities of lying about the conditions and treatment of republican prisoners at the camp.

In October, the camp was overrun by rats.

The camp was emptied in late December 1916 when David Lloyd George replaced H. H. Asquith as Prime Minister.

== Commemoration ==
The local Welsh medium school, Ysgol Bro Tryweryn, now stands on the site of the internment camp, but a commemorative plaque stands nearby, with inscriptions in Irish, Welsh and English.

In 2016, on the hundredth anniversary of the internment of Irish prisoners at Frongoch, the local community organized a number of commemoration events and the history of the camp was widely reported. In the same year there was also an exhibition at the National Museum of Ireland. Objects in their collection include: a Gaelic football adapted from a rugby ball, used in games at the camp; puttees made by Patrick Keegan; amongst others.

== List of notable internees involved in the Easter Rising ==
Non-exhaustive list of notable internees:

- Denny Barry
- Gerald Boland
- Tom Burke
- Michael Carolan
- Joe Clarke
- Harry Colley
- Con Collins
- Michael Collins
- W. T. Cosgrave
- Philip Cosgrave
- Paddy Daly
- P. T. Daly
- Henry Dixon
- Dick Fitzgerald
- Thomas Hand
- John MacDonagh
- Tom McEllistrim
- Seán McGarry
- Patrick McGrath
- Dick McKee
- Seán McLoughlin
- Seán Mac Mahon
- Patrick Moran
- James Nowlan
- Seán Nunan
- J. J. O'Connell
- Batt O'Connor
- Joseph O'Connor
- Joseph O'Doherty
- Brian O'Higgins
- Patrick O'Keeffe
- Seán O'Mahony
- Cathal Ó Murchadha
- Liam Ó Rinn
- Gearóid O'Sullivan
- Richard James Pearle*
- Kit Poole
- Séumas Robinson
- Arthur Shields
- Michael Staines
- Thomas Traynor

== Bibliography ==
- Brennan-Whitmore, W, With the Irish in Frongoch (Dublin 1918; republished 2013)
- Ebenezer, Lyn, Fron-Goch and the birth of the IRA (London 2006)
- O'Mahony, Sean (1987). Frongoch: University of Revolution. Dublin: FDR Teoranta.
