= Dhoni (fishing vessel) =

Multi-purpose sailboat

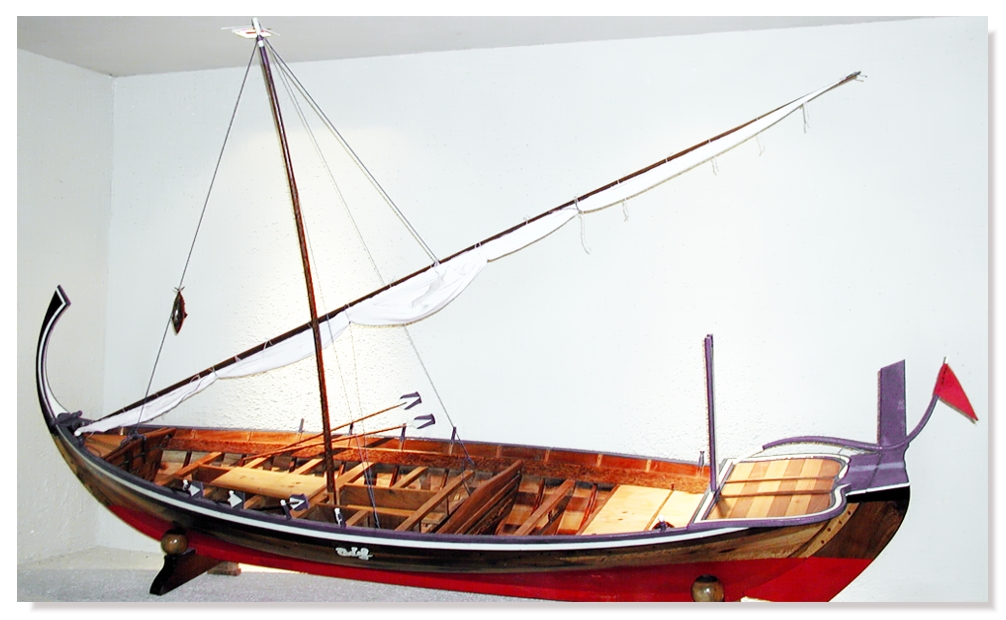
The dhoni is the traditional fishing boat of the Maldives.

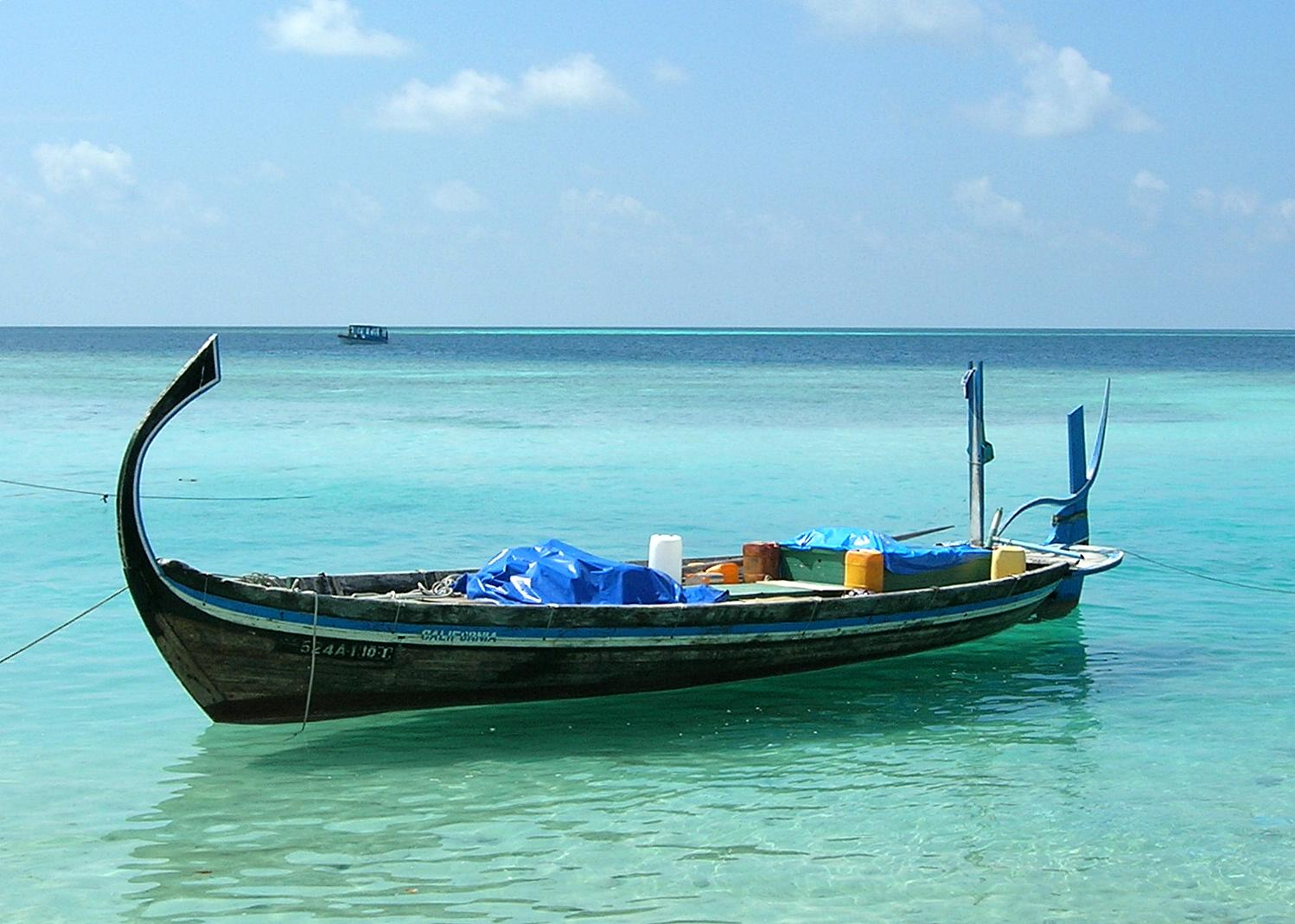
A dhoni without lateen sails.

A dhoni (also written as thoni or dhoney) is a traditional multi-purpose sailvessel with a motor or lateen sails that is used in the Maldives, South India and Sri Lanka. Varying in size and shape, they are used as fishing vessel, ferry, trading- and cargo ship.

== Origin ==
=== Etymology ===
The term dhoni derives from Sanskrit dróṇa, meaning "wooden trough". Another theory presupposes a Dravidian (Tamil-Malayalam) origin, derived from the root word tull meaning "to dig" because the early traditional dhonis were made from a scooped or dug out single log.

=== History ===
Toni is mentioned in a Tamil inscription of about 1200/1256 CE from Krishnapattinam on the Andhra coast.

The traditional dhoni is one of the oldest known sea vessels in the Maldives. Many of these traditional sailing vessels were, of necessity, built using coconut palm timber. The sailing dhoni was used in earlier days by Maldivian fishermen. During the industrial revolution many fisherman changed to a mechanised dhoni.

The Tamil, Kannada and Konkani word for a small boat is doni and the Malayalam word for a small boat is tuoni, perhaps due to the tradelinks between Arabs and the Konkani people in Goa and other port cities in Konkan and Coastal South West India. Also of note is that the Somali word for small boat is doon, perhaps due to shared maritime history.

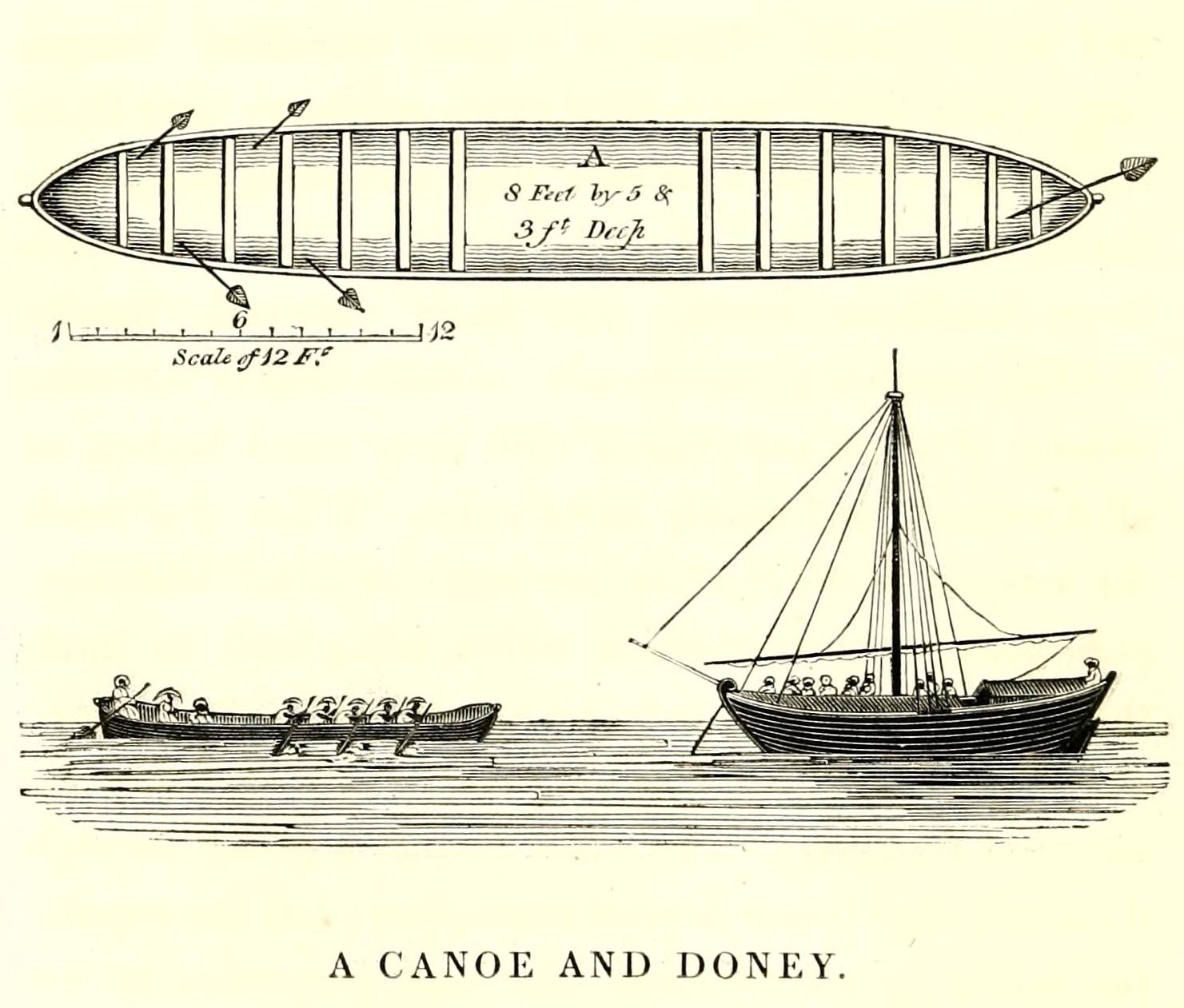
A square-rigged dhoni at the lower right of the image.

James Welsh, recounting his 40-year service in India, described doni:

The Doney, or Tony, of the Eastern coast, is a large awkward vessel, and carries very heavy cargoes, even to the ports on the western shore of the Peninsula. They have one mast, and a square sail, sometimes using a small topsail. They are reckoned sea-worthy; but have no accommodation for Europeans, and are generally very heavy sailers.

== Construction ==
Dhonis used to be built without plans. The master carpenter took measurements and gave instructions to the carpenters. Contemporary dhonis are often built using fibreglass. Dhonis fitted with diesel engines are extensively used on resort islands for scuba diving purposes, their low freeboard being ideal for this activity.

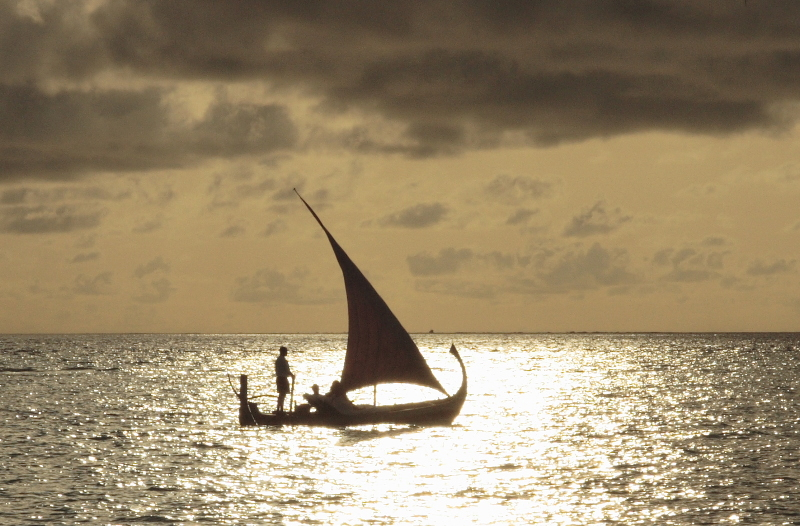
A dhoni with lateen sails.

The islands of the Maldives have an extensive fishing fleet of vessels built domestically, each of which carries eight to twelve persons. Nearly all of these are variants of the dhoni, a plank-built craft traditionally built with coconut timber, although imported wood from Southeast Asia is increasingly used. Originally sailing craft, nowadays these boats are usually fitted with motors. The main site for building dhonis is in Alifushi in Raa Atoll. Dhoni building is a traditional craft in the Maldives, and young apprentices are trained by skilled craftsmen. Boats crafted from timber take 60 days to complete.

== Upgrades ==
Using a US$3.2 million loan from the International Development Association (IDA), most of the boats were mechanised during the 1980s. Although the addition of motors added fuel costs to operating expenses, it resulted in a doubling of the fishing catch between 1982 and 1985. Moreover, the 1992 catch of 82,000 tons set a record; for example, in 1987 the catch was 56,900 tons.

== Usage ==
In 1995 there were 1674 registered fishing vessels in the Maldives. Of these, 1407 were motorised pole and line craft (masdhoni) for tuna fishing in coastal waters, five were sailing masdhoni, 48 were mechanised vadhudhoni, 209 were sailing vadhudhoni and 5 were rowboats used for trawling in reef waters.

== See also ==
- Bokkura
