= Rockabill =

Pair of granite rock islands ("Rock" and "Bill") off the east coast of Ireland

Native name: Cloch Dábhiolla Nickname: The Cow and The Calf
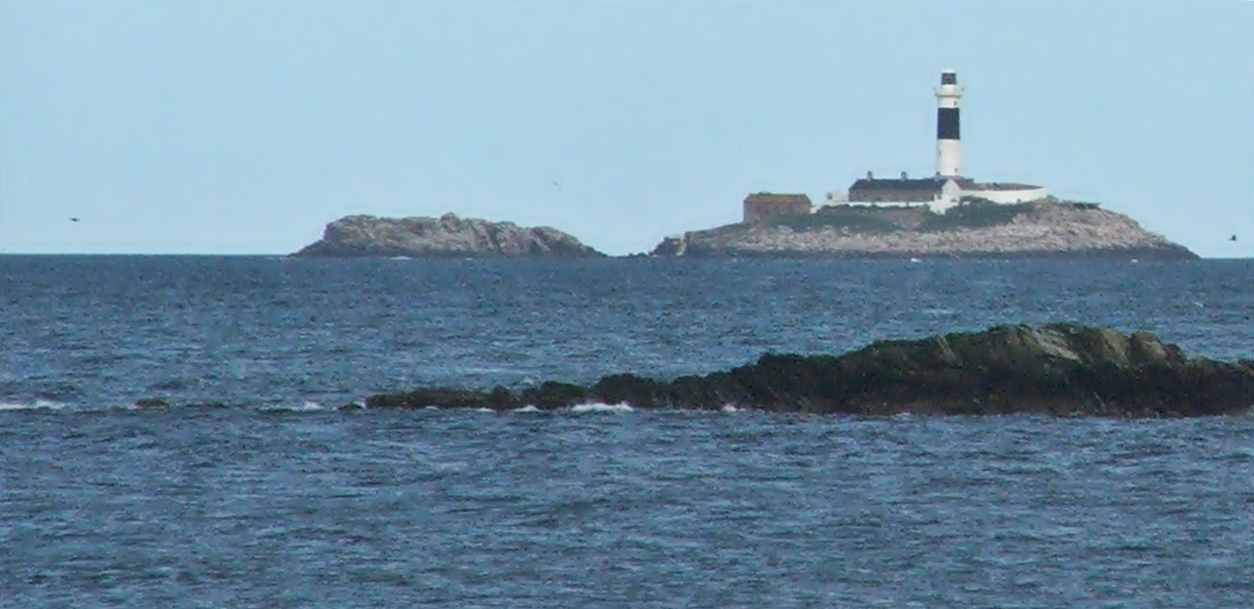

- Location within Ireland

Geography
- Location: Irish Sea
- Coordinates: 53.°35.49′N 6.°0.16′W
- Archipelago: Rockabill
- Total islands: 2 (The Rock and The Bill)
- Major islands: The Rock

Administration
- Ireland
- Province: Leinster
- County: Dublin
- Barony: Skerries

Demographics
- Population: 2, May through August (2014)

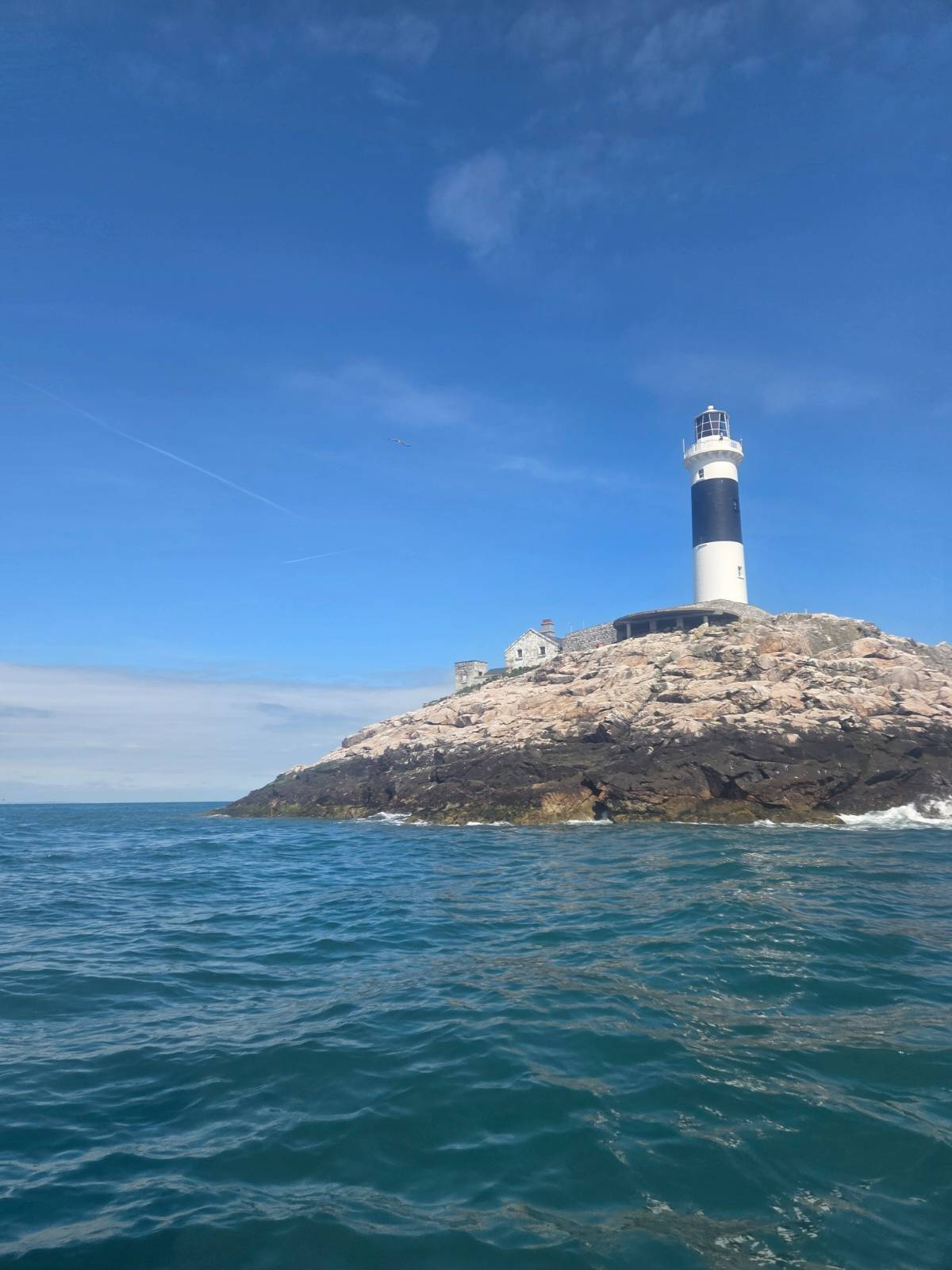
The Rock of Rockabill with helicopter pad visible

Rockabill (Irish: Cloch Dábhiolla) is a close pair of islands (Rock and Bill) in the western Irish Sea about 6 kilometres east-north-east of Skerries, County Dublin, Ireland. The two granite islands are separated by a channel about 20 metres wide. On the Rock there is a lighthouse, built 1855–1860 from granite and limestone and automated in 1989, and several walls and outbuildings.

== Environment ==
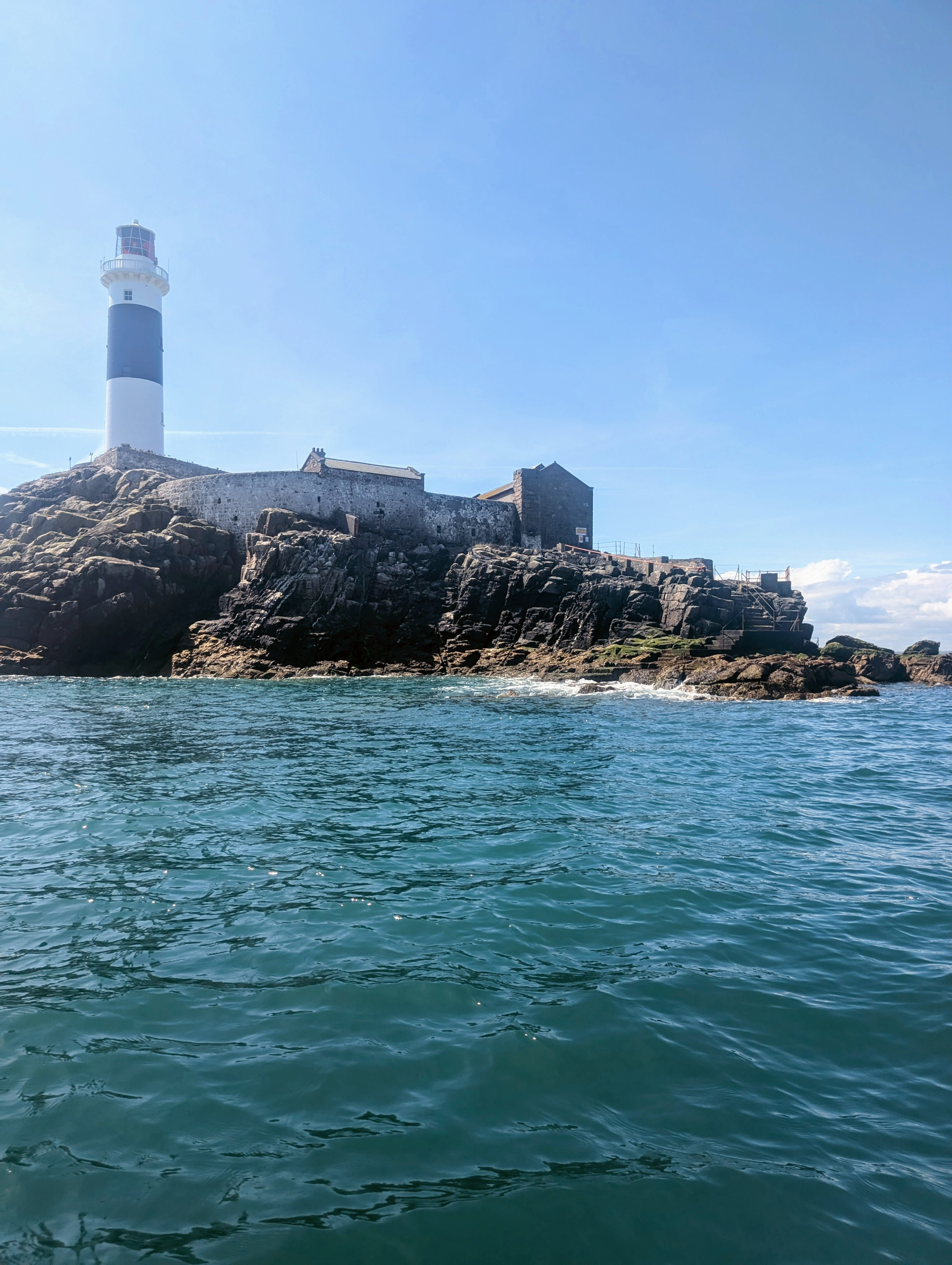
The Rock of Rockabill

The walled areas of the Rock have enabled a build-up of soil and the establishment of vegetation, notably tree mallow (Malva arborea), which provides nesting cover for the birds. The Bill is smaller and has very little vegetation.

Rockabill is an important seabird breeding island, especially notable for its terns. It is an internationally important site for roseate terns, with the largest colony in Europe, 1,597 pairs, and 2,085 pairs of Common Terns (2017 data). Other seabirds include black guillemots and black-legged kittiwakes. It has been designated an Important Bird Area (IBA) by BirdLife International because of its seabird colonies.

Rockabill Lighthouse is owned by the Commissioners of Irish Lights and is a Refuge for Fauna and a Special Protection Area under the European Union Birds Directive. Since 1989, when the protection afforded by the lighthouse keepers ceased, the islands have been managed by BirdWatch Ireland. The sea area between Rockabill and Dalkey Island has recently been proposed as a Special Area of Conservation.
