= Skerries, County Dublin =

Small coastal town in north County Dublin, Ireland

Skerries Na Sceirí (Irish)
- Town
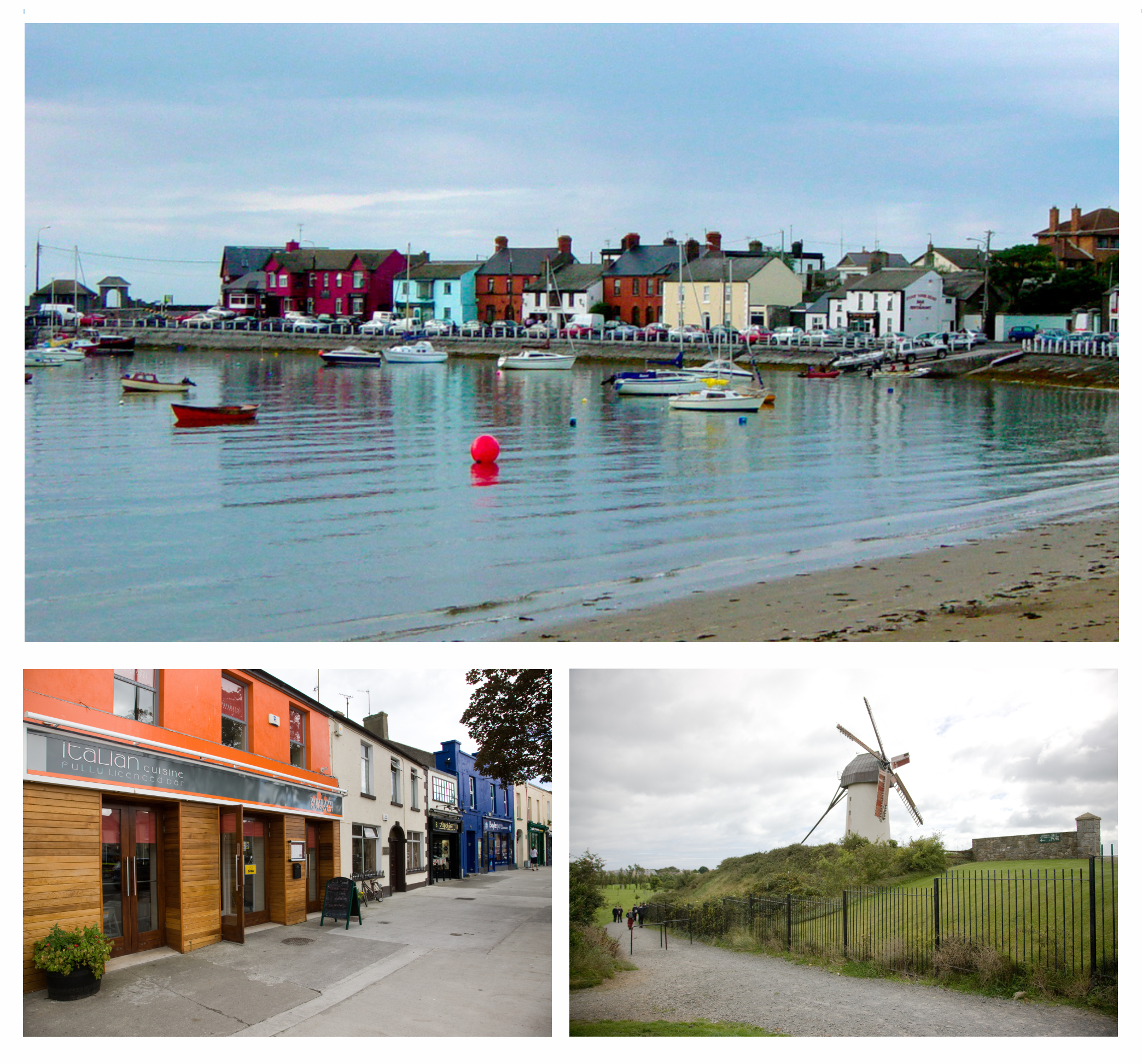
- Clockwise from top: Brightly painted houses lining Skerries harbour; the Great Windmill; businesses on Strand Street

- Location in Ireland
- Coordinates: 53.5828°N 6.1083°W
- Country: Ireland
- Province: Leinster
- County: County Dublin
- Local government area: Fingal
- Elevation: 5 m (16 ft)

Population (2022)
  - Urban: 10,743
- Time zone: UTC±0 (WET)
  - Summer (DST): UTC+1 (IST)
- Eircode routing key: K34
- Telephone area code: +353(0)1
- Irish Grid Reference: O248606

Skerries (Irish: Na Sceirí, meaning 'rocky islands') is a coastal town in the north of County Dublin, Ireland. It is within the Fingal local government area. Skerries was historically a fishing port and later a centre of hand embroidery. These industries declined in the early 20th century, however, and it became both a resort town and a commuter town for Dublin 30 km (19 mi) to the south. Offshore from the town are several islands, one of which is a nature reserve, Rockabill.

== Etymology ==
The name Skerries comes from the Old Norse word sker (Irish: sceir), referring to a skerry − a small rocky island or reef which may be covered during high tide. In Irish this is pluralised as na sceirí.

== Geography ==
Skerries
Year	Pop.	±%
1991	7,032	—
1996	7,339	+4.4%
2002	9,149	+24.7%
2006	9,535	+4.2%
2011	9,671	+1.4%
2016	10,043	+3.8%
2022	10,743	+7.0%

Skerries is on gently sloping land approaching the coast, which is partly overlooked by low bluffs. There are hills around, including Mill Hill, where a windmill has long been sited. The town itself is built around three long streets - Strand Street, Church Street and Balbriggan Road, and between the surrounding hills and beaches. Skerries South Strand is a long sandy beach (2.5 km; 1½ miles long). Red Island, Mill Hill, Hillside, the nearby Ardgillan Park and Demesne, Barnageeragh and to a lesser extent Baldungan Castle, provide vantages overlooking the town.

The town has five islands off its coast: Shenick Island, St Patrick's, Colt and the island formation of Rockabill, which comprises "The Cow" and "The Calf", separated by a narrow channel. There is also Red Island, which is a tied island.

Rockabill has the largest number of breeding roseate terns in Europe. It is also the farthest set of islands from the town and has a lighthouse which is 4 miles from the nearest path on the mainland at Red Island.

The Martello tower on Shenick Island is one of a number of defensive towers erected during the Napoleonic Wars along the Irish coast by the British. The tower is situated 1 mile from the great windmill and a similar distance from both the Monument on Strand Street and the other Martello tower on Red Island. This forms an almost perfect arc through the major tall secular structures in the town with the Martello tower on Shenick at the centre. Shenick Island is accessible on foot at the lowest tides, but potentially problematic, due to turning tides. The other islands are harder to reach, but it is possible by boat. St Patrick's Island is so-called because Saint Patrick is reputed to have landed on the island.

== History ==
=== Invasions and saints ===
Early writers tell how an island off Skerries was used as a landing place for an invasion, which happened in the second century C.E.. This island was either Shenick or Red Island, which would have been a tidal island at the time. When the invaders landed, they formed ranks and at low tide marched to the mainland, where they were promptly defeated at the ancient settlement of Knocknagin, north of Balbriggan. The islands were previously known as the Islands of Cor possibly after the original inhabitants.

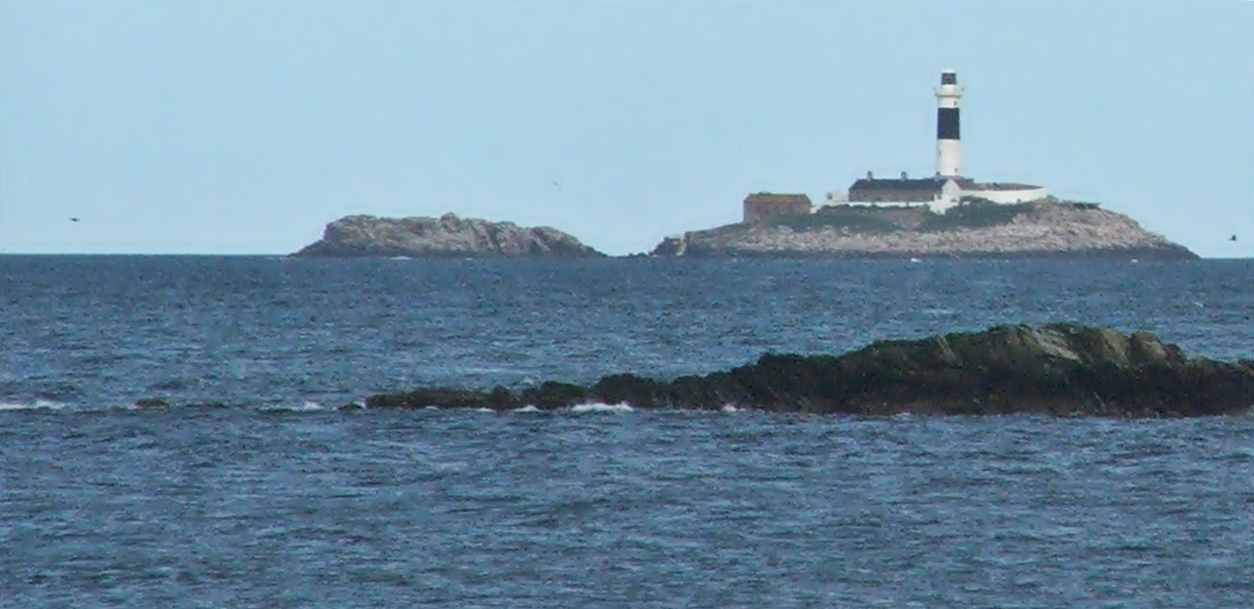
Skerries Lighthouse on Rockabill island

As noted, in AD 432, St. Patrick landed on Church Island, and, according to the Annals of Inisfallen, Saint Mochonna founded a monastery shortly afterwards.

In AD 797, the Vikings (or Danes) carried out one of their earliest raids in Ireland when they plundered the monastery on Church Island. As the origin of the name is Norse and many localities have Norse-based names, it is assumed that the Vikings did settle and occupy the area. Sitric, who was a son of a Dane called Murchard, re-founded the monastery on Church Island in 1120. He dedicated it to St. Patrick, the Apostle of Ireland. By this time, the Hiberno-Norse who had settled in Ireland had become Christians.

In 1148, Saint Malachy, Archbishop of Armagh, arranged a synod on St. Patrick's island to settle differences between the Irish Christians and the Pope. Fifteen bishops, two hundred priests, and other clergy, were present.

=== Middle Ages ===
In 1320, the manor of Skerries was granted to Sir Michael le Veel; his descendants Anglicised their name to Calf.

The Prior of Holmpatrick received permission to build a pier in 1496 from Henry VII, Lord of Ireland. At this time, Skerries was the property of the monastery of Holmpatrick and was known as the Port of Holmpatrick.

=== Reformation era ===
In 1565, after the Reformation, the monastery and its lands became the property of Thomas Fitzpatrick. He was tasked with the upkeep of the harbour which cost him between 200 to 300 pounds.

In the autumn of 1583, while the Catholic Church was illegal and underground, Archbishop Dermot O'Hurley arranged for a sea captain to smuggle him into Ireland from the French port of Le Croisic and drop him upon Holmpatrick Strand in Skerries. Archbishop O'Hurley, who later became one of the 24 Irish Catholic Martyrs, was met at Skerries by a priest named Fr. John Dillon, who accompanied him to Drogheda.

In 1605, the manor and lands of Holmpatrick were granted to Donogh O'Brien, 4th Earl of Thomond. The last Thomond lord of the manor, Henry O'Brien, 8th Earl of Thomond, sold the manor and lands in 1721, including the town of Skerries, to the Hamilton family of Hacketstown. Comparisons between maps of Skerries drawn in 1703 and 1760 suggest that the Hamilton family were responsible for setting out the streets of the town as they are today.

The population at the time of the 1841 census was 2,417 inhabitants.

Between 1863 and 1865, a monument to the memory of James Hans Hamilton, the local landlord and MP, was erected in Skerries. In 1897, Hamilton's son was granted the title of Baron HolmPatrick.

=== Early 20th century ===
After the 1916 rising, a British destroyer landed troops at Skerries to help the Dublin garrisons suppress the rising. 200 men of the North Staffordshire Regiment landed under the command of Captain Clay. To try to impede their progress to Dublin, local rebels blew up the bridge over the railway in Donabate. During the Irish Civil War in 1922, senior Anti-Treaty IRA leader Harry Boland was mortally wounded, officially while resisting arrest, by two officers of the National Army inside his lodgings at the Skerries Grand Hotel.

==== Holiday camps ====
The town's former school holiday camp, Gentours Children's Holiday Camp, was initially a "boys only" camp. Later it became Gentours Children's Holiday Camp.

In the late 1940s, a family holiday camp was built on Red Island by the Quinn family, who subsequently founded the Superquinn chain of supermarkets. The camp had 250 bedrooms all under one roof, along with dining and entertainment areas. In this respect, the accommodation at Red Island differed from more typical chalet facilities at other camps, such as Butlin's. The holiday business closed in the early 1970s. The ballroom continued in use as a concert venue, until all the buildings were demolished in the 1980s. Much of the Red Island site is now laid out as a public park.

=== Late 20th century ===
With a restoration starting in the late 20th century, the Skerries Mills consists of two restored and working windmills, a watermill, a museum and coffee shop. Now operated as a local amenity and tourist attraction, the sails on one of the windmills were damaged during storms in January 2007, but subsequently repaired.

In common with much of Dublin's hinterland, Skerries saw growth in residential property and associated prices during the late 1990s and early 21st century.

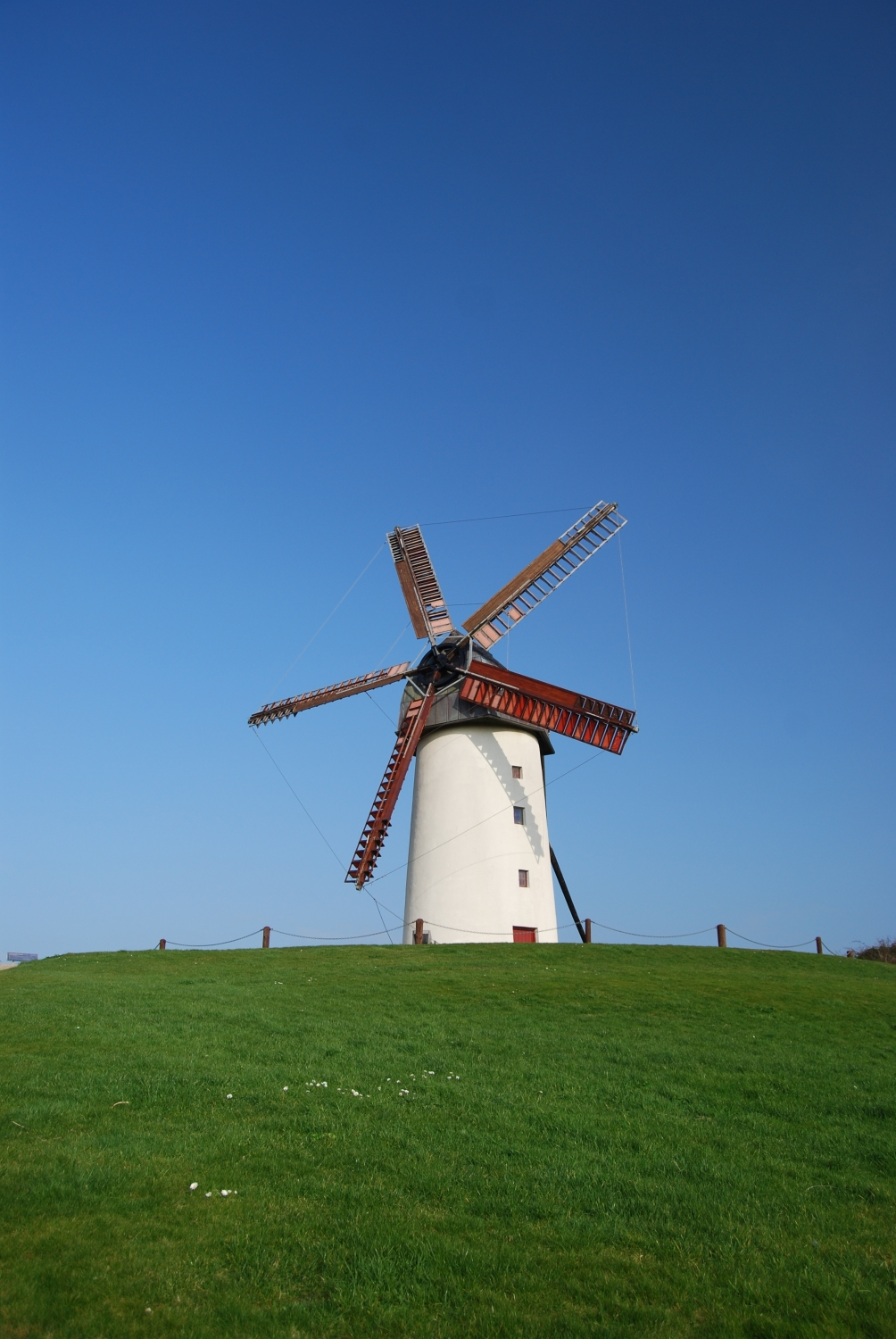
The larger of the two Skerries Mills windmills

== Education ==
The town has one second-level institution, Skerries Community College, originating from a merger in 1982 of the De La Salle College, Skerries Vocational School, and the local Holy Faith convent school. It is a co-educational school, unlike the institutions from which it formed. There are five primary schools in the town: Réalt na Mara National School, St. Patrick's National School, Holmpatrick National School, Milverton National School and Educate Together Skerries National School.

== Transport ==
The town is served by Skerries railway station, with most services terminating at Connolly and Pearse stations, Drogheda, and Dundalk. The 33 and 33A bus routes (operated by Dublin Bus and Go-Ahead Ireland respectively) pass through Skerries. The M1 motorway is the nearest major road to the town.

== Martello towers ==
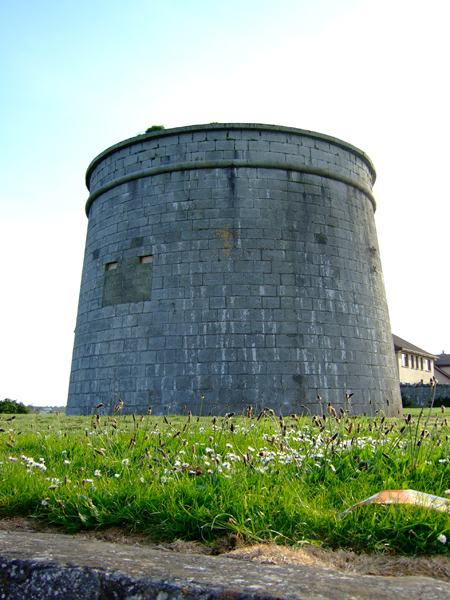
Martello Tower

The two Martello towers in Skerries, at Red Island and Shenick Island, are part of a chain of 29 Martello towers in the Greater Dublin Area constructed in the early 19th century. They were built by the British, along the Irish and English coasts. They were to serve as protection from Napoleonic French armies (in the scenario of an invasion) and as an early warning system against an attack. The tower on Red Island was used as part of the Red Island Holiday Camp. Since that was demolished in the 1980s, the tower has stood alone.

== Arts ==
=== Literary references ===
In Flann O'Brien's book The Dalkey Archive, Skerries is the location of the narrator's meeting with James Joyce. The narrator has heard a rumour that Joyce has returned from the continent and is working in a small country pub. He tracks him down to a place on the outskirts of Skerries, but Joyce denies all knowledge of "that filthy book" Ulysses.

Casey, one of Reegan's subordinate officers in John McGahern's first novel, The Barracks, is described as having previously been stationed in Skerries where he also met his wife, Teresa. In conversation with Elizabeth Reegan, the novel's protagonist, Casey describes his "great life there, near the city; the market gardening, places you couldn't throw a stone without breaking glass", while Teresa recalls the evening she met her husband: "You could still hear the music from the pavilion and it was comin' across from Red Island too, Mick Delahunty playing there that night. There was a big moon over the masts of the fishin' fleet. I knew he was mad for a court".

=== Music ===
Musicians from Skerries range from Tony Keeling and the Graduates in the showband days, through to extreme metal band Primordial which was formed in Skerries in the 1980s. Singer-songwriter Ryan O'Shaughnessy originates from Skerries, and represented Ireland in the 2018 Eurovision Song Contest.

== Awards ==
Skerries has received several awards for its scenery, culture, and community activities. For example, Skerries came second in the 2014 Best Place to Live in Ireland awards. The town is also the only place to have won an award as an entire community at RTÉ & Rehab's People of the Year Awards in 2011. In 2016, Skerries was named Ireland's Tidiest Town by the Supervalu National Tidy Towns competition. Skerries was rated as one of Europe's ten most beautiful cities by the Eating Europe Food Tours blog.

== Sport ==
Local sports clubs include Skerries Harps GAA (the local Gaelic Athletic Association club), Skerries Town F.C. (an association football (soccer) team), and Skerries RFC (the area's rugby union club).

Other clubs include Skerries Sailing Club and Skerries Rowing Club, both located by the harbour.

The Measle dinghy was designed locally and introduced in Skerries in 1960.

BirdWatch Ireland, Fingal branch, gives presentations and arranges outdoor events.

The town also hosts the annual Skerries 100 and Killalane motorcycle races.

== Religion ==
Skerries is a parish in the Fingal North deanery of the Roman Catholic Archdiocese of Dublin. Skerries is served by Holmpatrick St Patrick, Church of Ireland, and Skerries Methodist Church.

== Folklore ==
According to local legend, while living on St Patrick's Island near Skerries, Saint Patrick only had a goat as company. On one occasion, while travelling from the island to convert those on the mainland, the goat was reputedly stolen and eaten. The legend tells that Patrick, in his anger, reached the mainland in two giant steps and took away the people of Skerries' ability to speak, reducing them to shrieking and bleating like goats and it was only when they admitted their crime that their voices returned. The goat is sometimes used as a symbol for Skerries.

== Notable people ==
- Steven Beattie, association footballer
- Bobby Beggs, Gaelic footballer
- Bryan Cullen, Gaelic footballer
- Lyndsey Davey, Gaelic footballer
- David Drumm, former CEO of Anglo Irish Bank
- Jim Fitzpatrick, artist
- Fontaines D.C. lead singer, Grian Chatten
- Ciarán Frawley, rugby player
- Jim Glennon, former rugby player and politician
- Thomas Hand, Irish revolutionary killed in the Irish War of Independence. Hand Street bears his name and there is a commemorative plaque outside his former house on Baltrasna Lane.
- Killian Keane, rugby player
- Caitlín Rebekah Kiernan, author and paleontologist
- D. P. Moran, Irish nationalist writer
- Alan O'Connor, rugby player

== See also ==
- List of abbeys and priories in Ireland (County Dublin)
- List of towns and villages in Ireland
- The Skerries, Isle of Anglesey, a group of rocky islets
