= St Patrick's Island =

Island off the coast of Fingal (County Dublin), Ireland

Native name: Inis Pádraig
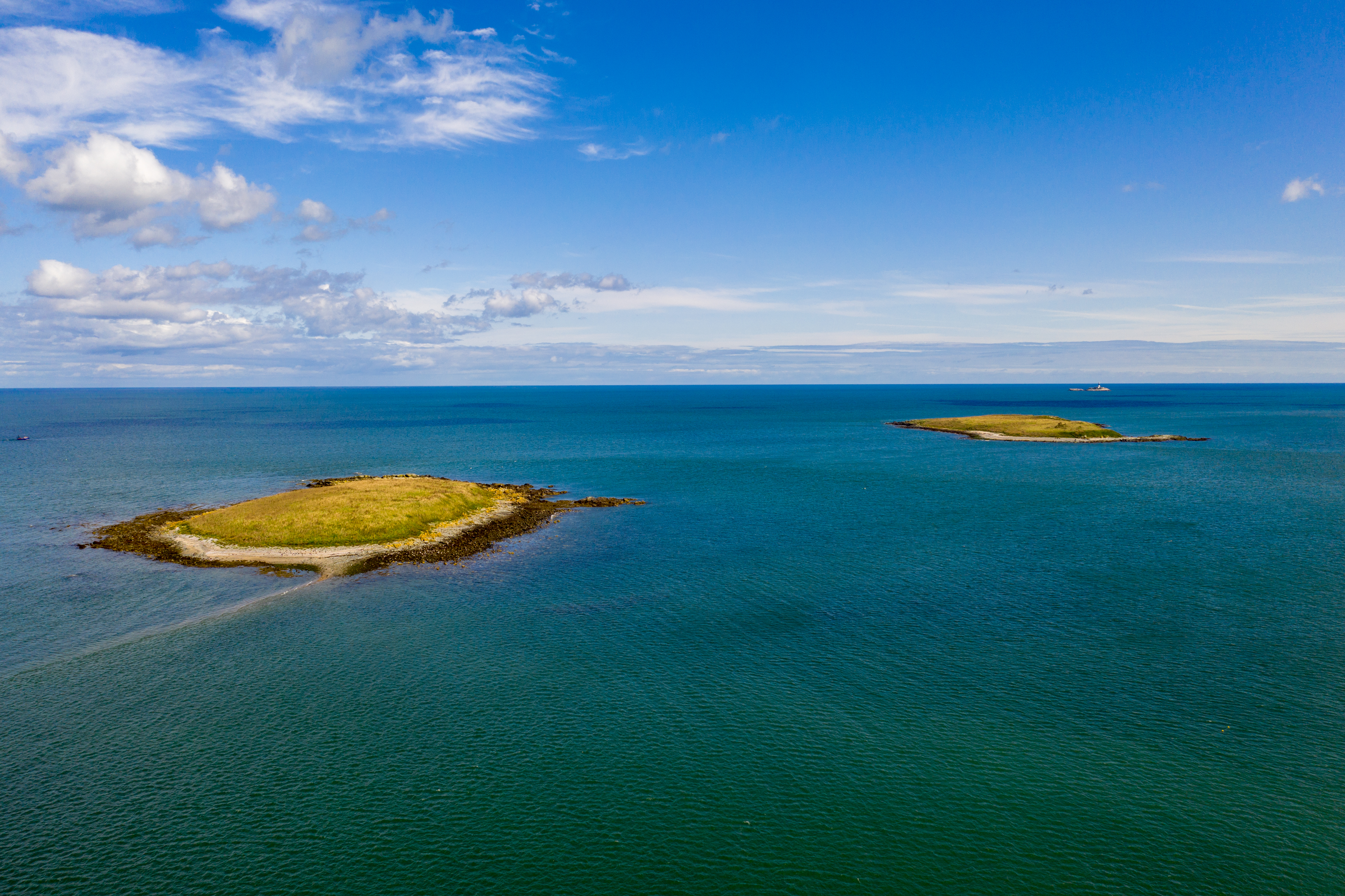
- St Patrick's Island on right in distance

- Location within island of Ireland

Geography
- Location: Irish Sea
- Coordinates: 53°35′07.30″N 6°04′26.14″W
- Archipelago: Skerries

Administration
- Ireland
- Province: Leinster
- County: Dublin

Demographics
- Population: 0

St Patrick's Island (Irish: Inis Pádraig, meaning 'St Patrick's Island') is the most distant of three low-lying uninhabited islets off the headland of Skerries, County Dublin in Ireland. It is an island of low cliffs and lies about 1.5 km from the mainland, with vegetation consisting of grasses, brambles and other species such as hogweed.

It is the most important of the three islands for breeding seabirds. Cormorant, shag and herring gull are the most prominent species.

== History ==
The island is named for Saint Patrick.

A monastery was established on the island which was raided by the Vikings in 798 AD this coming only a few years after initial viking attacks on the nearby Lambay Island in 795 AD.

In 1120 another monastery named for Saint Augustine was established on the island.

In 1148 the Primate Gelasius, Archbishop of Armagh and Papal Legate St. Malachy convened a synod on the island. Fifteen bishops, over two-hundred priests, and many other clergy attended with the intention of reforming the Irish church. The synod is recorded in the continuation of the Annals of the Four Masters, the Annals of Inisfallen, and the continuator of the Annals of Tigernach.

The monastery site was dissolved in 1220 when it moved to Holmpatrick in Skerries.
