= Joseph O'Connor (Irish republican) =

Irish republican and soldier (c.1880–1959)

Joseph John O'Connor (c. 1880 – 23 February 1959) was an Irish republican and soldier.

O'Connor was born in the 1880s and remembered seeing Charles Stewart Parnell as a child. He joined the Irish Volunteers in 1913 and by 1916 he was a captain in command of A Company, 3rd Battalion, Dublin Brigade under Éamon de Valera. When the vice-commandant failed to show for the 1916 Easter Rising, de Valera made O'Connor his second in command. O'Connor remained with his company and de Valera at Boland's Mills until they became the last battalion to surrender. He was imprisoned at Frongoch internment camp in Wales and released in the 1917 amnesty.

Returning to Dublin, O'Connor joined "The Squad" under Michael Collins and killed Captain John FitzGerald of the "Cairo Gang" on Bloody Sunday in 1920. By the end of the Irish War of Independence he was commandant of the 3rd Battalion "Dev's Own". He was a member of the Irish Republican Army's "Banned Convention" in 1922. In the Battle of Dublin during the Irish Civil War he held the Fianna HQ in York Street near St Stephen's Green. He escaped to Limerick and succeeded Ernie O'Malley as the quartermaster-general of the IRA with the rank of brigadier-general.

In October 1922, O'Connor was captured by Free State forces. In October 1923, O'Connor was sent to Mountjoy Prison, where he went on hunger strike. Transferred to Kilmainham Gaol, he finally ended his hunger strike after 40 days. He was eventually released in February 1924. After the Civil War, O'Connor became active in Sinn Féin and later accepted de Valera's invitation to join the National Executive of Fianna Fáil. At the outbreak of World War II, O'Connor suggested to de Valera that a battalion of former IRA men be raised to assist in the defence of Ireland. The 26th Battalion was formed in Dublin, until its stand down in December 1945.

He presented de Valera with a scroll of those killed in the Easter Rising in a 20th-anniversary remembrance ceremony.

O'Connor died in Dublin on 23 February 1959.
