= 1999 Laois County Council election =

Part of the 1999 Irish local elections

← 1991	10 June 1999	2004 →

All 25 seats to Laois County Council
	First party	Second party	Third party
Party	Fianna Fáil	Fine Gael	Independent
Seats won	14	10	1
Seat change	+1	+1	-
	Fourth party	Fifth party
Party	Labour	Progressive Democrats
Seats won	0	0
Seat change	-1	-1
- Map showing the area of Laois County Council
Council control after election
TBD

An election to Laois County Council took place on 10 June 1999 as part of that year's Irish local elections. 25 councillors were elected from five local electoral areas on the system of proportional representation by means of the single transferable vote (PR-STV) for a five-year term of office.

== Results by party ==
Party	Seats	±	First Pref. votes	FPv%	±%
Fianna Fáil	14	+1	12,839	51.20	
Fine Gael	10	+1	8,271	32.98	
Independent	1	-	2,487	9.92	
Labour	0	-1	1,063	4.24	
Progressive Democrats	0	-1	-	-	
Totals	25	-	25,076	100.00	—

== Results by local electoral area ==
=== Borris-in-Ossory ===
Borris-in-Ossory - 7 seats
Party	Candidate	FPv%	Count								
Party	Candidate	FPv%	1	2	3	4	5	6	7	8	9
Fianna Fáil	Kieran Phelan*	17.24	1,347								
Fianna Fáil	Seán Fleming	13.94	1,089								
Fianna Fáil	John Joe Fennelly	12.38	967	1,044							
Fine Gael	Michael Lalor*	11.94	933	939	955	958	1,011				
Fianna Fáil	Martin Rohan*	10.15	793	873	917	963	980				
Fine Gael	Marty Phelan*	8.87	693	720	731	732	856	1,006			
Fine Gael	John Bonham	8.29	648	657	664	666	696	748	777	794	795
Labour	Larry Kavanagh*	7.67	599	615	639	639	663	776	781	793	795
Independent	John King	5.17	404	502	507	515	616				
Fine Gael	Gina O'Loughlin	4.36	341	398	403	410					
Electorate: 12,812 Valid: 7,814 (60.99%) Spoilt: 116 Quota: 977 Turnout: 7,930 (61.90%)

=== Emo ===
Emo - 4 seats
Party	Candidate	FPv%	Count					
Party	Candidate	FPv%	1	2	3	4	5	6
Fine Gael	James Deegan*	17.58	684	692	727	893		
Fianna Fáil	Ray Cribbin*	16.55	644	648	653	673	679	859
Fianna Fáil	Michael Costello	16.45	640	642	643	656	660	768
Independent	Michael Turley	13.83	538	544	566	638	687	803
Independent	Sam Gee	11.51	448	449	453	497	527	550
Fianna Fáil	Theresa Mulhare*	10.85	422	423	429	471	490	
Fine Gael	Mary Lalor	5.24	204	206	209			
Labour	Patrick Fennell	3.34	130	151	194			
Independent	Christine Holohan	3.06	119	129				
Independent	Frank Byrne	1.59	62					
Electorate: 6,813 Valid: 3,891 (57.11%) Spoilt: 68 Quota: 779 Turnout: 3,959 (58.11%)

=== Luggacurren ===
Luggacurren - 4 seats
Party	Candidate	FPv%	Count			
Party	Candidate	FPv%	1	2	3	4
Fine Gael	John Moran*	19.26	718	741	823	
Fianna Fáil	Michael Rice	18.62	694	726	835	
Fine Gael	James Daly*	16.39	611	662	747	
Fianna Fáil	Mary Wheatley*	15.83	590	623	683	737
Fianna Fáil	Dick Miller	12.85	479	489	596	625
Independent	Seamus Martin	6.28	234	252		
Fianna Fáil	Anne Cass	5.77	215	224		
Independent	Michael Leech	4.99	186			
Electorate: 6,845 Valid: 3,727 (54.45%) Spoilt: 48 Quota: 746 Turnout: 3,775 (55.15%)

=== Mountmellick ===
Mountmellick - 4 seats
Party	Candidate	FPv%	Count					
Party	Candidate	FPv%	1	2	3	4	5	6
Fianna Fáil	John Moloney TD*	27.52	1,123					
Fianna Fáil	Seamus McDonald*	17.45	712	870				
Fine Gael	David Goodwin	14.44	589	617	683	873		
Fianna Fáil	Joe Digan*	12.87	525	558	597	731	743	783
Fine Gael	David Conroy	10.98	448	495	586	674	718	731
Fine Gael	Denis Feighery	10.56	431	441	466			
Independent	Pat Bowe	6.18	252	282				
Electorate: 6,000 Valid: 4,080 (68.00%) Spoilt: 66 Quota: 817 Turnout: 4,146 (69.10%)

=== Portlaoise ===
Portlaoise - 6 seats
Party	Candidate	FPv%	Count									
Party	Candidate	FPv%	1	2	3	4	5	6	7	8	9	10
Fianna Fáil	Joe Dunne*	19.05	1,060									
Fine Gael	William Aird*	12.29	684	712	718	730	750	770	850			
Fine Gael	Charles Flanagan TD*	9.45	526	542	545	554	570	574	630	673	706	735
Fianna Fáil	Catherine Fitzgerald	9.35	520	559	563	568	576	593	607	636	639	673
Fine Gael	Mary Sweeney	8.95	498	507	508	515	537	597	641	664	676	702
Sinn Féin	Brian Stanley	7.48	416	422	426	434	461	472	483	540	541	
Fianna Fáil	Jerry Lodge*	7.26	404	445	450	466	477	569	596	624	626	695
Fianna Fáil	Tom Jacob*	6.34	353	420	423	426	440	491	520	559	563	616
Fine Gael	Kathleen O'Brien	4.73	263	271	276	286	297	304				
Fianna Fáil	Anthony Lodge	4.71	262	286	287	290	297					
Independent	Joe McCormack	4.15	231	248	254	268	301	317	339			
Labour	Tom Phelan	3.07	171	174	184	220						
Labour	Brendan Tynan	1.99	111	115	132							
Labour	Seán O'Gorman	0.93	52	53								
Independent	Fred Bannan	0.23	13	15								
Electorate: 9,947 Valid: 5,564 (55.94%) Spoilt: 49 Quota: 795 Turnout: 5,613 (56.43%)
