= 1991 Laois County Council election =

Part of the 1991 Irish local elections

| ← 1985 | 27 June 1991 | 1999 → |

All 25 seats on Laois County Council
| | First party | Second party | Third party |
|---|---|---|---|
| Party | Fianna Fáil | Fine Gael | Labour |
| Seats won | 13 | 9 | 1 |
| Seat change | -1 | - | - |
| | Fourth party | Fifth party |
| Party | Progressive Democrats | Independent |
| Seats won | 1 | 1 |
| Seat change | +1 | - |
- Map showing the area of Laois County Council
Council control before election
Fianna Fáil
Council control after election
Fianna Fáil

An election to Laois County Council took place on 27 June 1991 as part of that year's Irish local elections. 25 councillors were elected from five local electoral areas (LEAs) for a five-year term of office on the electoral system of proportional representation by means of the single transferable vote (PR-STV). This term was extended twice, first to 1998, then to 1999.

== Results by party ==
| Party | Seats | ± | First Pref. votes | FPv% | ±% |
|---|---|---|---|---|---|
| Fianna Fáil | 13 | -1 | 11,454 | 49.33 | |
| Fine Gael | 9 | - | 7,910 | 34.07 | |
| Labour | 1 | - | 1,672 | 7.20 | |
| Progressive Democrats | 1 | +1 | 944 | 4.07 | |
| Independent | 1 | - | 1,239 | 5.34 | |
| Totals | 25 | - | 23,219 | 100.00 | — |

== Results by local electoral area ==
=== Borris-in-Ossory ===
Borris-in-Ossory - 7 seats
| Party | Candidate | FPv% | Count | | | | | | | | |
| Party | Candidate | FPv% | 1 | 2 | 3 | 4 | 5 | 6 | 7 | 8 | 9 |
|---|---|---|---|---|---|---|---|---|---|---|---|
| Fianna Fáil | Liam Hyland TD* | 18.0% | 1,219 | | | | | | | | |
| Independent | Jimmy Kelly* | 12.2% | 828 | 856 | | | | | | | |
| Fianna Fáil | Kieran Phelan | 11.1% | 751 | 816 | 818 | 861 | | | | | |
| Fine Gael | William Mansfield* | 10.7% | 728 | 749 | 751 | 819 | 826 | 898 | | | |
| Labour | Larry Kavanagh | 8.8% | 594 | 617 | 618 | 630 | 631 | 729 | 735 | 844 | 917 |
| Fianna Fáil | Eamon Rafter* | 8.0% | 539 | 590 | 591 | 629 | 633 | 638 | 638 | 726 | 754 |
| Fine Gael | Marty Phelan | 7.0% | 476 | 513 | 513 | 576 | 576 | 601 | 612 | 644 | 902 |
| Fine Gael | Stephen Murphy | 6.11 | 411 | 425 | 425 | 433 | 433 | 455 | 487 | 496 | |
| Fianna Fáil | Thomas Fennelly | 5.8% | 392 | 446 | 447 | 447 | 451 | 457 | 457 | 555 | 624 |
| Fianna Fáil | Fintan Phelan* | 4.4% | 299 | 365 | 366 | 376 | 377 | 412 | 413 | | |
| Fine Gael | Patrick McMahon* | 4.0% | 272 | 276 | 276 | 278 | 278 | | | | |
| Independent | Peter Loughman | 3.9% | 267 | 275 | 275 | | | | | | |
Electorate: 12,812 Valid: 7,814 (60.99%) Spoilt: 116 Quota: 977 Turnout: 7,930 (61.90%)

=== Emo ===
Emo - 4 seats
| Party | Candidate | FPv% | Count | | |
| Party | Candidate | FPv% | 1 | 2 | 3 |
|---|---|---|---|---|---|
| Fianna Fáil | Ray Cribbin* | 27.7% | 1,047 | | |
| Progressive Democrats | Cathy Honan | 17.3% | 652 | 725 | 896 |
| Fine Gael | Jim Buggie* | 16.3% | 616 | 624 | 750 |
| Fianna Fáil | Theresa Mulhare | 15.3% | 579 | 742 | 770 |
| Labour | Paddy Bray | 13.5% | 512 | 515 | 590 |
| Fine Gael | Sam Gee | 6.5% | 245 | 268 | |
| Labour | Anthony Martin | 3.4% | 128 | 149 | |
Electorate: 6,413 Valid: 3,779 (58.93%) Spoilt: 34 Quota: 756 Turnout: 3,813 (59.29%)

=== Luggacurren ===
Luggacurren - 4 seats
| Party | Candidate | FPv% | Count | | | | | |
| Party | Candidate | FPv% | 1 | 2 | 3 | 4 | 5 | 6 |
|---|---|---|---|---|---|---|---|---|
| Fianna Fáil | James Cooney* | 15.9% | 600 | 629 | 758 | | | |
| Fine Gael | John Moran | 15.5% | 585 | 661 | 693 | 843 | | |
| Fianna Fáil | Martin Rohan* | 15.3% | 575 | 581 | 626 | 663 | 667 | 679 |
| Fianna Fáil | Mary Wheatley* | 13.0% | 491 | 538 | 631 | 674 | 678 | 690 |
| Fine Gael | James Daly | 12.7% | 478 | 552 | 575 | 742 | 822 | |
| Fianna Fáil | Mary Redmond | 9.8% | 368 | 382 | | | | |
| Fine Gael | Senator Charles McDonald* | 9.5% | 358 | 394 | 431 | | | |
| Labour | Tony O'Brien | 7.9% | 299 | | | | | |
| Independent | Thomas McCormack | 0.4% | 16 | | | | | |
Electorate: 5,972 Valid: 3,770 (63.13%) Spoilt: 35 Quota: 755 Turnout: 3,805 (63.71%)

=== Portlaoise ===
Portlaoise - 5 seats
| Party | Candidate | FPv% | Count | | | | | | | | | |
| Party | Candidate | FPv% | 1 | 2 | 3 | 4 | 5 | 6 | 7 | 8 | 9 | 10 |
|---|---|---|---|---|---|---|---|---|---|---|---|---|
| Fianna Fáil | Joe Dunne* | 30.5% | 1,316 | | | | | | | | | |
| Fine Gael | William Aird* | 14.5% | 625 | 684 | 685 | 698 | 741 | | | | | |
| Fine Gael | Tom Keenan* | 14.5% | 624 | 686 | 688 | 711 | 747 | | | | | |
| Fianna Fáil | Tom Jacob | 7.3% | 314 | 489 | 489 | 500 | 517 | 519 | 521 | 534 | 559 | 703 |
| Fianna Fáil | Jerry Lodge* | 7.1% | 304 | 436 | 436 | 450 | 466 | 472 | 476 | 518 | 549 | 678 |
| Progressive Democrats | Assumpta Broomfield | 6.8% | 292 | 314 | 314 | 325 | 338 | 343 | 346 | 397 | 464 | 493 |
| Fianna Fáil | John Fitzgibbon | 5.9% | 254 | 331 | 331 | 338 | 341 | 341 | 342 | 350 | 373 | |
| Fine Gael | Ger O'Donoghue | 4.3% | 187 | 198 | 198 | 205 | 221 | 233 | 246 | 267 | | |
| Labour | Tom Phelan | 3.2% | 139 | 151 | 151 | 178 | 184 | 186 | 188 | | | |
| Fine Gael | Anthony Dunne | 3.0% | 129 | 150 | 152 | 165 | | | | | | |
| Independent | Joe McCormack | 2.8% | 120 | 145 | 149 | | | | | | | |
| Independent | Joseph Bannan | 0.2% | 8 | 9 | | | | | | | | |
Electorate: 7,588 Valid: 4,312 (56.83%) Spoilt: 24 Quota: 719 Turnout: 4,336 (57.14%)

=== Tinnahinch ===
Tinnahinch - 5 seats
| Party | Candidate | FPv% | Count | | | |
| Party | Candidate | FPv% | 1 | 2 | 3 | 4 |
|---|---|---|---|---|---|---|
| Fianna Fáil | John Moloney* | 26.6% | 1,217 | | | |
| Fine Gael | Michael Lalor | 15.4% | 704 | 719 | 725 | 872 |
| Fianna Fáil | Seamus McDonald* | 14.6% | 671 | 911 | | |
| Fine Gael | Charles Flanagan TD* | 14.6% | 670 | 761 | 780 | |
| Fianna Fáil | Joe Digan* | 11.3% | 518 | 584 | 694 | 785 |
| Fine Gael | David Goodwin* | 10.1% | 462 | 498 | 509 | 594 |
| Fine Gael | William Daly | 7.4% | 340 | 345 | 346 | |
Electorate: 6,381 Valid: 4,582 (71.81%) Spoilt: 44 Quota: 764 Turnout: 4,626 (72.5%)
