= 2019 Laois County Council election =

Part of the 2019 Irish local elections

- 24 May 2019

All 19 seats on Laois County Council 10 seats needed for a majority
	First party	Second party	Third party
Party	Fine Gael	Fianna Fáil	Sinn Féin
Seats won	7	6	2
Seat change	▲1	▼1	Steady
	Fourth party	Fifth party
Party	Labour	Independent
Seats won	1	3
Seat change	Steady	Steady
- Results by local electoral area

An election to all 19 seats on Laois County Council was held on 24 May 2019 as part of the 2019 Irish local elections. County Laois was divided into 3 local electoral areas (LEAs) to elect councillors for a five-year term of office on the electoral system of proportional representation by means of the single transferable vote (PR-STV).

== Boundary review ==
Following a recommendation of the 2018 LEA boundary review committee, the electoral division of Clash was moved from Portlaoise LEA to Borris-in-Ossory–Mountmellick LEA, to take account of population changes revealed by the 2016 census.

== Results by party ==
Party	Seats	±	1st pref	FPv%	±%
Fine Gael	7	▲1	9,578	29.64	▼0.56
Fianna Fáil	6	▼1	10,355	32.05	▼0.75
Sinn Féin	2	Steady	3,604	11.15	▼1.55
Labour	1	Steady	1,797	5.56	▲0.86
Renua	0	Steady	514	1.59	New
Independent	3	Steady	6,461	20.00	▲1.20
Total	19	Steady	32,309	100.00	

== Results by local electoral area ==
*: Outgoing councillor elected in 2014.
†: Outgoing councillor coopted subsequent to the 2014 election.

=== Borris-in-Ossory–Mountmellick ===
Borris-in-Ossory–Mountmellick: 6 seats
Party	Candidate	FPv%	Count									
Party	Candidate	FPv%	1	2	3	4	5	6	7	8	9	10
Independent	James Kelly	12.72%	1,517	1,576	1,606	1,629	1,648	1,811				
Fianna Fáil	Paddy Bracken	11.86%	1,414	1,418	1,500	1,565	1,752					
Fine Gael	John King	10.51%	1,254	1,258	1,259	1,261	1,274	1,314	1,351	1,355	1,357	1,532
Independent	Ollie Clooney	9.47%	1,129	1,136	1,149	1,161	1,171	1,219	1,304	1,331	1,334	1,405
Fianna Fáil	Séamus McDonald	9.13%	1,089	1,095	1,116	1,332	1,395	1,535	1,671	1,695	1,710	
Independent	Brendan Phelan	7.81%	931	953	964	970	976	1,056	1,166	1,185	1,187	1,273
Fine Gael	Conor Bergin	7.76%	925	949	953	962	1,042	1,091	1,165	1,190	1,199	1,548
Fine Gael	David Goodwin	6.92%	825	831	843	916	1,057	1,088	1,150	1,152	1,169	
Sinn Féin	Lorna Holohan Garry	5.44%	649	668	741	790	819	841				
Fianna Fáil	Liam O'Neill	4.82%	575	587	594	624	637					
Fine Gael	Fergal Conroy	4.69%	559	561	594	621						
Fianna Fáil	Declan Good	4.54%	542	549	554							
Independent	Brian Furlong	2.73%	326	331								
Independent	Ger Hogan	1.61%	192									
Electorate: 20,704 Valid: 11,927 Spoilt: 168 Quota: 1,704 Turnout: 12,095 (58.42%)

=== Graiguecullen–Portarlington ===
Graiguecullen–Portarlington: 6 seats
Party	Candidate	FPv%	Count						
Party	Candidate	FPv%	1	2	3	4	5	6	7
Fianna Fáil	Padraig Fleming	17.33%	1,761						
Sinn Féin	Aidan Mullins	15.88%	1,614						
Fine Gael	Tom Mulhall (Note: See change below.)	15.19%	1,544						
Fianna Fáil	Paschal McEvoy	13.93%	1,416	1,495					
Independent	Ben Brennan	12.50%	1,270	1,350	1,387	1,392	1,433	1,445	1,525
Fine Gael	Aisling Moran	8.81%	895	964	972	995	1,031	1,047	1,398
Labour	Eoin Barry	7.44%	756	792	826	833	880	882	998
Fine Gael	Vivienne Phelan	5.33%	542	566	586	625	737	749	
Fianna Fáil	Deirdre Ó Connell-Hopkins	3.59%	365	386	449	467			
Electorate: 20,541 Valid: 10,163 Spoilt: 147 Quota: 1,452 Turnout: 10,310 (50.19%)

=== Portlaoise ===
Portlaoise: 7 seats
Party	Candidate	FPv%	Count													
Party	Candidate	FPv%	1	2	3	4	5	6	7	8	9	10	11	12	13	14
Fine Gael	William Aird	15.39%	1,573													
Fianna Fáil	John Joe Fennelly	14.25%	1,456													
Sinn Féin	Caroline Dwane-Stanley	11.84%	1,210	1,229	1,241	1,252	1,334									
Fianna Fáil	Catherine Fitzgerald	10.57%	1,080	1,129	1,166	1,173	1,177	1,180	1,184	1,206	1,288					
Labour	Noel Tuohy	10.19%	1,041	1,073	1,080	1,106	1,116	1,122	1,135	1,170	1,244	1,284				
Fine Gael	Mary Sweeney	10.02%	1,024	1,100	1,159	1,178	1,189	1,195	1,211	1,213	1,251	1,269	1,271	1,369		
Independent	Naeem Iqbal	4.44%	454	456	458	468	468	472	477	493	503	590	591	628	638	
Fine Gael	Thomasina Connell	4.28%	437	503	516	519	525	527	533	535	567	612	613	679	703	796
Renua	Dominic Dunne	3.71%	379	395	401	411	415	419	493	511	542	558	559	636	654	743
Independent	Timothy Adejumo	3.55%	363	365	368	374	374	381	383	401	411					
Fianna Fáil	Donal Kelly	3.24%	331	342	354	359	359	362	369	381	443	466	471			
Fianna Fáil	Pauline Madigan	3.19%	326	339	354	355	355	356	359	366						
Independent	Tom Duffy	1.51%	154	155	156	164	167	172	173							
Renua	Noel O'Rourke	1.32%	135	137	140	148	150	151								
Sinn Féin	John Gormley	1.28%	131	134	140	141										
Independent	Judith Preston-Grace	1.22%	125	128	130											
Electorate: 21,162 Valid: 10,219 Spoilt: 151 Quota: 1,278 Turnout: 10,370 (49%)

== Results by gender ==
2019 Laois County Council election Candidates by gender
Gender	Number of candidates	% of candidates	Elected councillors	% of councillors
Men	29	74.4%	14	73.7%
Women	10	25.6%	5	26.3%
TOTAL	39		19	

== Changes ==
=== Co-options ===
Party	Outgoing	LEA	Reason	Date	Co-optee
Fine Gael	Tom Mulhall	Graiguecullen–Portarlington	Retirement	January 2021	P. J. Kelly
Fine Gael	Mary Sweeney	Portlaoise	Retirement	December 2021	Barry Walsh
Labour	Noel Tuohy	Portlaoise	Retirement	February 2023	Marie Tuohy

=== Changes in affiliation ===
Name	LEA	Elected as	New affiliation	Date
Aisling Moran	Graiguecullen-Portarlington	Fine Gael	Independent	2 May 2023
