= 2009 Laois County Council election =

Part of the 2009 Irish local elections

← 2004	5 June 2009	2014 →

All 25 seats on Laois County Council
	First party	Second party	Third party
Party	Fine Gael	Fianna Fáil	Labour
Seats won	12	8	1
Seat change	+3	-3	-
	Fourth party	Fifth party	Sixth party
Party	Sinn Féin	Independent	Progressive Democrats
Seats won	1	3	0
Seat change	-	+1	-1
- Map showing the area of Laois County Council
Council control after election
TBD

An election to Laois County Council took place on 5 June 2009 as part of that year's Irish local elections. 25 councillors were elected from five local electoral areas (LEAs) for a five-year term of office on the electoral system of proportional representation by means of the single transferable vote (PR-STV).

== Results by party ==
Party	Seats	±	First Pref. votes	FPv%	±%
Fine Gael	12	+3	13,175	38.29	
Fianna Fáil	8	-3	11,658	33.88	
Labour	1	-	2,007	5.83	
Sinn Féin	1	-	2,810	8.17	
Independent	3	+1	4,711	13.69	
Progressive Democrats	0	-1			
Totals	25	-	34,409	100.00	—

== Results by local electoral area ==
=== Borris-in-Ossory ===
Borris-in-Ossory - 6 seats
Party	Candidate	FPv%	Count						
Party	Candidate	FPv%	1	2	3	4	5	6	7
Fianna Fáil	John Joe Fennelly*	19.87	1,758						
Fine Gael	Michael Lalor*	15.06	1,332						
Fine Gael	John King	11.42	1,010	753	756	842	853	880	899
Fianna Fáil	Brendan Phelan*	11.00	973	1,109	1,110	1,190			
Fine Gael	John Bonham*	9.69	857	954	955	976	986	1,056	1,191
Fine Gael	Marty Phelan*	10.94	968	1,008	1,009	1,041	1,069	1,111	1,191
Fianna Fáil	Michael Phelan	8.68	768	886	886	903	906	984	1,001
Labour	Raymond Fitzpatrick	5.35	473	508	508	542	546	646	
Sinn Féin	Aaron Delaney	5.30	469	498	499	531	536		
Independent	M.J. Walsh	2.61	231	247	248				
Christian Solidarity	Colm Callanan	0.09	8	10					
Electorate: 14,167 Valid: 8,847 (62.45%) Spoilt: 109 Quota: 1,264 Turnout: 8,956 (63.22%)

=== Emo ===
Emo - 4 seats
Party	Candidate	FPv%	Count							
Party	Candidate	FPv%	1	2	3	4	5	6	7	8
Fine Gael	Tom Mulhall	13.41	747	747	821	837	939	991	1,066	1,091
Independent	Paul Mitchell	12.10	674	676	701	772	829	960	983	1,102
Fianna Fáil	Ray Cribbin*	11.08	617	617	625	644	673	694	832	1,191
Sinn Féin	Aidan Mullins	10.25	571	573	583	615	636	753	799	895
Fine Gael	James Deegan*	10.16	566	567	647	661	767	831	964	992
Fianna Fáil	Willie Murphy	9.66	538	538	541	562	572	610	709	
Fianna Fáil	Paschal McEvoy	8.99	501	501	504	508	588	604		
Independent	Tom Cushen	7.68	428	428	434	460				
Labour	Margaret Guijt Lawlor	7.20	401	401	428	484	505			
Fine Gael	Winifred Champ Cox	4.63	258	258						
Independent	Frances Emerson	4.63	258	260	280					
Christian Solidarity	Colm Callanan	4.63	11							
Electorate: 8,110 Valid: 4,847 (59.77%) Spoilt: 82 Quota: 970 Turnout: 4,929 (60.78%)

=== Luggacurren ===
Luggacurren - 4 seats
Party	Candidate	FPv%	Count					
Party	Candidate	FPv%	1	2	3	4	5	6
Fine Gael	James Daly*	20.98	1,179					
Fine Gael	John Moran*	20.68	1,162					
Fianna Fáil	Dick Miller*	14.10	792	801	817	831	839	957
Fianna Fáil	Padraig Fleming	14.04	789	801	840	875	886	1,148
Fianna Fáil	Laurence Phelan	12.62	709	716	728	745	753	
Independent	Ben Brennan	10.43	586	598	677	770	781	1,025
Independent	Nuala Finnegan	2.94	165	171	208			
Sinn Féin	Marie Johnston	2.63	148	154				
Independent	James Scully	1.42	80	83				
Christian Solidarity	Colm Callanan	0.16	9					
Electorate: 9,045 Valid: 5,619 (62.12%) Spoilt: 66 Quota: 1,124 Turnout: 5,685 (62.85%)

=== Mountmellick ===
Mountmellick - 4 seats
Party	Candidate	FPv%	Count							
Party	Candidate	FPv%	1	2	3	4	5	6	7	8
Fianna Fáil	Paddy Bracken*	15.37	928	944	983	987	1,011	1,156	1,263	
Fine Gael	David Goodwin*	13.85	836	849	855	974	1,107	1,178	1,488	
Fianna Fáil	Seamus McDonald*	12.69	766	776	836	848	941	1,006	1,063	1,083
Labour	Pat Bowe	11.69	706	741	751	764	796	923	1,064	1,185
Independent	Michael Gormley	8.66	523	549	585	590	622			
Fianna Fáil	Joe Digan	8.55	516	522	560	607	774	789	799	809
Independent	Patrick Delaney	8.08	488	500	515	579				
Fine Gael	Rosemary Whelan	7.16	432	452	485	601	649	780		
Fine Gael	Pat Lalor	6.73	406	410	426					
Fianna Fáil	Talitha Horan	4.24	256	264						
Sinn Féin	Adam Haughton	2.75	166							
Christian Solidarity	Colm Callanan	0.23	14							
Electorate: 9,255 Valid: 6,037 (65.23%) Spoilt: 70 Quota: 1,208 Turnout: 6,107 (65.99%)

=== Portlaoise ===
Portlaoise - 7 seats
Party	Candidate	FPv%	Count										
Party	Candidate	FPv%	1	2	3	4	5	6	7	8	9	10	11
Fine Gael	William Aird*	17.81	1,485										
Sinn Féin	Brian Stanley*	17.46	1,456										
Fianna Fáil	Jerry Lodge*	7.96	663	683	712	756	773	896	922	1,005	1,067		
Independent	Rotimi Adebari	7.78	649	662	711	720	733	750	835	891	934	942	946
Fine Gael	Mary Sweeney*	7.75	646	706	756	769	785	831	898	976	1,129		
Fianna Fáil	Catherine Fitzgerald*	6.85	571	599	620	639	653	785	814	860	901	914	921
Fine Gael	Kathleen O'Brien	5.31	443	509	540	551	566	587	647	756	906	946	953
Fine Gael	Paddy Buggy	5.22	435	527	562	571	589	615	676	740	877	903	910
Labour	Jim O'Brien	5.13	427	441	492	501	522	533					
Independent	Tom Jacob*	5.08	424	465	497	515	530	560	621				
Fine Gael	Matthew Keegan	4.96	413	491	521	533	542	579	622	697			
Fianna Fáil	Liam Phelan	4.77	397	413	453	481	493						
Independent	Michael Moloney*	1.76	147	154	166	178							
Fianna Fáil	Tony Walsh	1.39	116	118	123								
Independent	Joe McCormack	0.70	58	63	89								
Christian Solidarity	Colm Callanan	0.07	6	6	8								
Electorate: 15,512 Valid: 8,340 (53.76%) Spoilt: 88 Quota: 1,034 Turnout: 8,428 (54.33%)
