= 2024 Laois County Council election =

Part of the 2024 Irish local elections

- 7 June 2024

All 19 seats on Laois County Council 10 seats needed for a majority
	First party	Second party	Third party
Party	Fianna Fáil	Fine Gael	Sinn Féin
Seats won	6	5	2
Seat change	Steady	▼2	Steady
	Fourth party	Fifth party
Party	Labour	Independent
Seats won	1	5
Seat change	Steady	▲2
- Area of Laois County Council

An election to all 19 seats on Laois County Council was held on 7 June 2024 as part of the 2024 Irish local elections. County Laois is divided into 3 local electoral areas (LEAs) to elect councillors for a five-year term of office on the electoral system of proportional representation by means of the single transferable vote (PR-STV).

== Results by party ==
Party	Seats	±	1st pref	FPv%	±%
Fianna Fáil	6	Steady	10,087	29.02	▼3.03
Fine Gael	5	▼2	8,802	25.32	▼4.32
Sinn Féin	2	Steady	4,831	13.90	▲2.75
Labour	1	Steady	1,237	3.55	▼2.01
Independent Ireland	0	Steady	915	2.63	New
Green	0	Steady	630	1.81	New
Aontú	0	Steady	182	0.52	New
Independent	5	▲2	8,066	23.21	▲3.21
Total	19	Steady	34,750	100.00	

== Results by local electoral area ==
*: Outgoing councillor elected in 2019.
†: Outgoing councillor coopted subsequent to the 2019 election.

=== Borris-in-Ossory–Mountmellick ===
Borris-in-Ossory–Mountmellick: 6 seats
Party	Candidate	FPv%	Count									
Party	Candidate	FPv%	1	2	3	4	5	6	7	8	9	10
Fine Gael	Conor Bergin	13.41%	1,606	1,614	1,628	1,659	1,665	1,684	1,813			
Fianna Fáil	Paddy Bracken	12.12%	1,452	1,457	1,470	1,472	1,501	1,515	1,550	1,562	1,620	1,753
Independent	James Kelly	11.75%	1,408	1,416	1,433	1,497	1,506	1,536	1,740			
Fine Gael	John King	11.29%	1,353	1,359	1,363	1,366	1,371	1,413	1,427	1,440	1,675	1,711
Independent	Ollie Clooney	10.39%	1,245	1,258	1,275	1,310	1,312	1,332	1,379	1,402	1,524	1,650
Fine Gael	Paddy Buggy	9.27%	1,111	1,122	1,137	1,141	1,191	1,194	1,201	1,209	1,213	1,284
Fianna Fáil	Seamus McDonald	9.11%	1,091	1,094	1,101	1,103	1,211	1,214	1,269	1,277	1,365	1,460
Fianna Fáil	Brian Phelan	4.88%	585	594	602	603	609	636	687	700		
Fianna Fáil	Fintan Cuddy	4.72%	566	568	573	588	596	601				
Sinn Féin	Lorna Holohan Garry	3.78%	453	458	475	477	507	754	774	778	800	
Sinn Féin	Helen Campion	3.5%	419	425	430	438	411					
Fianna Fáil	Declan Good	2.32%	278	279	280	284						
Independent	Kevin Drennan	1.60%	192	195	198							
Green	Fiona Dunne	1.01%	121	136								
Labour	Bryan Corrigan	0.83%	99									
Electorate: 21,812 Valid: 11,979 Spoilt: 147 Quota: 1,712 Turnout: 12,126 (55.59%)

=== Graiguecullen–Portarlington ===
Graiguecullen–Portarlington: 6 seats
Party	Candidate	FPv%	Count									
Party	Candidate	FPv%	1	2	3	4	5	6	7	8	9	10
Independent	Ben Brennan	12.17%	1,350	1,357	1,492	1,499	1,666					
Fianna Fáil	Padraig Fleming	11.49%	1,275	1,287	1,371	1,433	1,483	1,511	1,520	1,708		
Fianna Fáil	Paschal McEvoy	12.64%	1,402	1,414	1,427	1,534	1,666					
Sinn Féin	Aidan Mullins	12.25%	1,359	1,371	1,394	1,597						
Independent	Aisling Moran	10.29%	1,142	1,156	1,220	1,233	1,335	1,347	1,401	1,633		
Fine Gael	P.J Kelly	8.99%	997	1,012	1,035	1,140	1,164	1,168	1,171	1,197	1,226	1,240
Fine Gael	Vivienne Phelan	7.26%	806	835	890	957	1,049	1,080	1,087	1,175	1,224	1,257
Sinn Féin	Aaron Kelly	7.07%	785	796	865	869	911	916	923			
Independent Ireland	Patsy Fennell	6.15%	682	690	708	722						
Fianna Fáil	Joey Kennedy	5.21%	578	607	625							
Labour	Eoin Barry	4.56%	506	557								
Green	Charlie Hackett	1.93%	214									
Electorate: 22,233 Valid: 11,096 Spoilt: 133 Quota: 1,586 Turnout: 11,299 (50.51%)

=== Portlaoise ===
Portlaoise: 7 seats
Party	Candidate	FPv%	Count													
Party	Candidate	FPv%	1	2	3	4	5	6	7	8	9	10	11	12	13	14
Fine Gael	William Aird	13.04%	1,540													
Sinn Féin	Caroline Dwane-Stanley	11.98%	1,415	1,420	1,460											
Fianna Fáil	John Joe Fennelly	9.71%	1,147	1,153	1,170	1,180	1,188	1,273	1,325	1,378	1,389	1,398	1,426	1,440	1,446	1,521
Independent	Tommy Mulligan	9.31%	1,099	1,108	1,117	1,144	1,197	1,209	1,227	1,276	1,303	1,339	1,445	1,643		
Fianna Fáil	Catherine Fitzgerald	9.22%	1,089	1,103	1,103	1,112	1,123	1,129	1,144	1,152	1,165	1,181	1,223	1,309	1,324	1,489
Fine Gael	Barry Walsh	7.19%	849	858	861	866	880	912	940	974	979	1,004	1,042	1,046	1,075	1,101
Labour	Marie Tuohy	5.35%	632	637	646	658	671	690	751	757	797	850	899	1,003	1,042	1,119
Fianna Fáil	Naeem Iqbal	5.28%	624	625	626	629	631	632	640	641	700	711	721	752	765	
Fine Gael	Thomasina Connell	4.75%	540	556	561	565	578	584	603	613	658	681	712	762	782	884
Independent	Pauline Flanagan	3.29%	389	392	395	407	439	454	473	510	531	570	677			
Independent	Bolaji Adeyanju	2.92%	345	345	345	348	353	360	377	385						
Independent	Dom Dunne	2.88%	340	344	358	367	399	327	432	477	508	542				
Green	Rosie Palmer	2.5%	295	296	302	305	307	313								
Sinn Féin	Maria McCormack	2.34%	276	277	218	325	332	339	360	387	418					
Independent	Noel Burke	2.23%	263	265	274	281	290									
Independent	Donal Kelly	2.07%	244	246	248	271										
Independent Ireland	Colette Byrne	1.97%	233	234	237	258	294	325	352							
Aontú	Martha Ryan	1.54%	182	183	187											
Sinn Féin	Jason Phelan	1.05%	124	124												
Independent	John Cowhig	0.41%	49	49												
Electorate: 24,426 Valid: 11,675 Spoilt: 133 Quota: 1,460 Turnout: 11,808 (48.34%)

== Changes ==
=== Co-options ===
Party	Outgoing	LEA	Reason	Date	Co-optee
Fine Gael	William Aird	Portlaoise	Elected to 34th Dáil at the 2024 general election	8 December 2024	Paddy Buggy
Fianna Fáil	Pádraig Fleming	Graiguecullen–Portarlington	Retirement	1 April 2026	Elva Kelly

=== Changes in affiliation ===
Name	LEA	Elected as	New affiliation	Date
Aidan Mullins	Graiguecullen–Portarlington	Sinn Féin	Independent	28 August 2024
Caroline Dwane-Stanley	Portlaoise	Sinn Féin	Independent	27 December 2024
