= William Aird =

William Aird may refer to:

- William Aird (Cumann na nGaedheal politician), who served from 1927 to 1931
- William Aird (Fine Gael politician), elected in 2024
