= Maria McCormack =

Irish politician

Senator Maria McCormack
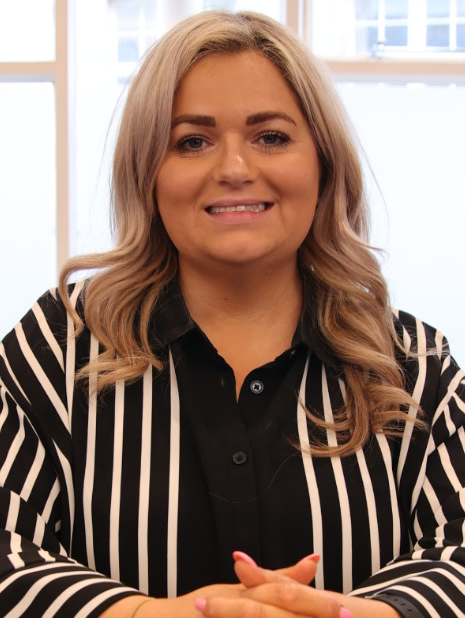
- McCormack in 2025

Senator
- Incumbent
- Assumed office January 2025
- Constituency: Labour Panel

Personal details
- Party: Sinn Féin

Maria McCormack is an Irish Sinn Féin politician who has been a senator for the Labour Panel since January 2025.

== Personal life ==
McCormack is from the town of Ballyroan, County Laois. She is settled in Portlaoise where she lives with her husband and family.

== Political career ==
She was an unsuccessful candidate for the Portlaoise local electoral area in Laois County Council at the 2024 local elections. McCormack was selected as the Sinn Féin candidate for the Laois constituency at the 2024 general election, replacing TD Brian Stanley who resigned from Sinn Féin earlier that year over an internal dispute. McCormack was not elected to the Dáil at the 2024 general election.

She was elected to Seanad Éireann for the Labour Panel at the 2025 Seanad election.
