= Seán Fleming =

Irish politician (born 1958)

Seán Fleming TD
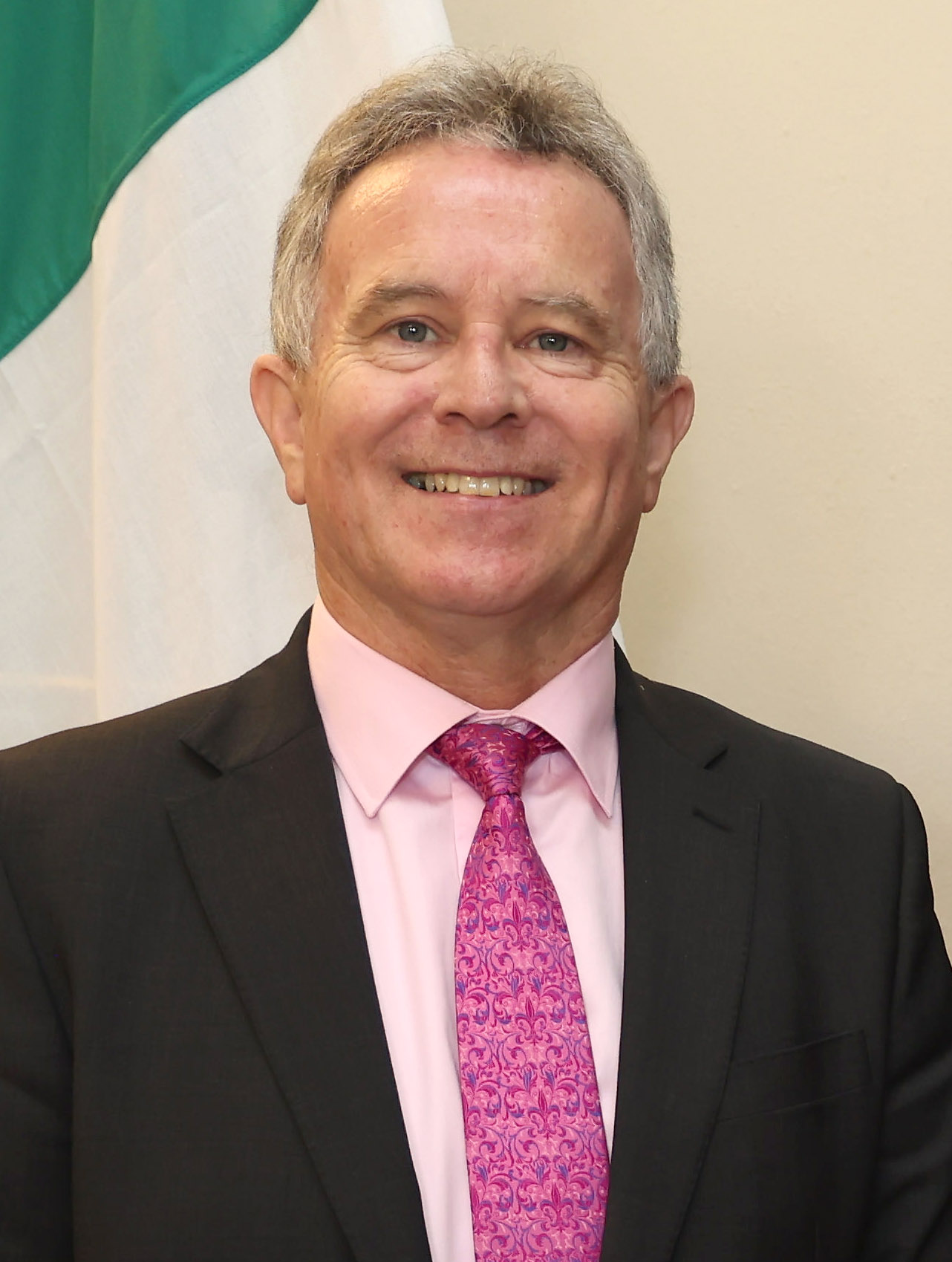
- Fleming in 2024

Teachta Dála
- Incumbent
- Assumed office November 2024
- In office February 2016 – February 2020
- Constituency: Laois
- In office February 2020 – November 2024
- In office June 1997 – February 2016
- Constituency: Laois–Offaly

Minister of State
- 2022–2025: Foreign Affairs
- 2020–2022: Finance

Chair of the Public Accounts Committee
- In office 4 April 2016 – 15 July 2020
- Preceded by: John McGuinness
- Succeeded by: Brian Stanley

Personal details
- Born: 27 February 1958 (age 68) Portlaoise, County Laois, Ireland
- Party: Fianna Fáil
- Spouse: Mary Fleming (m. 1992)
- Children: 1
- Education: University College Dublin

Seán Fleming (born 27 February 1958) is an Irish Fianna Fáil politician who has served as a Teachta Dála (TD) since 1997 (for the Laois constituency since 2024, and previously from 2016 to 2020 and for Laois–Offaly constituency from 2020 to 2024, and previously from 1997 to 2016). He served as Minister of State at the Department of Foreign Affairs from December 2022 to January 2025, and as Minister of State at the Department of Finance from July 2020 to December 2022. He served as Chair of the Public Accounts Committee from 2016 to 2020.

== Political career ==
Fleming is an accountant by profession. He was educated at University College Dublin. Fleming was first elected to Dáil Éireann at the 1997 general election and retained his seat at the 2002, 2007, 2011, 2016 and 2020 general elections. He was formerly Financial Director of Fianna Fáil at national level.

He was elected at the 1999 local elections as a member of Laois County Council for the Borris-in-Ossory local electoral area.

He served as Opposition Spokesperson for Public Expenditure and Reform from 2011 to 2016. He was previously the Chair of the Public Accounts Committee from 2016 to 2020.

On 15 July 2020, he was appointed as Minister of State at the Department of Finance, with special responsibility for Financial Services, Credit Unions and Insurance.

Fleming received criticism from opposition parties in February 2022 when, amid a 20 year high in inflation, he suggested that people should stop complaining about their finances, stating "[r]ather than just complaining and [asking] 'What's the Government going to do for me?', you can actually have a serious impact on your own finance, but it involves people having to do some work themselves." He later apologised for his comments.

In December 2022, he was appointed as Minister of State at the Department of Foreign Affairs with special responsibility for International Development and Diaspora following the appointment of Leo Varadkar as Taoiseach. He was not re-appointed as a minister of state in 2025, but was appointed Cathaoirleach of the Committee on Infrastructure and National Development Plan Delivery.

Political offices
Preceded by Jack Chambers	Minister of State at the Department of Finance; 2020–2022	Succeeded by Jennifer Carroll MacNeill
Preceded by Colm Brophy	Minister of State at the Department of Foreign Affairs; 2022–2025	Succeeded by Neale Richmond

Dáil	Election	Deputy (Party)	Deputy (Party)	Deputy (Party)	Deputy (Party)	Deputy (Party)
2nd	1921	Joseph Lynch (SF)	Patrick McCartan (SF)	Francis Bulfin (SF)	Kevin O'Higgins (SF)	4 seats 1921–1923
3rd	1922	William Davin (Lab)	Patrick McCartan (PT-SF)	Francis Bulfin (PT-SF)	Kevin O'Higgins (PT-SF)	4 seats 1921–1923
4th	1923	William Davin (Lab)	Laurence Brady (Rep)	Francis Bulfin (CnaG)	Patrick Egan (CnaG)	Seán McGuinness (Rep)
4th	1926 by-election	William Davin (Lab)	Laurence Brady (Rep)	Francis Bulfin (CnaG)	Patrick Egan (CnaG)	James Dwyer (CnaG)
5th	1927 (Jun)	William Davin (Lab)	Patrick Boland (FF)	Thomas Tynan (FF)	John Gill (Lab)	James Dwyer (CnaG)
6th	1927 (Sep)	William Davin (Lab)	Patrick Boland (FF)	Patrick Gorry (FF)	William Aird (CnaG)	James Dwyer (CnaG)
7th	1932	William Davin (Lab)	Patrick Boland (FF)	Patrick Gorry (FF)	Thomas F. O'Higgins (CnaG)	Eugene O'Brien (CnaG)
8th	1933	William Davin (Lab)	Patrick Boland (FF)	Eamon Donnelly (FF)	Thomas F. O'Higgins (CnaG)	Jack Finlay (NCP)
9th	1937	William Davin (Lab)	Patrick Boland (FF)	Patrick Gorry (FF)	Thomas F. O'Higgins (FG)	Jack Finlay (FG)
10th	1938	William Davin (Lab)	Patrick Boland (FF)	Patrick Gorry (FF)	Thomas F. O'Higgins (FG)	Daniel Hogan (FF)
11th	1943	William Davin (Lab)	Patrick Boland (FF)	Patrick Gorry (FF)	Thomas F. O'Higgins (FG)	Oliver J. Flanagan (IMR)
12th	1944	William Davin (Lab)	Patrick Boland (FF)	Patrick Gorry (FF)	Thomas F. O'Higgins (FG)	Oliver J. Flanagan (IMR)
13th	1948	William Davin (Lab)	Patrick Boland (FF)	Patrick Gorry (FF)	Tom O'Higgins, Jnr (FG)	Oliver J. Flanagan (Ind.)
14th	1951	William Davin (Lab)	Patrick Boland (FF)	Peadar Maher (FF)	Tom O'Higgins, Jnr (FG)	Oliver J. Flanagan (Ind.)
15th	1954	William Davin (Lab)	Nicholas Egan (FF)	Peadar Maher (FF)	Tom O'Higgins, Jnr (FG)	Oliver J. Flanagan (FG)
15th	1956 by-election	Kieran Egan (FF)	Nicholas Egan (FF)	Peadar Maher (FF)	Tom O'Higgins, Jnr (FG)	Oliver J. Flanagan (FG)
16th	1957	Kieran Egan (FF)	Nicholas Egan (FF)	Peadar Maher (FF)	Tom O'Higgins, Jnr (FG)	Oliver J. Flanagan (FG)
17th	1961	Kieran Egan (FF)	Nicholas Egan (FF)	Patrick Lalor (FF)	Tom O'Higgins, Jnr (FG)	Oliver J. Flanagan (FG)
18th	1965	Henry Byrne (Lab)	Nicholas Egan (FF)	Patrick Lalor (FF)	Tom O'Higgins, Jnr (FG)	Oliver J. Flanagan (FG)
19th	1969	Ger Connolly (FF)	Bernard Cowen (FF)	Patrick Lalor (FF)	Tom Enright (FG)	Oliver J. Flanagan (FG)
20th	1973	Ger Connolly (FF)	Charles McDonald (FG)	Patrick Lalor (FF)	Tom Enright (FG)	Oliver J. Flanagan (FG)
21st	1977	Ger Connolly (FF)	Bernard Cowen (FF)	Patrick Lalor (FF)	Tom Enright (FG)	Oliver J. Flanagan (FG)
22nd	1981	Ger Connolly (FF)	Bernard Cowen (FF)	Liam Hyland (FF)	Tom Enright (FG)	Oliver J. Flanagan (FG)
23rd	1982 (Feb)	Ger Connolly (FF)	Bernard Cowen (FF)	Liam Hyland (FF)	Tom Enright (FG)	Oliver J. Flanagan (FG)
24th	1982 (Nov)	Ger Connolly (FF)	Bernard Cowen (FF)	Liam Hyland (FF)	Tom Enright (FG)	Oliver J. Flanagan (FG)
24th	1984 by-election	Ger Connolly (FF)	Brian Cowen (FF)	Liam Hyland (FF)	Tom Enright (FG)	Oliver J. Flanagan (FG)
25th	1987	Ger Connolly (FF)	Brian Cowen (FF)	Liam Hyland (FF)	Tom Enright (FG)	Charles Flanagan (FG)
26th	1989	Ger Connolly (FF)	Brian Cowen (FF)	Liam Hyland (FF)	Tom Enright (FG)	Charles Flanagan (FG)
27th	1992	Ger Connolly (FF)	Brian Cowen (FF)	Liam Hyland (FF)	Pat Gallagher (Lab)	Charles Flanagan (FG)
28th	1997	John Moloney (FF)	Brian Cowen (FF)	Seán Fleming (FF)	Tom Enright (FG)	Charles Flanagan (FG)
29th	2002	John Moloney (FF)	Brian Cowen (FF)	Seán Fleming (FF)	Olwyn Enright (FG)	Tom Parlon (PDs)
30th	2007	John Moloney (FF)	Brian Cowen (FF)	Seán Fleming (FF)	Olwyn Enright (FG)	Charles Flanagan (FG)
31st	2011	Brian Stanley (SF)	Barry Cowen (FF)	Seán Fleming (FF)	Marcella Corcoran Kennedy (FG)	Charles Flanagan (FG)
32nd	2016	Constituency abolished. See Laois and Offaly.				
33rd	2020	Brian Stanley (SF)	Barry Cowen (FF)	Seán Fleming (FF)	Carol Nolan (Ind.)	Charles Flanagan (FG)
33rd	2024	Brian Stanley (SF)	(Vacant)	Seán Fleming (FF)	Carol Nolan (Ind.)	Charles Flanagan (FG)
34th	2024	Constituency abolished. See Laois and Offaly.				

Dáil	Election	Deputy (Party)	Deputy (Party)	Deputy (Party)
32nd	2016	Brian Stanley (SF)	Seán Fleming (FF)	Charles Flanagan (FG)
33rd	2020	Constituency abolished. See Laois–Offaly.		
34th	2024	Brian Stanley (Ind.)	Seán Fleming (FF)	William Aird (FG)
