= 2014 Laois County Council election =

Part of the 2014 Irish local elections

- 23 May 2014

All 19 seats to Laois County Council
	First party	Second party	Third party
Party	Fianna Fáil	Fine Gael	Sinn Féin
Seats won	7	6	2
Seat change	-1	-6	+1
	Fourth party	Fifth party
Party	Labour	Independent
Seats won	1	3
Seat change	-	-
- Map showing the area of Laois County Council
Council control after election
TBD

An election to all 19 seats on Laois County Council took place on 23 May 2014 as part of the 2014 Irish local elections, a reduction from 21 seats at the 2009 election. County Laois was divided into three local electoral areas to elect councillors for a five-year term of office on the electoral system of proportional representation by means of the single transferable vote (PR-STV). In addition, the town councils of Mountmellick and Portlaoise were both abolished.

Fianna Fáil became the largest party after the elections securing 7 seats. Fine Gael, by contrast, had a very poor set of results and lost half of their seats returning with just 6 seats in all. Sinn Féin doubled their representation to 2 seats and Labour retained a seat on the council in the Portlaoise LEA. Independents made up the remainder of the Council membership.

== Results by party ==
Party	Seats	±	1st pref	FPv%	±%
Fianna Fáil	7	▼1	10,837	32.8	
Fine Gael	6	▼6	9,959	30.2	
Sinn Féin	2	▲1	4,204	12.7	
Labour	1	Steady	1,544	4.7	
Independent	3	Steady	6,208	18.8	
Total	19	▼6	32,752	100.0	

== Results by local electoral area ==
*: Outgoing councillor.

=== Borris-in-Ossory–Mountmellick ===
Bossis-in-Ossory–Mountmellick: 6 seats
Party	Candidate	FPv%	Count									
Party	Candidate	FPv%	1	2	3	4	5	6	7	8	9	10
Fine Gael	John King	9.87	1,189	1,190	1,195	1,199	1,199	1,204	1,414	1,454	1,689	1,694
Independent	James Kelly	9.68	1,166	1,242	1,250	1,396	1,424	1,450	1,511	1,759		
Independent	Brendan Phelan	9.11	1,097	1,129	1,130	1,172	1,198	1,213	1,285	1,432	1,781	
Fianna Fáil	Paddy Bracken	9.11	1,051	1,086	1,203	1,223	1,311	1,542	1,560	1,680	1,807	
Fianna Fáil	Séamus McDonald	7.64	920	935	955	978	1,259	1,368	1,382	1,448	1,531	1,604
Sinn Féin	Rhoda Dooley-Brogan	7.23	871	921	942	962	1,006	1,051	1,071	1,071		
Fine Gael	Michael Lalor	7.17	864	903	911	984	1,002	1,028	1,130	1,186	1,218	1,219
Fianna Fáil	Michael Phelan	7.16	863	866	868	950	965	972	1,078	1,121	1,121	
Fine Gael	David Goodwin	7.03	847	866	968	982	1,068	1,164	1,297	1,331	1,381	1,387
Fine Gael	John Finlay	5.44	656	663	691	738	751	793	793			
Fianna Fáil	Joe Digan	5.41	652	657	660	685	685					
Fianna Fáil	Gerard Phelan	4.42	533	537	537	537						
Labour	Lisa Delaney	4.37	526	559	678	686	709	709				
Fine Gael	Bobby Delaney	3.64	439	459	459							
Independent	Pat Cooper	1.64	197									
Independent	Donal Keenan	1.47	177									
Electorate: 19,840 Valid: 12,048 (60.73%) Spoilt: 125 Quota: 1,722 Turnout: 12,173 (61.36%)

=== Graiguecullen–Portarlington ===
Graiguecullen–Portarlington: 6 seats
Party	Candidate	FPv%	Count							
Party	Candidate	FPv%	1	2	3	4	5	6	7	8
Sinn Féin	Aidan Mullins	14.64	1,547							
Fianna Fáil	Padraig Fleming	11.79	1,246	1,290	1,309	1,369	1,391	1,393	1,522	
Independent	Ben Brennan	10.53	1,112	1,198	1,218	1,303	1,410	1,420	1,493	1,560
Fine Gael	Tom Mulhall	9.79	1,034	1,036	1,073	1,131	1,204	1,208	1,327	1,435
Fine Gael	John Moran	8.58	906	923	942	955	973	974	1,260	1,432
Fianna Fáil	Paschal McEvoy	8.36	883	885	897	924	948	950	994	1,319
Fianna Fáil	Willie Murphy	7.61	804	806	858	897	1,116	1,131	1,137	1,209
Fianna Fáil	Dick Miller	6.87	726	733	742	789	827	828	900	
Fine Gael	James Daly	6.61	698	714	752	791	808	810		
Independent	Ray Cribbin	5.01	529	546	592	672				
Independent	Kevin Scully	4.54	480	505	541					
Labour	Gráinne Corcoran	3.15	333	343						
Independent	Keith Lennon	2.53	267							
Electorate: 19,295 Valid: 10,565 (54.76%) Spoilt: 100 Quota: 1,510 Turnout: 10,665 (55.27%)

=== Portlaoise ===
Portlaoise: 7 seats
Party	Candidate	FPv%	Count											
Party	Candidate	FPv%	1	2	3	4	5	6	7	8	9	10	11	12
Fine Gael	William Aird	13.95	1,450											
Fianna Fáil	John Joe Fennelly	13.22	1,374											
Sinn Féin	Caroline Dwane-Stanley	12.97	1,348											
Fine Gael	Mary Sweeney	9.98	1,037	1,075	1,088	1,094	1,095	1,117	1,131	1,263	1,305			
Fianna Fáil	Catherine Fitzgerald	7.90	821	841	856	856	858	923	932	984	1,012	1,051	1,119	
Fianna Fáil	Jerry Lodge	6.95	722	738	749	754	757	796	812	876	912	949	1,036	
Labour	Noel Tuohy	6.59	685	698	699	707	709	746	770	835	877	1,009	1,146	
Independent	Rotimi Adebari	5.59	581	585	587	637	639	660	690	713	777	818	948	
Fine Gael	Jim Ring	4.59	477	487	508	509	510	513	518	559	597	597		
Independent	Stephen Greene	4.42	459	463	464	487	494	505	570	586	693	708	708	
Sinn Féin	Sharon Bailey	4.22	438	441	445	447	474	485	548	552	552			
Fine Gael	Kathleen O'Brien	3.48	362	398	398	402	404	422	434	434				
Anti-Austerity Alliance	Ray Fitzpatrick	2.43	252	254	256	269	271	281	281					
Fianna Fáil	David Ryan	2.33	242	245	250	255	255	255						
Independent	Osaro Fajimiyo	1.04	108	109	109	109								
Independent	Joseph McCormack	0.34	35	36	36	36								
Electorate: 20,568 Valid: 10,391 Spoilt: 104 Quota: 1,299 Turnout: 10,495 (51%)

== Changes ==
=== Co-options ===
Party	Outgoing	LEA	Reason	Date	Co-optee
Fianna Fáil	Jerry Lodge	Portlaoise	Death.	4 April 2018	Pauline Madigan
