= George Petrie (antiquarian) =

Irish artist, antiquarian and archaeologist (1790–1866)

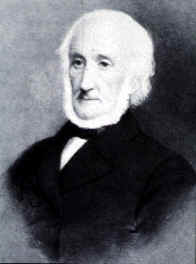
- Portrait of Petrie, by Bernard Mulrenin
- Born: 1 January 1790; Dame Street, Dublin, Ireland
- Died: 17 January 1866 (aged 76)
- Occupations: Painter, Antiquarian

George Petrie (1 January 1790 – 17 January 1866) was an Irish artist, antiquarian, archaeologist and collector of Irish traditional music. Petrie played a role in building the collections of the Royal Irish Academy and National Museum of Ireland.

== Early life ==
Petrie was born on 1 January 1790 (Note: Also cited as 1789.) in Dame Street, Dublin to James Petrie, a portrait painter and Elizabeth Petrie (née Simpson). An only child, Petrie's father was born in Dublin to Scottish parents whilst his mother was born in Edinburgh.

Enrolling at the English Grammar School in 1799, Petrie later attended the Dublin Society drawing school. Helping his father paint miniatures from childhood, Petrie developed an interest in archaeology as a teenager.

== Career ==
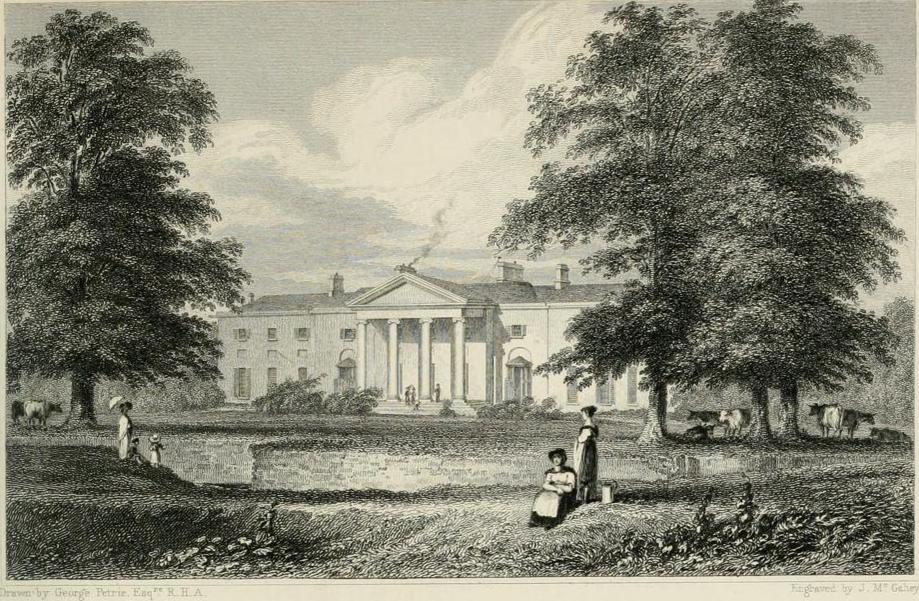
Vice-Regal Lodge, Dublin, c. 1831 – by George Petrie.

After an abortive trip to England in the company of friends Francis Danby and James Arthur O'Connor, he returned to Ireland where he worked mostly producing sketches for engravings for travel books – including among others, George Newenham Wright's guides to Killarney, Wicklow and Dublin, Thomas Cromwell's Excursions through Ireland, and James Norris Brewer's Beauties of Ireland.

In the late 1820s and 1830s, Petrie significantly revitalised the Royal Irish Academy's antiquities committee. He was responsible for their acquisition of many important Irish manuscripts, including an autograph copy of the Annals of the Four Masters, as well as examples of insular metalwork, including the Cross of Cong and Roscrea Brooch.

His writings on early Irish archaeology and architecture were of great significance, especially his essay on the Round Towers of Ireland, which appeared in his 1845 book titled The Ecclesiastical Architecture of Ireland. He is often called "the father of Irish archaeology". His survey of the tombs at Carrowmore still informs study of the site today.

From 1833 to 1843, he was employed by Thomas Colby and Thomas Larcom as head of the Topographical Department (the antiquities division) of the Irish Ordnance Survey. Amongst his staff were John O'Donovan and Eugene O'Curry.

A prizewinning essay submitted to the Royal Irish Academy in 1834 on Irish military architecture was never published, but his seminal essay On the History and Antiquities of Tara Hill was published by the Academy in 1839. During this period Petrie was himself the editor of two popular antiquarian magazines, the Dublin Penny Journal and, later, the Irish Penny Journal.

Another major contribution of Petrie's to Irish culture was the collection of Irish traditional airs and melodies which he published in 1855 as The Petrie Collection of the Ancient Music of Ireland. The first commercial recording of Petrie's collection was The Petrie Collection of the Ancient Music of Ireland (the 1855 Edition of 147 Airs & the 1882 Edition of 40 Airs) [2007, 8-cd set, Trigon TRD 1526, 187 tracks] arranged and performed by Irish pianist J.J. Sheridan. William Stokes's contemporary biography includes detailed accounts of Petrie's working methods in his collecting of traditional music: "The song having been given, O'Curry wrote the Irish words, when Petrie's work began. The singer recommenced, stopping at a signal from him at every two or three bars of the melody to permit the writing of the notes, and often repeating the passage until it was correctly taken down..."

As an artist, his favourite medium was watercolour which, due to the prejudices of the age, was considered inferior to oil painting. Nonetheless, he can be considered one of the finest Irish Romantic painters of his era. Some of his best work is in the collections of the National Gallery of Ireland, such as his watercolour painting Gougane Barra Lake with the Hermitage of St Finbarr, Co. Cork (1831).

He was awarded the Royal Irish Academy's prestigious Cunningham Medal three times: firstly in 1831 for his essay on the round towers, secondly in 1834 for the essay (now lost) on Irish military architecture, and thirdly in 1839 for his essay on the antiquities of Tara Hill.

== Works ==
incomplete, only larger works listed

Music

- Petrie, George (ed.), The Petrie Collection of the Ancient Music of Ireland, M. H. Gill, Dublin
  - Volume 1, 1855
  - Volume 2, 1882, uncompleted fragment published posthumously

Illustrations

- Wright, G.M., ed. (1832), Ireland Illustrated from Original Drawings by G. Petrie, W.H. Bartlett, & T.M. Baynes with descriptions by G.N. Wright, H. Fisher, Son, and Jackson
- Wright, G.M., ed. (1821), An Historical Guide to Ancient and Modern Dublin. Illustrated with engravings after drawings by George Petrie, Esq., Baldwin, Cradock, and Joy : London
- Wright, G.M., ed. (1834), A Guide to the Giant's Causeway, and the North East Coast of the County of Antrim. Illustrated by Engravings, after designs of George Petrie, Esq., William Curry, Jun. and Company : Dublin; Simpkin and Marshall : London

Antiquarian works

- The Ecclesiastical Architecture of Ireland, anterior to the Anglo-Norman invasion; comprising an essay on the origin and uses of the Round Towers of Ireland (2nd ed.), Hodges and Smith : Dublin, 1845 [1833]
  - Also as Petrie, George (1845), "An Inquiry into the Origin and Uses of the Round Towers of Ireland; Comprising Remarks on the Ecclesiastical Architecture of Ireland Anterior to the Anglo-Norman Invasion", The Transactions of the Royal Irish Academy, 20, Royal Irish Academy: iii–521, JSTOR 30078994
- An Essay on Military Architecture in Ireland Previous to the English Invasion, 1834, unpublished, won a gold medal from the Royal Irish Academy, see (Petrie & O'Malley 1972)
- Petrie, George (1839), "On the History and Antiquities of Tara Hill", The Transactions of the Royal Irish Academy, 18, Royal Irish Academy: 25–232, JSTOR 30078991
- Petrie, George (1850), "On the Cross of Cong", Proceedings of the Royal Irish Academy, 4, Royal Irish Academy: 572–585, JSTOR 20520370

== Sources ==
- Cooper, David. The Petrie Collection of the Ancient Music of Ireland. Cork University Press, 2002
- Crooke, Elizabeth. Politics, Archaeology and the Creation of a National Museum of Ireland: An Expression of National Life. Dublin: Irish Academic Press, 2001. ISBN 978-0-7165-2729-9
- Stanford, Charles Villiers, ed. (1902–1905), The Complete Collection of Irish Music as Noted by George Petrie, vol. 3 vols., Boosey & Co., London
- Petrie, George; O'Malley, D. J. S. (1972), "Aspects of George Petrie. V. An Essay on Military Architecture in Ireland Previous to the English Invasion", Proceedings of the Royal Irish Academy: Archaeology, Culture, History, Literature, 72, Royal Irish Academy: 219–269, JSTOR 25506268
- Cox, Michael F. (May 1913), "George Petrie", The Irish Monthly, 41 (479), Irish Jesuit Province: 233–248, JSTOR 20503385
- Dillon, Myles (Autumn 1967), "George Petrie (1789-1866)", Studies: An Irish Quarterly Review, 56 (223), Irish Province of the Society of Jesus: 266–276, JSTOR 30087830
- Stokes, William (1868), The Life and Labours in Art and Archaeology, of George Petrie, Longmans, Green, & Co.
