= Kieran Phelan =

Irish politician (1949–2010)

Senator
- In office 12 September 2002 – 26 May 2010
- Constituency: Industrial and Commercial Panel

Personal details
- Born: 19 November 1949 County Laois, Ireland
- Died: 26 May 2010 (aged 60) Dublin, Ireland
- Party: Fianna Fáil
- Spouse: Mary Phelan
- Children: 5

Kieran Phelan (19 November 1949 – 26 May 2010) was an Irish Fianna Fáil politician and member of Seanad Éireann on the Industrial and Commercial Panel.

Phelan was a farmer and auctioneer. He was elected to Laois County Council in 1991 as a councillor for Borris-in-Ossory, where he topped the poll in 1999. He first stood for the Seanad in 1997, where he was an unsuccessful candidate on the Agricultural Panel, and in 2002 he was elected to the 22nd Seanad on the Industrial and Commercial Panel, which re-elected him in 2007.

Phelan died suddenly in Dublin on 26 May 2010. The death occurred at a Dublin hotel he was sharing with James McDaid, TD and medical practitioner, who later told of his frantic bid to revive Phelan. McDaid had been upstairs listening to the radio when he was alerted by their colleague Dara Calleary.
