= George Newenham Wright =

Irish writer and Anglican clergyman

Personal details
- Born: 1790s
- Died: 1877
- Denomination: Anglican

George Newenham Wright (c. 1794–1877) was an Irish writer and Anglican clergyman. He was born in Dublin; his father, John Thomas Wright was a doctor. He graduated B.A. from Trinity College Dublin in 1814 and M.A. in 1817, having been elected a Scholar of the College in 1812. He married Charlotte Mulock in 1819.

He held several curacies in Ireland before moving to St Mary Woolnoth, London.

By 1851, he was a teacher of classics, resident in Windsor with his wife. In 1861 he noted having a number of pupils boarding with him at Frome. By 1863 he was master of Tewkesbury Grammar School.

He died on 24 March 1877 at Pierrepont Street, Bath.

From the 1820s to the 1840s some minor topographical works and schoolbooks on subjects ranging from the Greek language to biography and philosophy by Wright were published. There were several on Ireland, two of which have illustrations by George Petrie.

== Works ==
- 1821: An Historical Guide to Ancient and Modern Dublin (Petrie, George, illustrator). London: Baldwin, Cradock, and Joy (2nd ed 1825)
- --do.-- An Historical Guide to the City of Dublin. Dublin: Four Courts Press, 1980 (Facsim of: 2nd edition published London: Baldwin, Cradock and Joy, 1825)
- 1822: A Guide to the Lakes of Killarney
- 1827: A Guide to the County of Wicklow
- 1831: Ireland Illustrated
- 1833: Scenes in North Wales. London: T. T. & J. Tegg; reissued: ISBN 978-0-217-54512-9
- 1834: Scenes in Ireland. London: Thomas Tegg and Son; Glasgow: R. Griffin and Co.; Dublin: W.F. Wakeman
- 1843: China (Allom, Thomas, illustrator) London: Fisher, Son & Co.
- --do.-- The Chinese Empire illustrated. London : London Printing & Publishing Co., [1858, 59.].
- --do.-- --do.-- (reissued) Hong Kong: John Nicholson, 1988.
- 1851: Belgium, the Rhine, Italy, Greece, and the shores and islands of the Mediterranean: illustrated in a series of ... engravings ... (text by) G. N. Wright & L. F. A. Buckingham. 2 vols. London: Peter Jackson

The Historic Guide to Bath published in 1864 by R E Peach of 8 Bridge Street, Bath
