= Mairéad Farrell (politician) =

Irish politician (born 1990)

Mairéad Farrell TD
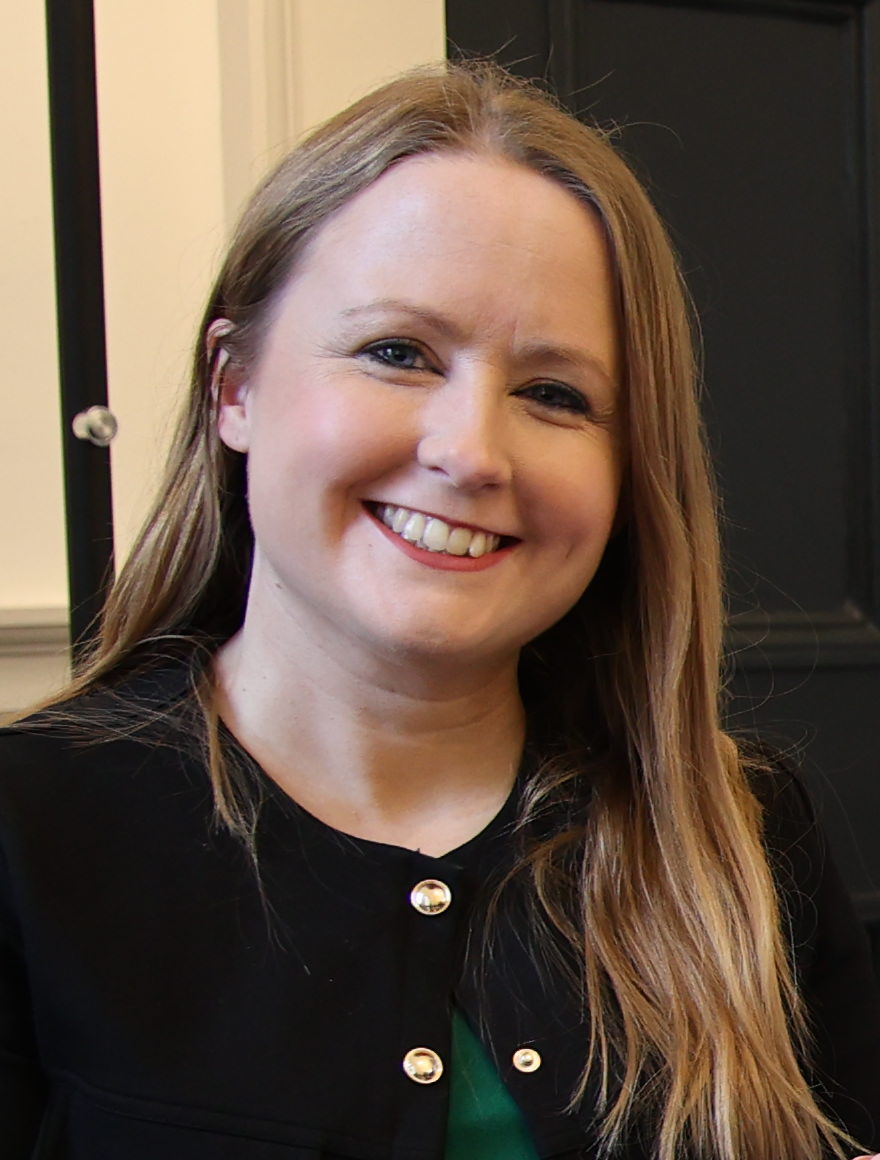
- Farrell in 2024

Teachta Dála
- Incumbent
- Assumed office February 2020
- Constituency: Galway West

Chair of the Public Accounts Committee
- In office 22 October 2024 – 8 November 2024
- Preceded by: Brian Stanley
- Succeeded by: John Brady

Personal details
- Born: 5 January 1990 (age 36) Galway, Ireland
- Party: Sinn Féin
- Relatives: Mairéad Farrell (aunt)
- Education: NUI Galway; Queen's University Belfast

Mairéad Farrell (born 5 January 1990) is an Irish Sinn Féin politician who has been a Teachta Dála (TD) for the Galway West constituency since the 2020 general election.

== Early life and education ==
Mairéad Farrell is from the Mervue area in Galway City. Her father, Niall, is an anti-war activist and her aunt, also called Mairéad Farrell, was a member of the Provisional Irish Republican Army who became one of the Gibraltar Three (three PIRA members killed by the British SAS in Gibraltar).

Farrell holds a Bachelor of Arts in Economics and History from NUI Galway and a Master of Science in Finance from Queen's University Belfast.

== Political career ==
In her youth, Farrell and her family canvassed for Catherine Connolly and her sister Colette during their election campaigns. Farrell joined Ógra Shinn Féin in college, describing it as a formative experience that offered both political training and social engagement, and she credited it with giving young members valuable opportunities to develop skills such as organising and public speaking. While her family background influenced her politicisation, she said she did not feel burdened by the republican legacy of her late aunt and namesake. Farrell explained that she had long aspired to join Sinn Féin, but followed her mother’s advice to wait until after school, formally becoming a member before college. She has cited the 2008 financial crash as a decisive factor, saying Sinn Féin’s economic positions and her own commitment to Irish unity aligned with the party’s left-republican outlook.

Farrell sat on Sinn Féin's National Youth Committee for five years. She represented the Galway City East local electoral area on Galway City Council from 2014 to 2019. She became a TD for Galway West in February 2020 at that year's general election.

She is Sinn Féin's Spokesperson on Public Expenditure and Reform. She appeared on the Irish Times list of top 50 young people to watch in 2021 as well as one of 10 TDs making a name for themselves since the 2020 election in the Irish Examiner.

Farrell is a regular contributor to Irish and international media and has written for the Irish Times, the Irish Examiner and international publications such as CounterPunch.

In June 2023 Farrell was scheduled to appear alongside Clare Daly, Mick Wallace, Catherine Connolly, George Galloway and academic Karen Devine in a neutrality forum hosted by the organisation Galway Alliance Against War, which describes itself as a group in Galway for those who are "opposed to war and military imperialism", prior to the event's cancellation. Farrell said she would be discussing her party's position at the event.

Farrell served as Cathaoirleach of the Dáil's influential Public Accounts Committee, after Brian Stanley's resignation from Sinn Féin from 22 October 2024 until the 2024 general election.

Farrell was re-elected in 2024. She was subsequently appointed Cathaoirleach of the Committee on Finance, Public Expenditure, Public Service Reform and Digitalisation, and Taoiseach. She currently serves on Sinn Féin's Front Bench, as spokesperson on Public Expenditure, Infrastructure, Public Service Reform and Digitalisation.

Dáil	Election	Deputy (Party)	Deputy (Party)	Deputy (Party)	Deputy (Party)	Deputy (Party)
9th	1937	Gerald Bartley (FF)	Joseph Mongan (FG)	Seán Tubridy (FF)	3 seats 1937–1977	
10th	1938	Gerald Bartley (FF)	Joseph Mongan (FG)	Seán Tubridy (FF)	3 seats 1937–1977	
10th	1940 by-election	Gerald Bartley (FF)	Joseph Mongan (FG)	John J. Keane (FF)	3 seats 1937–1977	
11th	1943	Gerald Bartley (FF)	Joseph Mongan (FG)	Eamon Corbett (FF)	3 seats 1937–1977	
12th	1944	Gerald Bartley (FF)	Joseph Mongan (FG)	Michael Lydon (FF)	3 seats 1937–1977	
13th	1948	Gerald Bartley (FF)	Joseph Mongan (FG)	Michael Lydon (FF)	3 seats 1937–1977	
14th	1951	Gerald Bartley (FF)	John Mannion Snr (FG)	Peadar Duignan (FF)	3 seats 1937–1977	
15th	1954	Gerald Bartley (FF)	Fintan Coogan Snr (FG)	Johnny Geoghegan (FF)	3 seats 1937–1977	
16th	1957	Gerald Bartley (FF)	Fintan Coogan Snr (FG)	Johnny Geoghegan (FF)	3 seats 1937–1977	
17th	1961	Gerald Bartley (FF)	Fintan Coogan Snr (FG)	Johnny Geoghegan (FF)	3 seats 1937–1977	
18th	1965	Bobby Molloy (FF)	Fintan Coogan Snr (FG)	Johnny Geoghegan (FF)	3 seats 1937–1977	
19th	1969	Bobby Molloy (FF)	Fintan Coogan Snr (FG)	Johnny Geoghegan (FF)	3 seats 1937–1977	
20th	1973	Bobby Molloy (FF)	Fintan Coogan Snr (FG)	Johnny Geoghegan (FF)	3 seats 1937–1977	
20th	1975 by-election	Bobby Molloy (FF)	Fintan Coogan Snr (FG)	Máire Geoghegan-Quinn (FF)	3 seats 1937–1977	
21st	1977	Bobby Molloy (FF)	John Mannion Jnr (FG)	Máire Geoghegan-Quinn (FF)	Bill Loughnane (FF)	4 seats 1977–1981
22nd	1981	Bobby Molloy (FF)	John Donnellan (FG)	Máire Geoghegan-Quinn (FF)	Mark Killilea Jnr (FF)	Michael D. Higgins (Lab)
23rd	1982 (Feb)	Bobby Molloy (FF)	John Donnellan (FG)	Máire Geoghegan-Quinn (FF)	Frank Fahey (FF)	Michael D. Higgins (Lab)
24th	1982 (Nov)	Bobby Molloy (FF)	John Donnellan (FG)	Máire Geoghegan-Quinn (FF)	Frank Fahey (FF)	Fintan Coogan Jnr (FG)
25th	1987	Bobby Molloy (PDs)	John Donnellan (FG)	Máire Geoghegan-Quinn (FF)	Frank Fahey (FF)	Michael D. Higgins (Lab)
26th	1989	Bobby Molloy (PDs)	Pádraic McCormack (FG)	Máire Geoghegan-Quinn (FF)	Frank Fahey (FF)	Michael D. Higgins (Lab)
27th	1992	Bobby Molloy (PDs)	Pádraic McCormack (FG)	Máire Geoghegan-Quinn (FF)	Éamon Ó Cuív (FF)	Michael D. Higgins (Lab)
28th	1997	Bobby Molloy (PDs)	Pádraic McCormack (FG)	Frank Fahey (FF)	Éamon Ó Cuív (FF)	Michael D. Higgins (Lab)
29th	2002	Noel Grealish (PDs)	Pádraic McCormack (FG)	Frank Fahey (FF)	Éamon Ó Cuív (FF)	Michael D. Higgins (Lab)
30th	2007	Noel Grealish (PDs)	Pádraic McCormack (FG)	Frank Fahey (FF)	Éamon Ó Cuív (FF)	Michael D. Higgins (Lab)
31st	2011	Noel Grealish (Ind.)	Brian Walsh (FG)	Seán Kyne (FG)	Éamon Ó Cuív (FF)	Derek Nolan (Lab)
32nd	2016	Noel Grealish (Ind.)	Hildegarde Naughton (FG)	Seán Kyne (FG)	Éamon Ó Cuív (FF)	Catherine Connolly (Ind.)
33rd	2020	Noel Grealish (Ind.)	Hildegarde Naughton (FG)	Mairéad Farrell (SF)	Éamon Ó Cuív (FF)	Catherine Connolly (Ind.)
34th	2024	Noel Grealish (Ind.)	Hildegarde Naughton (FG)	Mairéad Farrell (SF)	John Connolly (FF)	Catherine Connolly (Ind.)
34th	2026 by-election	Noel Grealish (Ind.)	Hildegarde Naughton (FG)	Mairéad Farrell (SF)	John Connolly (FF)	Seán Kyne (FG)
