= James Joseph Sheridan =

Irish musician, composer and music historian

James Joseph (J.J.) Sheridan (26 September 1951 in Borris-in-Ossory, County Laois – 31 December 2014 in New York City) was an Irish pianist, composer, arranger and music historian who specialized in preserving and recording Irish music.

== Education and career ==
Sheridan attended the Royal Irish Academy of Music where he studied piano with John O’Sullivan and Valerie Walker, as well as composition with A.J. Potter. He also attended the London College of Music.

His compositions include "Saint Canice's Mass" (1969, published when he was only 18) and other choral works, and a huge output of piano arrangements and transcriptions of "ancient" Irish music.

He emigrated to the United States in 1980 and lived for many years in Atlanta.

It was Sheridan's ambition to honor and preserve Irish music through his concert appearances and recordings. In 1988 he founded Trigon Recordings as a vehicle for preserving Irish music, especially the works of Turlough O'Carolan, Edward Bunting, Patrick Weston Joyce and George Petrie. In 2006 Sheridan released a highly praised collection of Ireland's greatest slow airs titled Soul of the Irish Piano. An eight-disc set, The Complete Works Of Turlough O’Carolan, was released in 2007. This was the first and still the only complete edition of all 214 pieces by the great eighteenth-century Irish harper known as "the last of the bards."

In 2011 Sheridan received Irish America’s Stars of the South award which honors notable Irish people in the southern United States. He died in New York City on 31 December. 2014.
