= Public Accounts Committee (Ireland) =

Committee of Dáil Éireann

The Public Accounts Committee (PAC) (formally the Committee of Public Accounts) (Irish: An Coiste um Chuntais Phoiblí) is a standing committee of Dáil Éireann, the lower house of the Irish Parliament. It oversees government expenditures to ensure they are effective and honest. It is responsible for examining reports of the Comptroller and Auditor General on departmental expenditure and certain other accounts. It also considers the Comptroller and Auditor General's reports of economy, efficiency, effectiveness evaluation systems, procedures and practices. The PAC has a key role to play in ensuring accountability and transparency in the way Government agencies allocate, spend and manage their finances and in guaranteeing that the taxpayer receives value for every euro spent. By the nature of its role as the public spending watchdog, the Committee of Public Accounts is one of the most powerful Oireachtas Committees.

== Overview ==
PAC was established under Standing Order 163 of Dáil Éireann, which requires it to be set up as a standing committee after each general election. The committee is constituted to be impartially representative of the Dáil and consists of thirteen members. A member of the Government or a Minister of State can not be a member of the PAC. It is normally chaired by a member of the opposition.

== Membership ==
Membership of the committee for the 34th Dáil is as follows:

Member	Party	Constituency
John Brady (Cathaoirleach)	Sinn Féin	Wicklow
Paul McAuliffe (Leas-Cathaoirleach)	Fianna Fáil	Dublin North-West
Catherine Ardagh	Fianna Fáil	Dublin South-Central
Cathy Bennett	Sinn Féin	Cavan–Monaghan
Grace Boland	Fine Gael	Dublin Fingal West
Joanna Byrne	Sinn Féin	Louth
Albert Dolan	Fianna Fáil	Galway East
Aidan Farrelly	Social Democrats	Kildare North
James Geoghegan	Fine Gael	Dublin Bay South
Eoghan Kenny	Labour	Cork North-Central
Séamus McGrath	Fianna Fáil	Cork South-Central
Paul Murphy	PBP–Solidarity	Dublin South-West
Joe Neville	Fine Gael	Kildare North

== Cathaoirligh of the Public Accounts Committee ==
It is customary for a member of the largest opposition party to chair the committee.

Year	Chairperson	Party
1987–1993	Gay Mitchell	Fine Gael
1993–1995	Jim Mitchell	Fine Gael
1995–1997	Denis Foley	Fianna Fáil
1997–2001	Jim Mitchell	Fine Gael
2001–2002	Michael Finucane	Fine Gael
2002–2004	John Perry	Fine Gael
2004–2007	Michael Noonan	Fine Gael
2007–2011	Bernard Allen	Fine Gael
2011–2016	John McGuinness	Fianna Fáil
2016–2020	Seán Fleming	Fianna Fáil
2020–2024	Brian Stanley	Sinn Féin
2024–2025	Mairéad Farrell	Sinn Féin
2025–present	John Brady	Sinn Féin

== See also ==
- Public accounts committee
