= Brian Stanley (politician) =

Irish politician (born 1958)

Brian Stanley TD
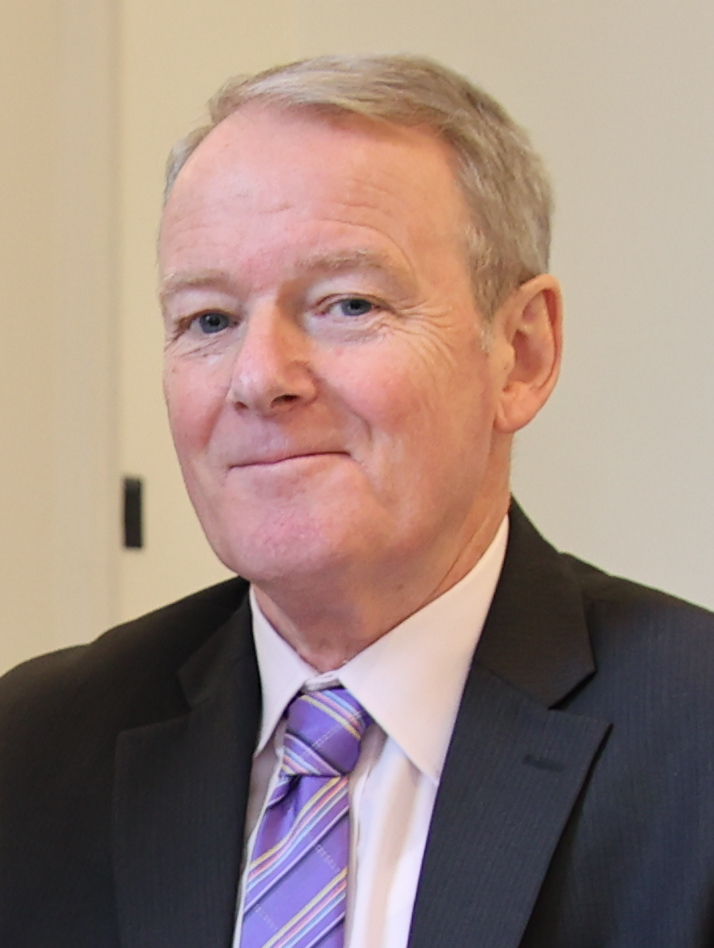
- Stanley in 2024

Teachta Dála
- Incumbent
- Assumed office November 2024
- In office February 2016 – February 2020
- Constituency: Laois
- In office February 2020 – November 2024
- In office February 2011 – February 2016
- Constituency: Laois–Offaly

Chair of the Public Accounts Committee
- In office 15 July 2020 – 22 October 2024
- Preceded by: Seán Fleming
- Succeeded by: Mairéad Farrell

Personal details
- Born: January 1958 (age 68) Portlaoise, County Laois, Ireland
- Party: Independent
- Other political affiliations: Sinn Féin (until 2024)
- Spouse: Caroline Dwane-Stanley
- Children: 2
- Education: Dublin Institute of Technology

Brian Stanley (born January 1958) is an Irish independent politician who has been a Teachta Dála (TD) for the Laois constituency since the 2024 general election, and previously from 2016 to 2020. He was a TD for the Laois–Offaly constituency from 2020 to 2024, and previously from 2011 to 2016. He served as Chair of the Public Accounts Committee from July 2020 to October 2024.

== Political career ==
Stanley unsuccessfully contested the 2002 and 2007 general elections in Laois-Offaly.

Stanley was elected at the 1999 local elections as a member of Portlaoise Town Council, and was re-elected in 2004, and in 2009. He was elected as a member of Laois County Council for the Portlaoise local electoral area at the 2004 local elections, and was re-elected in 2009. His wife, Caroline Dwane-Stanley, is a member of Laois County Council.

In July 2020, Stanley was appointed as the chair of the Public Accounts Committee (PAC), being the first Sinn Féin TD to hold the office. Following his resignation from Sinn Féin in October 2024, he was replaced by Mairéad Farrell as chair of the PAC.

In December 2020, Stanley became embroiled in controversies over a number of tweets, originating with a tweet that referenced the Narrow Water Ambush by the IRA in 1979. In response, Stanley offered apologies before deleting his Twitter account and asked for speaking time in Dáil Eireann to address the situation. Another tweet made by Stanley about Leo Varadkar was criticised by Micheál Martin, saying the tweet had an "inference [sic] of homophobia."

On 12 October 2024, Stanley announced his resignation from Sinn Féin, saying he had been subject to an internal "kangaroo court" following a complaint within the party. Sinn Féin later announced that they had referred the complaint to the Gardaí.

He was re-elected as an independent TD for the Laois constituency at the 2024 general election.

== Election results ==
Elections to Laois County Council
Party	Election		FPv	FPv%	Result
Sinn Féin	Portlaoise LEA	1999	416	7.5	Eliminated on count 9/10
Sinn Féin	Portlaoise LEA	2004	1,020	14.4	Elected on count 1/9
Sinn Féin	Portlaoise LEA	2009	1,456	17.5	Elected on count 1/11

Elections to the Dáil
Party	Election		FPv	FPv%	Result
Sinn Féin	Laoighis–Offaly	2002	2,600	4.1	Eliminated on count 4/6
Sinn Féin	Laois–Offaly	2007	3,656	5.1	Eliminated on count 7/11
Sinn Féin	Laois–Offaly	2011	8,032	10.8	Elected on count 13/13
Sinn Féin	Laois	2016	8,242	21.2	Elected on count 3/3
Sinn Féin	Laois–Offaly	2020	16,654	24.0	Elected on count 1/11
Independent	Laois	2024	6,782	17.7	Elected on count 8/8

Dáil	Election	Deputy (Party)	Deputy (Party)	Deputy (Party)
32nd	2016	Brian Stanley (SF)	Seán Fleming (FF)	Charles Flanagan (FG)
33rd	2020	Constituency abolished. See Laois–Offaly.		
34th	2024	Brian Stanley (Ind.)	Seán Fleming (FF)	William Aird (FG)

Dáil	Election	Deputy (Party)	Deputy (Party)	Deputy (Party)	Deputy (Party)	Deputy (Party)
2nd	1921	Joseph Lynch (SF)	Patrick McCartan (SF)	Francis Bulfin (SF)	Kevin O'Higgins (SF)	4 seats 1921–1923
3rd	1922	William Davin (Lab)	Patrick McCartan (PT-SF)	Francis Bulfin (PT-SF)	Kevin O'Higgins (PT-SF)	4 seats 1921–1923
4th	1923	William Davin (Lab)	Laurence Brady (Rep)	Francis Bulfin (CnaG)	Patrick Egan (CnaG)	Seán McGuinness (Rep)
4th	1926 by-election	William Davin (Lab)	Laurence Brady (Rep)	Francis Bulfin (CnaG)	Patrick Egan (CnaG)	James Dwyer (CnaG)
5th	1927 (Jun)	William Davin (Lab)	Patrick Boland (FF)	Thomas Tynan (FF)	John Gill (Lab)	James Dwyer (CnaG)
6th	1927 (Sep)	William Davin (Lab)	Patrick Boland (FF)	Patrick Gorry (FF)	William Aird (CnaG)	James Dwyer (CnaG)
7th	1932	William Davin (Lab)	Patrick Boland (FF)	Patrick Gorry (FF)	Thomas F. O'Higgins (CnaG)	Eugene O'Brien (CnaG)
8th	1933	William Davin (Lab)	Patrick Boland (FF)	Eamon Donnelly (FF)	Thomas F. O'Higgins (CnaG)	Jack Finlay (NCP)
9th	1937	William Davin (Lab)	Patrick Boland (FF)	Patrick Gorry (FF)	Thomas F. O'Higgins (FG)	Jack Finlay (FG)
10th	1938	William Davin (Lab)	Patrick Boland (FF)	Patrick Gorry (FF)	Thomas F. O'Higgins (FG)	Daniel Hogan (FF)
11th	1943	William Davin (Lab)	Patrick Boland (FF)	Patrick Gorry (FF)	Thomas F. O'Higgins (FG)	Oliver J. Flanagan (IMR)
12th	1944	William Davin (Lab)	Patrick Boland (FF)	Patrick Gorry (FF)	Thomas F. O'Higgins (FG)	Oliver J. Flanagan (IMR)
13th	1948	William Davin (Lab)	Patrick Boland (FF)	Patrick Gorry (FF)	Tom O'Higgins, Jnr (FG)	Oliver J. Flanagan (Ind.)
14th	1951	William Davin (Lab)	Patrick Boland (FF)	Peadar Maher (FF)	Tom O'Higgins, Jnr (FG)	Oliver J. Flanagan (Ind.)
15th	1954	William Davin (Lab)	Nicholas Egan (FF)	Peadar Maher (FF)	Tom O'Higgins, Jnr (FG)	Oliver J. Flanagan (FG)
15th	1956 by-election	Kieran Egan (FF)	Nicholas Egan (FF)	Peadar Maher (FF)	Tom O'Higgins, Jnr (FG)	Oliver J. Flanagan (FG)
16th	1957	Kieran Egan (FF)	Nicholas Egan (FF)	Peadar Maher (FF)	Tom O'Higgins, Jnr (FG)	Oliver J. Flanagan (FG)
17th	1961	Kieran Egan (FF)	Nicholas Egan (FF)	Patrick Lalor (FF)	Tom O'Higgins, Jnr (FG)	Oliver J. Flanagan (FG)
18th	1965	Henry Byrne (Lab)	Nicholas Egan (FF)	Patrick Lalor (FF)	Tom O'Higgins, Jnr (FG)	Oliver J. Flanagan (FG)
19th	1969	Ger Connolly (FF)	Bernard Cowen (FF)	Patrick Lalor (FF)	Tom Enright (FG)	Oliver J. Flanagan (FG)
20th	1973	Ger Connolly (FF)	Charles McDonald (FG)	Patrick Lalor (FF)	Tom Enright (FG)	Oliver J. Flanagan (FG)
21st	1977	Ger Connolly (FF)	Bernard Cowen (FF)	Patrick Lalor (FF)	Tom Enright (FG)	Oliver J. Flanagan (FG)
22nd	1981	Ger Connolly (FF)	Bernard Cowen (FF)	Liam Hyland (FF)	Tom Enright (FG)	Oliver J. Flanagan (FG)
23rd	1982 (Feb)	Ger Connolly (FF)	Bernard Cowen (FF)	Liam Hyland (FF)	Tom Enright (FG)	Oliver J. Flanagan (FG)
24th	1982 (Nov)	Ger Connolly (FF)	Bernard Cowen (FF)	Liam Hyland (FF)	Tom Enright (FG)	Oliver J. Flanagan (FG)
24th	1984 by-election	Ger Connolly (FF)	Brian Cowen (FF)	Liam Hyland (FF)	Tom Enright (FG)	Oliver J. Flanagan (FG)
25th	1987	Ger Connolly (FF)	Brian Cowen (FF)	Liam Hyland (FF)	Tom Enright (FG)	Charles Flanagan (FG)
26th	1989	Ger Connolly (FF)	Brian Cowen (FF)	Liam Hyland (FF)	Tom Enright (FG)	Charles Flanagan (FG)
27th	1992	Ger Connolly (FF)	Brian Cowen (FF)	Liam Hyland (FF)	Pat Gallagher (Lab)	Charles Flanagan (FG)
28th	1997	John Moloney (FF)	Brian Cowen (FF)	Seán Fleming (FF)	Tom Enright (FG)	Charles Flanagan (FG)
29th	2002	John Moloney (FF)	Brian Cowen (FF)	Seán Fleming (FF)	Olwyn Enright (FG)	Tom Parlon (PDs)
30th	2007	John Moloney (FF)	Brian Cowen (FF)	Seán Fleming (FF)	Olwyn Enright (FG)	Charles Flanagan (FG)
31st	2011	Brian Stanley (SF)	Barry Cowen (FF)	Seán Fleming (FF)	Marcella Corcoran Kennedy (FG)	Charles Flanagan (FG)
32nd	2016	Constituency abolished. See Laois and Offaly.				
33rd	2020	Brian Stanley (SF)	Barry Cowen (FF)	Seán Fleming (FF)	Carol Nolan (Ind.)	Charles Flanagan (FG)
33rd	2024	Brian Stanley (SF)	(Vacant)	Seán Fleming (FF)	Carol Nolan (Ind.)	Charles Flanagan (FG)
34th	2024	Constituency abolished. See Laois and Offaly.				
