= 1985 Laois County Council election =

Part of the 1985 Irish local elections

- 20 June 1985

All 25 seats on Laois County Council
	First party	Second party	Third party
Party	Fianna Fáil	Fine Gael	Labour
Seats won	14	9	1
Seat change	+3	-3	-1
	Fourth party
Party	Independent
Seats won	1
Seat change	+1
- Map showing the area of Laois County Council
Council control before election
Fianna Fáil
Council control after election
Fianna Fáil

An election to Laois County Council took place on 20 June 1985 as part of the 1985 Irish local election. 25 councillors were elected from five local electoral areas (LEAs) for a five-year term of office on the electoral system of proportional representation by means of the single transferable vote (PR-STV). This term was extended for a further year, to 1991.

== Results by party ==
Party	Seats	±	First Pref. votes	FPv%	±%
Fianna Fáil	14	+3	11,989	50.33	
Fine Gael	9	-3	8,513	35.74	
Labour	1	-1	1,446	6.07	
Independent	1	+1	1,873	7.86	
Totals	25	-	23,219	100.00	—

== Results by local electoral area ==
=== Borris-in-Ossory ===
Borris-in-Ossory: 7 seats
Party	Candidate	FPv%	Count									
Party	Candidate	FPv%	1	2	3	4	5	6	7	8	9	10
Fianna Fáil	Liam Hyland TD*		1,479									
Independent	Jimmy Kelly*		837	873								
Fine Gael	William Mansfield*		712	744	745	800	845	850	854			
Fine Gael	Sean Jacob*		589	654	655	657	749	751	835	914		
Fine Gael	Jim Phelan*		508	528	529	530	571	572	582	664	785	829
Fianna Fáil	Fintan Phelan		390	460	466	493	536	537	569	641	735	737
Labour	Larry Kavanagh		377	395	402	405	500	501	511			
Fianna Fáil	Paddy Phelan*		369	446	447	527	528	531	651	665	723	725
Fianna Fáil	Thomas Fennelly		356	421	423	441	446	447	533	552		
Fine Gael	Brendan Dunne		349	362	368	373						
Fianna Fáil	Eddie Kirwan		326	386	387	435	465	470	530	649	821	824
Fianna Fáil	Eamon Rafter*		313	411	412	428	433	433				
Fianna Fáil	Martin Keane		193	260	262							
Independent	Brendan Clear		31	35								
Electorate: 9,808 Valid: 6,829 (70.01%) Spoilt: 38 Quota: 854 Turnout: 6,867

=== Emo ===
Emo: 4 seats
Party	Candidate	FPv%	Count				
Party	Candidate	FPv%	1	2	3	4	5
Fianna Fáil	Ray Cribbin		691	700	729	903	
Fianna Fáil	Michael Nerney*		684	716	741	852	
Fine Gael	Jim Buggie*		553	624	711	718	725
Labour	Ned Kelly*		456	593	626	698	747
Fianna Fáil	Don Cunningham		377	383	394		
Fine Gael	Mary Lewis		369	387	495	513	521
Fine Gael	John O'Reilly*		296	298			
Labour	Frank Byrne		279				
Electorate: 6,146 Valid: 3,705 (60.93%) Spoilt: 40 Quota: 742 Turnout: 3,745

=== Luggacurren ===
Luggacurren: 4 seats
Party	Candidate	FPv%	Count						
Party	Candidate	FPv%	1	2	3	4	5	6	7
Fianna Fáil	Martin Rohan*		668	674	681	681	712	775	785
Fianna Fáil	James Cooney*		649	679	695	708	927		
Fianna Fáil	Mary Wheatley		556	572	593	610	718	760	862
Fianna Fáil	Liam Doran		369	373	386	439			
Independent	William Fleming*		366	408	436	450	455	458	
Independent	John Daly*		363	403	443	458	489	496	683
Fine Gael	Sen. Charles McDonald*		338	357	432	649	674	680	755
Fine Gael	John Gaffney		267	282	347				
Fine Gael	John Moran		240	271					
Labour	Tony O'Brien		211						
Electorate: 5,915 Valid: 4,027 (63.13%) Spoilt: 41 Quota: 806 Turnout: 4,068

=== Portlaoise ===
Portlaoise: 5 seats
Party	Candidate	FPv%	Count					
Party	Candidate	FPv%	1	2	3	4	5	6
Fianna Fáil	Joe Dunne*		907					
Fine Gael	Tom Keenan*		750					
Fianna Fáil	Jerry Lodge*		564	639	669	678	813	
Fine Gael	William Aird		549	563	581	654	690	763
Fianna Fáil	John Hosey*		471	483	490	568	621	674
Fine Gael	Joe Carroll*		395	401	413	439	457	552
Independent	Joe McCormack		256	267	312	329	359	
Fianna Fáil	Tom Jacob		228	269	278	280		
Fine Gael	Michael Dea		196	197	213			
Labour	Tom Phelan		123	125				
Independent	Patrick Larkin		20	21				
Electorate: 7,056 Valid: 4,459 (63.79%) Spoilt: 42 Quota: 744 Turnout: 4,501

=== Tinnahinch ===
Tinnahinch: 5 seats
Party	Candidate	FPv%	Count							
Party	Candidate	FPv%	1	2	3	4	5	6	7	8
Fianna Fáil	John Moloney		1,279							
Fine Gael	Oliver J. Flanagan TD*		728	779	918					
Fine Gael	David Goodwin*		485	508	562	624	645	650	898	
Fine Gael	Michael Lalor*		478	491	506	522	545	555	658	739
Fianna Fáil	Seamus McDonald		473	660	685	698	928			
Fine Gael	Denis Feighery		440	449	488	499	516	522		
Fianna Fáil	Joe Digan		378	425	447	453	510	616	727	743
Fine Gael	Noel Deffew		271	330						
Fianna Fáil	Donal McCormack		269	358	367	372				
Electorate: 6,332 Valid: 4,801 (76.58%) Spoilt: 48 Quota: 801 Turnout: 4,849
