= Laois (Dáil constituency) =

Dáil constituency (2016–2020, 2024–present)

- Dáil constituency
- Location of Laois within Ireland
- Interactive map of constituency boundaries since the 2024 general election
- Major settlements: Abbeyleix; Mountmellick; Portarlington; Portlaoise; Stradbally

Current constituency
- Created: 2024
- Seats: 3
- TDs: William Aird (FG); Seán Fleming (FF); Brian Stanley (Ind)
- Local government area: County Laois
- Created from: Laois–Offaly

Laois
- Former Dáil constituency

Former constituency
- Created: 2016
- Abolished: 2020
- Seats: 3
- Local government area: County Laois; County Kildare
- Created from: Laois–Offaly
- Replaced by: Kildare South; Laois–Offaly

Laois is a parliamentary constituency represented in Dáil Éireann, the lower house of the Irish parliament or Oireachtas. The constituency elects three deputies (Teachtaí Dála, commonly known as TDs) on the system of proportional representation by means of the single transferable vote (PR-STV).

== History and boundaries ==
The Constituency Commission proposed in its 2012 report that at the 2016 general election a new constituency called Laois be created. The report proposed changes to the constituencies of Ireland to reduce the total number of TDs from 166 to 158.

It was established by the Electoral (Amendment) (Dáil Constituencies) Act 2013. The constituency incorporated all of County Laois from the previous Laois–Offaly constituency, and six electoral divisions from Kildare South.

In the 2016 election, it was described as the "most boring and predictable constituency in this election" by the TheJournal.ie, due to the low number of candidates running and the strength of the incumbent TDs.

It was abolished at the 2020 general election, along with the Offaly constituency. They were replaced by a re-created Laois–Offaly constituency, with the transfer of four electoral divisions in County Offaly to Kildare South.

In 2023, the Electoral Commission recommended the establishment of a three-seat constituency of Laois comprising the entire county of Laois.

For the 2024 general election, the Electoral (Amendment) Act 2023 defines the constituency as:

"The county of Laois."

== TDs ==
Teachtaí Dála (TDs) for Laois 2016–2020
Key to parties: FF = Fianna Fáil; FG = Fine Gael; Ind = Independent; SF = Sinn Féin
Dáil	Election	Deputy (Party)	Deputy (Party)	Deputy (Party)
32nd	2016	Brian Stanley (SF)	Seán Fleming (FF)	Charles Flanagan (FG)
33rd	2020	Constituency abolished. See Laois–Offaly.		
34th	2024	Brian Stanley (Ind)	Seán Fleming (FF)	William Aird (FG)

Note: The columns in this table are used only for presentational purposes, and no significance should be attached to the order of columns. For details of the order in which seats were won at each election, see the detailed results of that election.

== Elections ==
*: Outgoing TD

=== 2024 general election ===
2024 general election: Laois
Party	Candidate	FPv%	Count							
Party	Candidate	FPv%	1	2	3	4	5	6	7	8
Fine Gael	William Aird	24.2	9,269	9,289	9,376	9,470	9,619			
Fianna Fáil	Seán Fleming	21.2	8,123	8,132	8,405	8,469	8,590	8,872	9,382	10,693
Independent	Brian Stanley	17.7	6,782	6,804	6,858	6,945	7,015	7,344	8,170	9,512
Sinn Féin	Maria McCormack	12.8	4,914	4,925	4,934	4,984	5,040	5,538	5,888	6,565
Independent	Aisling Moran	7.8	2,970	2,996	3,013	3,130	3,274	3,652	4,371	
Independent	Elaine Mullally	6.4	2,438	2,463	2,484	2,561	2,606	2,959		
Aontú	Mary Hand	2.7	1,038	1,042	1,051	1,091	1,108			
Green	Rosie Palmer	2.0	747	752	760	788				
PBP–Solidarity	Ken Mooney (Note: Mooney is a member of People Before Profit.)	2.0	745	757	767	795	954			
Independent	Pauline Flanagan	1.5	578	604	610					
Fianna Fáil	Austin Stack	1.3	502	502						
Independent	Jason Lynch	0.4	170							
Electorate: 65,873 Valid: 38,276 Spoilt: 231 Quota: 9,570 Turnout: 58.5%

=== 2016 general election ===
2016 general election: Laois
Party	Candidate	FPv%	Count		
Party	Candidate	FPv%	1	2	3
Fianna Fáil	Seán Fleming	35.1	13,626		
Fine Gael	Charles Flanagan	21.5	8,370	9,298	9,525
Sinn Féin	Brian Stanley	21.2	8,242	9,562	10,092
Fine Gael	Thomasina Connell	10.9	4,233	4,735	5,140
Labour	John Whelan	7.3	2,856	3,394	3,896
Green	Sinead Moore	4.0	1,541	2,161	
Electorate: 63,295 Valid: 38,868 Spoilt: 352 Quota: 9,718 Turnout: 61.96%

== See also ==
- Dáil constituencies
- Politics of the Republic of Ireland
- Historic Dáil constituencies
- Elections in the Republic of Ireland
