= 2004 Laois County Council election =

Part of the 2004 Irish local elections

- 11 June 2004

All 25 seats on Laois County Council
	First party	Second party	Third party
Party	Fianna Fáil	Fine Gael	Progressive Democrats
Seats won	11	9	1
Seat change	-3	-1	+1
	Fourth party	Fifth party	Sixth party
Party	Labour	Sinn Féin	Independent
Seats won	1	1	2
Seat change	+1	+1	+1
- Map showing the area of Laois County Council
Council control after election
TBD

An election to Laois County Council took place on 11 June 2004 as part of that year's Irish local elections. 25 councillors were elected from five local electoral areas (LEAs) for a five-year term of office on the electoral system of proportional representation by means of the single transferable vote (PR-STV).

== Results by party ==
Party	Seats	±	First Pref. votes	FPv%	±%
Fianna Fáil	11	-3	11,521	37.74	
Fine Gael	9	-1	8,504	27.86	
Progressive Democrats	1	+1	3,072	10.06	
Labour	1	+1	1,250	4.09	
Sinn Féin	1	+1	1,147	3.76	
Independent	2	+1	4,813	15.77	
Totals	25	-	30,527	100.00	—

== Results by local electoral area ==
=== Borris-in-Ossory ===
Borris-in-Ossory - 7 seats
Party	Candidate	FPv%	Count								
Party	Candidate	FPv%	1	2	3	4	5	6	7	8	9
Fianna Fáil	John Joe Fennelly*	14.66	1,341								
Fine Gael	Michael Lalor*	12.85	1,175								
Fianna Fáil	Brendan Phelan*	11.96	1,094	1,109	1,110	1,190					
Fine Gael	John Bonham*	10.65	974	1,011	1,014	1,021	1,021	1,103	1,280		
Labour	Larry Kavanagh	9.45	864	886	897	943	946	979	1,044	1,072	1,125
Fine Gael	John King	8.20	750	753	756	842	853	880	899	913	939
Fine Gael	Marty Phelan*	7.76	710	719	726	746	749	832	899	924	1,025
Fianna Fáil	Bill Delaney*	6.51	595	641	645	702	720	758	786	809	1,039
Independent	Jim Ring	4.83	442	470	471	482	484	529			
Fianna Fáil	Seosamh Murphy	4.59	420	448	448	454	459	545	618	637	
Progressive Democrats	James Walsh	4.28	391	396	396	445	449				
Progressive Democrats	Joseph Hanrahan	4.26	390	394	395						
Electorate: 14,162 Valid: 9,146 (64.58%) Spoilt: 155 Quota: 1,144 Turnout: 9,301 (65.68%)

=== Emo ===
Emo - 4 seats
Party	Candidate	FPv%	Count				
Party	Candidate	FPv%	1	2	3	4	5
Fianna Fáil	Ray Cribbin*	17.17	832	891	919	953	995
Progressive Democrats	Paul Mitchell	15.25	739	749	811	876	931
Fine Gael	James Deegan*	15.08	731	757	874	980	
Fianna Fáil	Michael Costello*	14.44	700	743	766	789	832
Independent	Michael Turley*	11.59	562	606	629	679	918
Independent	Kevin Maher	8.50	412	439	456	523	
Progressive Democrats	Tom Cushen	7.18	348	363	373		
Fine Gael	Trevor Wardrop	5.80	281	285			
Fianna Fáil	Joseph Oakley	4.99	242				
Electorate: 8,110 Valid: 4,847 (59.77%) Spoilt: 82 Quota: 970 Turnout: 4,929 (60.78%)

=== Luggacurren ===
Luggacurren - 4 seats
Party	Candidate	FPv%	Count			
Party	Candidate	FPv%	1	2	3	4
Fine Gael	John Moran*	22.99	1,027			
Fine Gael	James Daly*	18.60	831	894		
Fianna Fáil	Dick Miller	18.09	808	819	846	950
Fianna Fáil	Michael Rice*	18.62	694	733	766	866
Fianna Fáil	Mary Wheatley*	12.36	552	562	582	681
Progressive Democrats	Jimmy Mulhall	7.05	315	341	404	
Green	Matt Diskin	4.93	220	225		
Electorate: 7,301 Valid: 4,467 (61.18%) Spoilt: 89 Quota: 894 Turnout: 4,556 (62.40%)

=== Mountmellick ===
Mountmellick - 4 seats
Party	Candidate	FPv%	Count								
Party	Candidate	FPv%	1	2	3	4	5	6	7	8	9
Fine Gael	David Goodwin*	13.36	671	675	693	807	883	1,096			
Fianna Fáil	Paddy Bracken*	14.23	715	732	747	800	903	914	921	1,143	
Fianna Fáil	Seamus McDonald*	13.32	669	673	710	722	766	844	863	937	992
Fianna Fáil	Michael Moloney	10.93	549	562	576	610	674	685	690	812	864
Fianna Fáil	Joe Digan*	10.55	530	538	559	562	579	709	736	751	782
Independent	Pat Bowe	8.72	438	463	480	516	561	585	618		
Fine Gael	Damien Moran	7.96	400	409	459	520	546				
Progressive Democrats	John Joe Dunne	6.81	342	348	400	432					
Fine Gael	Paddy Buggy	6.61	332	344	369						
Progressive Democrats	Caroline Fitzpatrick-Mulhall	5.00	251	260							
Sinn Féin	John Nelson	2.53	127								
Electorate: 7,036 Valid: 5,024 (71.40%) Spoilt: 71 Quota: 1,005 Turnout: 5,095 (72.41%)

=== Portlaoise ===
Portlaoise - 6 seats
Party	Candidate	FPv%	Count								
Party	Candidate	FPv%	1	2	3	4	5	6	7	8	9
Fine Gael	William Aird*	17.61	1,244								
Sinn Féin	Brian Stanley	14.44	1,020								
Fine Gael	Mary Sweeney*	11.33	800	850	877	906	991	1,073			
Independent	Tom Jacob	9.77	690	723	747	786	804	844	893	904	1,021
Fianna Fáil	Jerry Lodge*	9.44	667	683	696	717	772	809	953	962	1,018
Fianna Fáil	Catherine Fitzgerald*	7.86	555	570	581	598	631	679	772	781	839
Fine Gael	Kathleen O'Brien	6.17	436	497	508	544	555	591	617	640	748
Independent	Rotimi Adebari	5.82	411	420	437	477	481	523	549	556	
Progressive Democrats	Helen Kelly	4.19	296	315	322	333	349				
Fianna Fáil	Jack Nolan	3.96	280	292	303	310	361	388			
Fianna Fáil	Richard Lyons	3.94	278	284	290	297					
Labour	Tom Phelan	2.97	210	213	260						
Labour	John Conroy	2.49	176	186							
Electorate: 12,034 Valid: 7,063 (58.69%) Spoilt: 107 Quota: 1,010 Turnout: 7,170 (59.58%)
