= Laois County Council =

Local authority of County Laois, Ireland

Laois County Council Comhairle Chontae Laoise
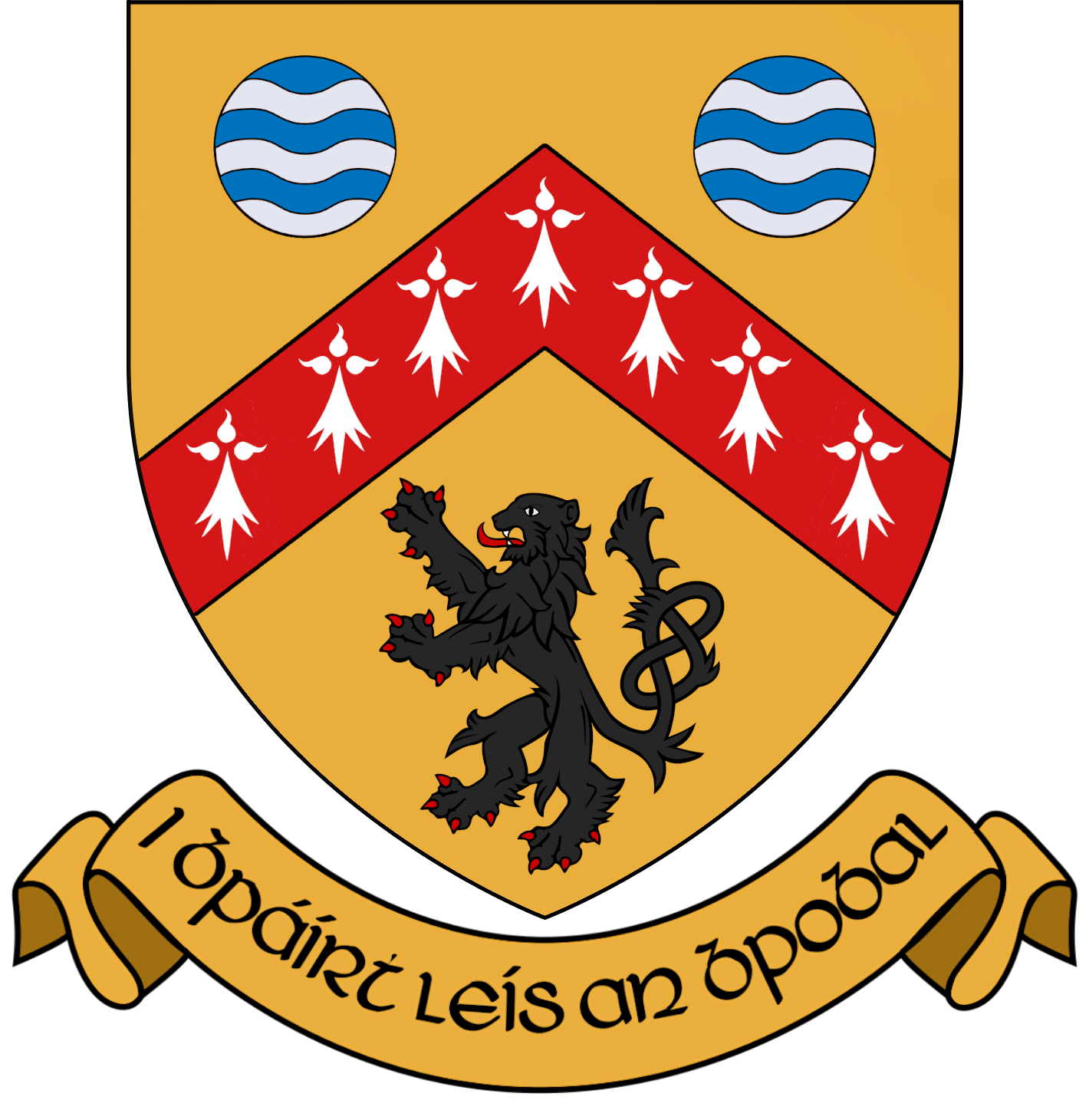

Type
- Type: County council of County Laois

History
- Founded: 1 April 1899

Leadership
- Cathaoirleach: Catherine Fitzgerald, FF

Structure
- Seats: 19
- Political groups: Fianna Fáil (6) Fine Gael (5) Labour (1) Independent (7)

Elections
- Last election: 7 June 2024

Motto
- Irish: I bpáirt leis an bpobal "In partnership with the community"

Meeting place
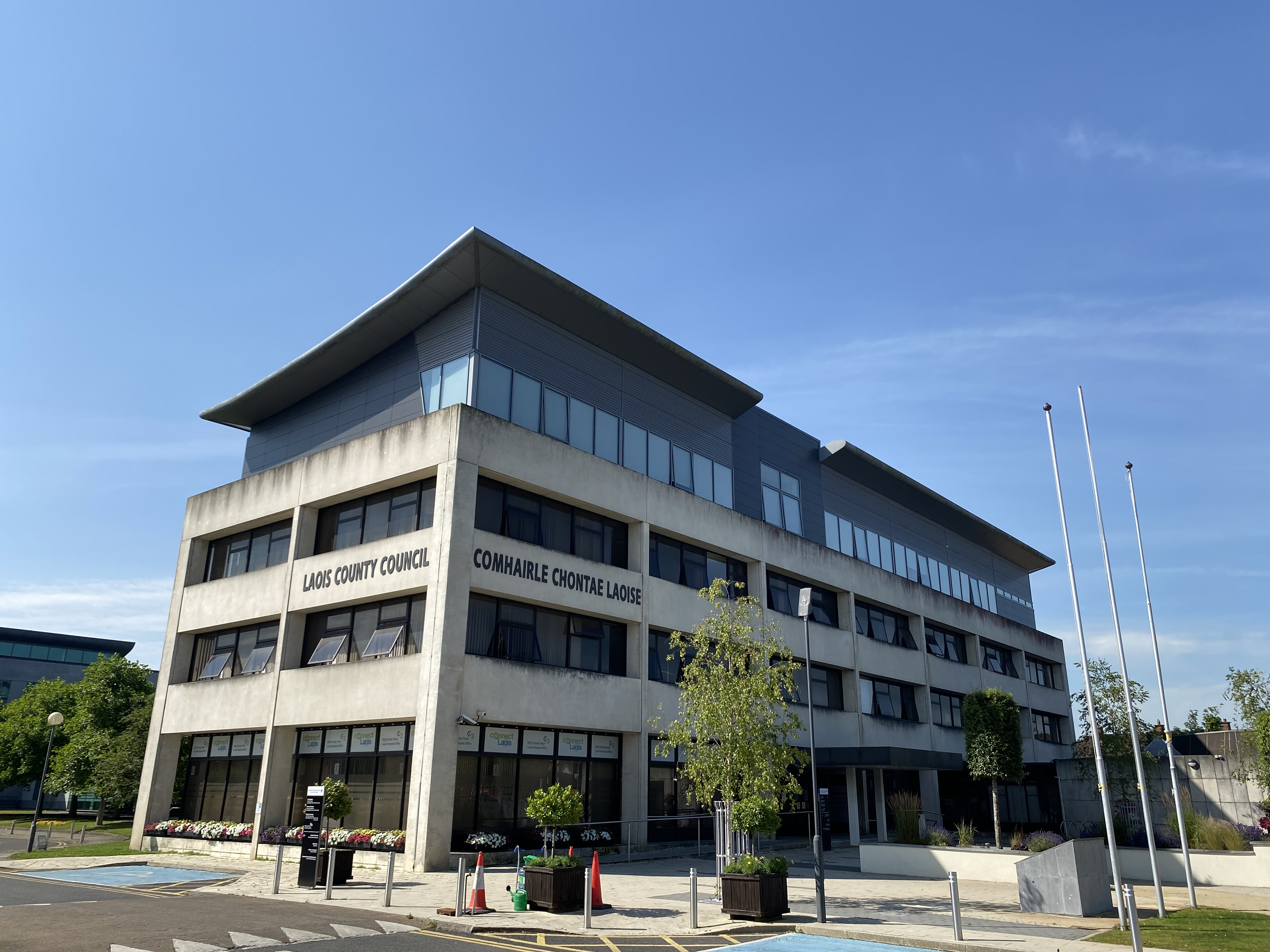
- Áras an Chontae, Portlaoise

Website
- Official website

The area governed by the council

Laois County Council (Irish: Comhairle Chontae Laoise) is the local authority of County Laois, Ireland. As a county council, it is governed by the Local Government Act 2001. The council is responsible for housing and community, roads and transportation, urban planning and development, amenity and culture, and environment. The council has 19 elected members. Elections are held every five years and are by single transferable vote. The head of the council has the title of Cathaoirleach (chairperson). The county administration is headed by a chief executive, Michael Rainey. The county town is Portlaoise.

== History ==
Laois County Council was established on 1 April 1899 under the Local Government (Ireland) Act 1898 for the administrative county of County Laois, then called Queen's County. It included the judicial county of Queen's County except for the part in the town of Carlow, which became part of the administrative county of County Carlow.

Meetings were originally held in Portlaoise Courthouse. After the courthouse became inadequate, a purpose-built facility, known as County Hall was built in May 1982.

== Regional Assembly ==
Laois County Council has two representatives on the Eastern and Midland Regional Assembly who are part of the Midland Strategic Planning Area Committee.

== Elections ==
Members of Laois County Council are elected for a five-year term of office on the electoral system of proportional representation by means of the single transferable vote (PR-STV) from multi-member local electoral areas (LEAs).

Year	FG	FF	SF	Lab	PDs	Ind.	Total
2024	5	6	2	1	—N/a	5	19
2019	7	6	2	1	—N/a	3	19
2014	6	7	2	1	—N/a	3	19
2009	12	8	1	1	—N/a	3	25
2004	9	11	1	1	1	2	25
1999	10	14	0	1	0	1	25
1991	9	13	0	1	1	1	25
1985	9	14	0	1	—N/a	1	25
1979	12	11	0	2	—N/a	0	25
1974	12	11	0	2	—N/a	0	25

== Local electoral areas and municipal districts ==
County Laois is divided into municipal districts and LEAs, defined by electoral divisions.

Municipal District and LEA	Definition	Seats
Borris-in-Ossory–Mountmellick	Aghmacart, Arderin, Ballybrophy, Ballyfin, Borris-in-Ossory, Brisha, Caher, Capard, Cappalough, Cardtown, Castlecuffe, Castletown, Clash, Clonaslee, Clonin, Clonmore, Coolrain, Cuffsborough, Cullahill, Dangans, Donaghmore, Donore, Dunmore, Durrow, Errill, Garrymore, Graigue, Grantstown, Kilcoke, Kildellig, Killermogh, Kilnaseer, Kyle, Kyle South, Lacka, Marymount, Meelick, Moneenalassa, Moneymore, Mountmellick Rural, Mountmellick Urban, Mountrath, Nealstown, OMoresforest, Rathdowney, Rathsaran, Rearymore, Rosenallis, Tinnahinch and Trumra.	6
Graiguecullen–Portarlington	Ardough, Arless, Ballickmoyler, Ballyadams, Ballybrittas, Ballycarroll, Ballylehane, Ballylynan, Barrowhouse, Curraclone, Doonane, Emo, Farnans, Fossy, Graigue Rural, Jamestown, Killabban, Kilmullen, Kilmurry, Luggacurren, Moyanna, Newtown, Portarlington South, Rathaspick, Rossmore, Sallyford, Shrule, Stradbally, Tankardstown, Timahoe, Timogue, Turra and Vicarstown.	6
Portlaoise	Abbeyleix, Ballinakill, Ballyroan, Blandsfort, Borris, Clondarrig, Clonkeen, Colt, Cullenagh, Dysartgallen, Kilcolmanbane, Portlaoighise Rural, Portlaoighise Urban, Raheen and Shaen.	7

== Councillors ==
The following were elected at the 2024 Laois County Council election.

Party	Seats
Fianna Fáil	6
Fine Gael	5
Sinn Féin	2
Labour	1
Independent	5

=== Councillors by electoral area ===
This list reflects the order in which councillors were elected on 7 June 2024.

Council members from 2024 election
Local electoral area	Name	Party
Borris-in-Ossory–Mountmellick	Conor Bergin	Fine Gael
Borris-in-Ossory–Mountmellick	James Kelly	Independent
Borris-in-Ossory–Mountmellick	Paddy Bracken	Fianna Fáil
Borris-in-Ossory–Mountmellick	John King	Fine Gael
Borris-in-Ossory–Mountmellick	Ollie Clooney	Independent
Borris-in-Ossory–Mountmellick	Séamus McDonald	Fianna Fáil
Graiguecullen–Portarlington	Aidan Mullins (Note: Changed party, see table below for details.)	Sinn Féin
Graiguecullen–Portarlington	Paschal McEvoy	Fianna Fáil
Graiguecullen–Portarlington	Ben Brennan	Independent
Graiguecullen–Portarlington	Pádraig Fleming (Note: Replaced during term, see table below for details.)	Fianna Fáil
Graiguecullen–Portarlington	Aisling Moran	Independent
Graiguecullen–Portarlington	Vivienne Phelan	Fine Gael
Portlaoise	William Aird	Fine Gael
Portlaoise	Caroline Dwane-Stanley	Sinn Féin
Portlaoise	Tommy Mulligan	Independent
Portlaoise	John Joe Fennelly	Fianna Fáil
Portlaoise	Catherine Fitzgerald	Fianna Fáil
Portlaoise	Barry Walsh	Fine Gael
Portlaoise	Marie Tuohy	Labour

==== Co-options ====
Party	Outgoing	LEA	Reason	Date	Co-optee
Fine Gael	William Aird	Portlaoise	Elected to 34th Dáil at the 2024 general election	8 December 2024	Paddy Buggy
Fianna Fáil	Pádraig Fleming	Graiguecullen–Portarlington	Retirement	1 April 2026	Elva Kelly

==== Changes in affiliation ====
Name	LEA	Elected as	New affiliation	Date
Aidan Mullins	Graiguecullen–Portarlington	Sinn Féin	Independent	28 August 2024
Caroline Dwane-Stanley	Portlaoise	Sinn Féin	Independent	27 December 2024
