= Borris-in-Ossory =

Village in County Laois, Ireland

Borris-in-Ossory Buiríos Mór Osraí
- Village
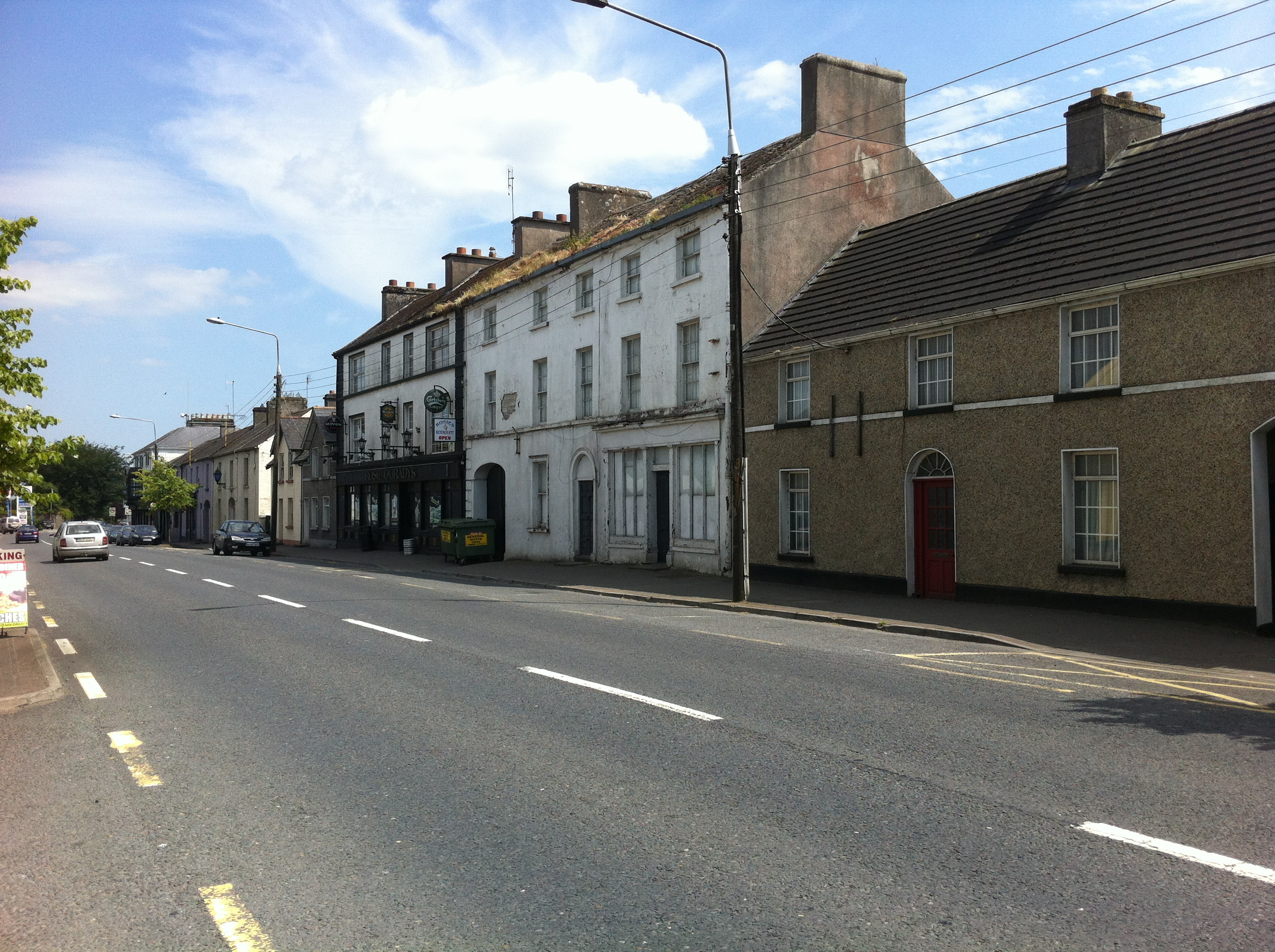
- Main Street

- Location in Ireland
- Coordinates: 52.939°N 7.631°W
- Country: Ireland
- Province: Leinster
- County: County Laois
- Elevation: 105 m (344 ft)

Population (2022)
  - Total: 629
- Irish Grid Reference: S246878

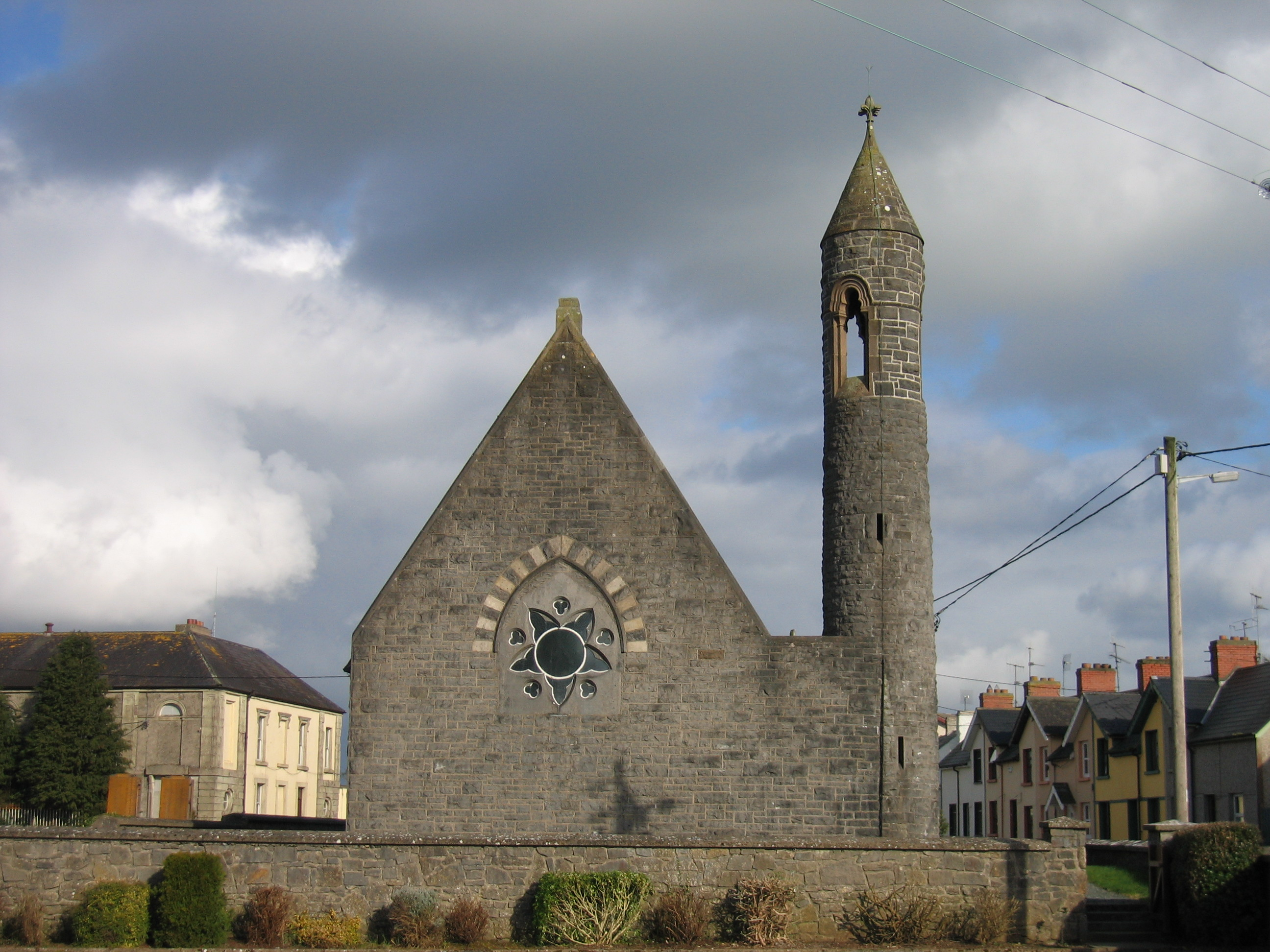
St. Mark's Church of Ireland

Borris-in-Ossory (Irish: Buiríos Mór Osraí, meaning 'the great borough of Ossory', or the 'Burgage of Osraige') is a village in west County Laois, Ireland, close to the Tipperary border and the M7 motorway.

== Features ==
The village has facilities such as a school, churches, community hall, convenience retail outlets and a number of service businesses. The village centre comprises Main Street and includes retail, commercial, institutional, educational and residential functions. Landmark buildings include the Hiberno Romanesque Church of Ireland church of St. Mark, built c.1870, with round tower style bell tower, St. Canice's Church (Roman Catholic), the Ossory of Borris-in-Ossory, and former courthouse. The renovated O’Brien Hall is used as a meeting place for the village's Youth Club and other activities.

== Transport ==
=== Roads ===
The village is on the R445 road between the towns of Mountrath (13 km east along the R445) and Roscrea (12 km west).

During 2009 a motorway junction was constructed to the south of the village in preparation for the westward extension of the M7 motorway. The M7 bypassed the village on 28 May 2010 at Junction 21.

=== Buses ===
The village is served by inter-urban bus links to Dublin, Limerick, Galway, Cork and Carlow, and a town link service connects nearby towns and villages. Long-distance bus passengers were once familiar with Borris-in-Ossory because it served as a refreshment stop, typically 15 minutes at a time.

=== Rail ===
Ballybrophy railway station is located approximately 5 km south of the village. The station is on the main Dublin-Cork railway line at its junction with the Limerick–Ballybrophy railway line.

== Education ==
Convent of Mercy National School currently has five classrooms and is currently preparing plans for a new eight classroom school extension. The school was built in 1965.

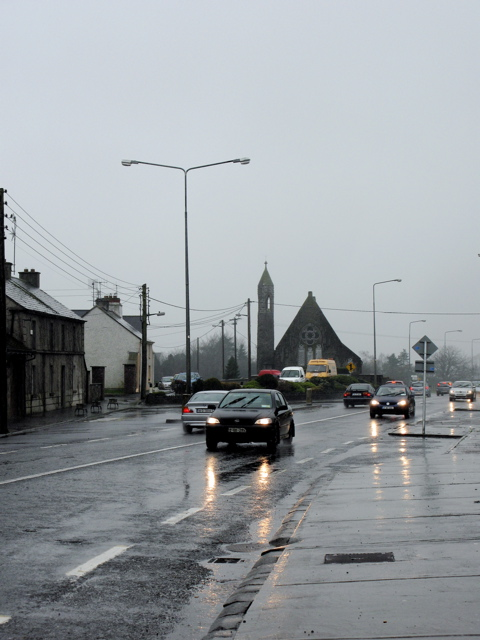
A rainy Monday evening in Borris-in-Ossory

== Religion ==
Churches in the area include St. Canice's (Roman Catholic) and St. Mark's (Church of Ireland), which are both on Borris-in-Ossory's main street.

== Sport ==
The local Gaelic Athletic Association (GAA) club is Borris-in-Ossory GAA. The Gaelic playing fields are located 1.5 km to the east of the village. The amenities include a playing pitch, dressing and meeting rooms. In 2011, the village's GAA club team and the nearby Kilcotton team were amalgamated into one team.

Local soccer club, Grange United FC, also cater for the Borris-in-Ossory area. The playing fields are located in nearby village Killasmeestia. The club was revived in 2023 and currently participate in the NTD&L.

== People ==
- Christy O'Brien (1933–2022), inter-county hurler
- Chris Phelan (1955–2026), rugby league player
- Brian Stanley (b. 1961), politician
- J.J. Sheridan (1951–2014), concert pianist, was born in Borris-in-Ossory.

== See also ==
- List of towns and villages in Ireland
