= William Aird (Fine Gael politician) =

Irish politician

William Aird TD
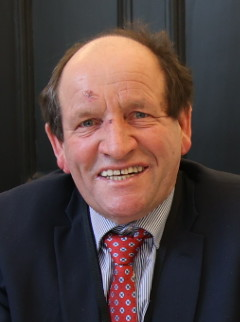
- Aird in 2024

Teachta Dála
- Incumbent
- Assumed office November 2024
- Constituency: Laois

Laois County Councillor
- In office June 1985 – November 2024
- Constituency: Portlaoise

Portlaoise Town Councillor
- In office 1979–2014
- Constituency: Portlaoise

Personal details
- Born: 1959/1960 (age 65–66) County Laois, Ireland
- Party: Fine Gael
- Spouse: Anne Maria Aird
- Relatives: William Aird (grandfather)

William Aird (born 1959/1960) is an Irish Fine Gael politician who has been a Teachta Dála (TD) for the Laois constituency since the 2024 general election.

Aird was elected at the age of 19 to Portlaoise Town Council in 1979, and was a member until its abolition in 2014. He was a member of Laois County Council for the Portlaoise local electoral area from 1985 to 2024.

His grandfather also called William Aird was a Cumann na nGaedheal TD in the 1920s.

Aird is a farmer in Portlaoise, and is married to Anne Maria Aird.

| Dáil | Election | Deputy (Party) | Deputy (Party) | Deputy (Party) |
|---|---|---|---|---|
| 32nd | 2016 | Brian Stanley (SF) | Seán Fleming (FF) | Charles Flanagan (FG) |
| 33rd | 2020 | Constituency abolished. See Laois–Offaly. | | |
| 34th | 2024 | Brian Stanley (Ind.) | Seán Fleming (FF) | William Aird (FG) |
