= 1999 Offaly County Council election =

Part of the 1999 Irish local elections

← 1991	10 June 1999	2004 →

All 21 seats to Offaly County Council
	First party	Second party	Third party
Party	Fianna Fáil	Fine Gael	Labour
Seats won	9	7	1
Seat change	-1	+1	-
	Fourth party	Fifth party
Party	Independent	Progressive Democrats
Seats won	4	0
Seat change	+1	-1
- Map showing the area of Offaly County Council
Council control after election
TBD

An election to Offaly County Council took place on 10 June 1999 as part of that year's Irish local elections. 21 councillors were elected from four local electoral areas for a five-year term of office on the system of proportional representation by means of the single transferable vote (PR-STV).

== Results by party ==
Party	Seats	±	First Pref. votes	FPv%	±%
Fianna Fáil	9	-1	9,880	38.14	
Fine Gael	7	+1	6,879	26.56	
Labour	1	-	2,366	9.13	
Independent	4	+1	6,340	24.48	
Progressive Democrats	0	-1	-	-	
Totals	21	-	25,904	100.00	—

== Results by local electoral area ==
=== Birr ===
Birr - 5 seats
Party	Candidate	FPv%	Count					
Party	Candidate	FPv%	1	2	3	4	5	6
Fine Gael	Olwyn Enright	16.61	1,064					
Independent	Peter Ormond	15.27	978	982	1,073			
Fine Gael	Percy Clendennen*	14.92	956	963	985	1,185		
Fianna Fáil	Senator Pat Moylan*	12.94	829	877	930	1,089		
Independent	John Carroll	9.12	584	597	610	641	665	883
Fianna Fáil	Joe Dooley*	8.65	554	632	732	747	762	937
Independent	Tony McLoughlin	7.63	489	519	529	532	554	
Fine Gael	Tom Rigney	7.02	450	451	455			
Fianna Fáil	Una Collison	4.40	282	297				
Fianna Fáil	James McNamara	3.43	220					
Electorate: 10,685 Valid: 6,406 (59.95%) Spoilt: 85 Quota: 1,068 Turnout: 6,491 (60.75%)

=== Edenderry ===
Edenderry - 5 seats
Party	Candidate	FPv%	Count							
Party	Candidate	FPv%	1	2	3	4	5	6	7	8
Fianna Fáil	Noel Bourke*	26.54	1,465							
Fianna Fáil	Ger Killally	21.42	1,182							
Independent	Frank Weir*	9.13	504	533	553	563	583	637	702	782
Fianna Fáil	Tom Nolan	8.04	444	617	718	721	742	769	866	933
Fine Gael	Emma Jones	7.56	417	427	431	437	444	463		
Fine Gael	Geraldine McGarrigle	6.58	363	378	403	404	409	477	581	
Fine Gael	John Foran	6.12	338	399	415	420	475	507	639	871
Independent	Fergus McDonnell	5.98	330	473	499	506	590	626	636	656
Independent	Peter McNamee	5.00	276	282	323	338	352			
Independent	Tom O'Connell	2.77	153	254	275	282				
Independent	John Owens	0.85	47	54	62					
Electorate: 10,302 Valid: 5,519 (53.57%) Spoilt: 82 Quota: 920 Turnout: 5,601 (54.37%)

=== Ferbane ===
Ferbane - 4 seats
Party	Candidate	FPv%	Count					
Party	Candidate	FPv%	1	2	3	4	5	6
Fine Gael	Connie Hanniffy*	23.46	1,066					
Fianna Fáil	Eamon Dooley*	22.32	1,014					
Fianna Fáil	Tom Feighery*	16.00	727	744	818	867	1,011	
Labour	Timmy Molloy	12.52	569	583	588	650	727	750
Fine Gael	Marcella Corcoran Kennedy	10.54	479	573	588	635	806	859
Independent	Padraig Horan	8.47	385	411	419	510		
Independent	Christy Gannon	6.67	303	309	312			
Electorate: 8,994 Valid: 4,543 (50.51%) Spoilt: 366 Quota: 909 Turnout: 4,909 (54.58%)

=== Tullamore ===
Tullamore - 7 seats
Party	Candidate	FPv%	Count											
Party	Candidate	FPv%	1	2	3	4	5	6	7	8	9	10	11	12
Labour	Pat Gallagher*	16.70	1,591											
Fianna Fáil	Barry Cowen*	11.96	1,139	1,154	1,159	1,188	1,274							
Fine Gael	Tommy McKeigue*	8.48	808	865	871	947	962	963	1,042	1,070	1,096	1,141	1,224	
Fianna Fáil	John Flanagan*	8.44	804	836	846	851	913	954	996	1,018	1,155	1,181	1,521	
Fine Gael	Michael Fox*	7.19	685	701	702	734	775	784	812	819	854	870	909	944
Independent	Thomas Dolan*	6.76	644	652	662	692	699	700	716	803	818	1,036	1,052	1,071
Independent	Molly Buckley	6.37	607	643	648	663	690	694	760	789	807	870	949	986
Independent	Johnny Butterfield*	5.65	538	553	566	572	582	584	606	626	768	792	827	864
Fianna Fáil	Michael Mahon	4.78	455	462	468	471	496	505	510	520				
Sinn Féin	Oliver O'Connor	4.61	439	446	449	458	461	462	485					
Independent	Frank Feery	4.55	433	446	446	478	483	485	511	580	584			
Fianna Fáil	Miriam O'Callaghan*	4.53	432	461	464	473	513	525	571	595	696	726		
Fianna Fáil	Vincent Bermingham	3.50	333	339	341	342								
Labour	Seán O'Brien	3.11	296	443	444	452	457	458						
Fine Gael	Brendan McGowan	2.66	253	264	265									
Independent	John Conroy	0.72	69	70										
Electorate: 17,384 Valid: 9,526 (54.80%) Spoilt: 159 Quota: 1,191 Turnout: 9,685 (55.71%)
