= 2019 Offaly County Council election =

Part of the 2019 Irish local elections

| ← 2014 | 24 May 2019 | 2024 → |

All 19 seats on Offaly County Council 10 seats needed for a majority
| | First party | Second party | Third party |
|---|---|---|---|
| Party | Fianna Fáil | Fine Gael | Renua |
| Seats won | 8 | 4 | 1 |
| Seat change | Steady | ▲1 | ▲1 |
| | Fourth party | Fifth party | Sixth party |
| Party | Irish Democratic | Social Democrats | Green |
| Seat change | ▲1 | ▲1 | ▲1 |
- Results by local electoral area

An election to all 19 seats on Offaly County Council was held on 24 May 2019 as part of the 2019 Irish local elections. County Offaly was divided into 3 local electoral areas (LEAs) to elect councillors for a five-year term of office on the electoral system of proportional representation by means of the single transferable vote (PR-STV).

== Boundary review ==
The 2018 LEA Boundary Review Committee recommended no changes to the LEAs used in the 2014 elections.

== Results by party ==
| Party | Seats | ± | 1st pref | FPv% | ±% |
|---|---|---|---|---|---|
| Fianna Fáil | 8 | Steady | 12,423 | 39.95 | ▲5.85 |
| Fine Gael | 4 | ▲1 | 6,730 | 21.64 | ▲4.84 |
| Renua | 1 | ▲1 | 3,196 | 10.28 | New |
| Irish Democratic | 1 | ▲1 | 1,054 | 3.39 | New |
| Social Democrats | 1 | ▲1 | 657 | 2.11 | New |
| Green | 1 | ▲1 | 584 | 1.88 | ▲1.70 |
| Sinn Féin | 0 | ▼3 | 1,423 | 4.58 | ▼12.62 |
| Independent | 3 | ▼2 | 5,028 | 16.17 | ▼13.73 |
| Total | 19 | Steady | 31,095 | 100.00 | |

== Results by local electoral area ==
*: Outgoing councillor elected in 2014.
†: Outgoing councillor coopted subsequent to the 2014 election.

=== Birr ===
Birr: 6 seats
| Party | Candidate | FPv% | Count | | | | | | | | | |
| Party | Candidate | FPv% | 1 | 2 | 3 | 4 | 5 | 6 | 7 | 8 | 9 | 10 |
|---|---|---|---|---|---|---|---|---|---|---|---|---|
| Renua | John Leahy (Note: See change below.) | 19.22% | 2,277 | | | | | | | | | |
| Fianna Fáil | Peter Ormond | 14.60% | 1,729 | | | | | | | | | |
| Fine Gael | John Clendennen | 11.23% | 1,330 | 1,408 | 1,417 | 1,551 | 1,580 | 1,665 | 1,676 | 1,717 | | |
| Fianna Fáil | Eamon Dooley | 9.39% | 1,112 | 1,181 | 1,183 | 1,185 | 1,247 | 1,269 | 1,275 | 1,293 | 1,439 | 1,633 |
| Independent | John Carroll | 8.41% | 996 | 1,018 | 1,030 | 1,059 | 1,084 | 1,161 | 1,116 | 1,346 | 1,447 | 1,770 |
| Fine Gael | Hughie Egan | 7.40% | 877 | 934 | 936 | 970 | 981 | 994 | 994 | 1,004 | 1,129 | 1,156 |
| Fianna Fáil | Bernie Fanneran | 6.04% | 715 | 731 | 739 | 783 | 839 | 884 | 893 | 985 | 1,031 | |
| Social Democrats | Clare Claffey | 5.55% | 657 | 712 | 731 | 745 | 894 | 940 | 942 | 1,036 | 1,159 | 1,300 |
| Sinn Féin | Seán Maher | 4.55% | 539 | 559 | 572 | 593 | 608 | 640 | 642 | | | |
| Independent | Joe Wynne | 4.22% | 500 | 573 | 580 | 593 | 620 | 681 | 682 | 737 | | |
| Fianna Fáil | Alan Kenny | 3.26% | 386 | 412 | 412 | 418 | | | | | | |
| Fine Gael | Marian Pilkington | 2.76% | 327 | 338 | 352 | | | | | | | |
| Renua | Monica Barnwell | 2.52% | 298 | 452 | 461 | 489 | 498 | | | | | |
| Independent | Habibul Mukhtiar | 0.86% | 102 | 105 | | | | | | | | |
Electorate: 21,198 Valid: 11,845 Spoilt: 160 Quota: 1,693 Turnout: 12,005 (56.63%)

=== Edenderry ===
Edenderry: 6 seats
| Party | Candidate | FPv% | Count | | | | | | |
| Party | Candidate | FPv% | 1 | 2 | 3 | 4 | 5 | 6 | 7 |
|---|---|---|---|---|---|---|---|---|---|
| Fianna Fáil | Eddie Fitzpatrick | 20.89% | 1,714 | | | | | | |
| Independent | John Foley | 17.85% | 1,464 | | | | | | |
| Fine Gael | Liam Quinn | 11.24% | 922 | 981 | 1,025 | 1,053 | 1,222 | | |
| Fine Gael | Noel Cribbin | 9.58% | 786 | 834 | 871 | 956 | 963 | 972 | 1,068 |
| Fianna Fáil | Robert McDermott | 8.24% | 676 | 724 | 771 | 957 | 1,187 | | |
| Sinn Féin | Alan Davy | 7.28% | 597 | 629 | 664 | 690 | 718 | 727 | |
| Green | Pippa Hackett | 7.12% | 584 | 629 | 739 | 787 | 840 | 860 | 991 |
| Independent | Fergus McDonnell | 6.72% | 551 | 570 | 626 | 705 | 746 | 758 | 948 |
| Fianna Fáil | Christine Traynor | 5.55% | 455 | 546 | 590 | | | | |
| Fianna Fáil | Pat Daly | 5.53% | 454 | 567 | 573 | 648 | | | |
Electorate: 16,809 Valid: 8,203 Spoilt: 141 Quota: 1,172 Turnout: 8,344 (49.64%)

=== Tullamore ===
Tullamore: 7 seats
| Party | Candidate | FPv% | Count | | | | | | | |
| Party | Candidate | FPv% | 1 | 2 | 3 | 4 | 5 | 6 | 7 | 8 |
|---|---|---|---|---|---|---|---|---|---|---|
| Fianna Fáil | Frank Moran | 13.92% | 1,538 | | | | | | | |
| Fianna Fáil | Declan Harvey | 12.84% | 1,418 | | | | | | | |
| Fine Gael | Neil Feighery | 11.08% | 1,224 | 1,229 | 1,240 | 1,350 | 1,352 | 1,435 | | |
| Fianna Fáil | Danny Owens | 10.70% | 1,182 | 1,219 | 1,228 | 1,263 | 1,269 | 1,346 | 1,356 | 1,472 |
| Irish Democratic | Ken Smollen | 9.54% | 1,054 | 1,089 | 1,139 | 1,194 | 1,197 | 1,301 | 1,305 | 1,428 |
| Fianna Fáil | Tony McCormack | 9.45% | 1,044 | 1,066 | 1,081 | 1,162 | 1,175 | 1,227 | 1,230 | 1,328 |
| Independent | Sean O'Brien | 8.07% | 892 | 897 | 945 | 1,018 | 1,023 | 1,089 | 1,097 | 1,231 |
| Fine Gael | Deirdre Fox | 6.63% | 732 | 738 | 757 | 850 | 853 | 896 | 921 | 1,007 |
| Renua | Brendan Galvin | 5.62% | 621 | 624 | 644 | 674 | 677 | 728 | 732 | |
| Fine Gael | Bernard Westman | 4.82% | 532 | 537 | 552 | | | | | |
| Independent | John Bracken | 4.73% | 523 | 557 | 609 | 636 | 638 | | | |
| Sinn Féin | Anne Marie Ennis | 2.60% | 287 | 292 | | | | | | |
Electorate: 21,946 Valid: 11,047 Spoilt: 161 Quota: 1,381 Turnout: 11,208 (51.07%)

== Results by gender ==
2019 Offaly County Council election Candidates by gender
| Gender | Number of candidates | % of candidates | Elected councillors | % of councillors |
|---|---|---|---|---|
| Men | 28 | 77.8% | 17 | 89.5% |
| Women | 8 | 22.2% | 2 | 10.5% |
| TOTAL | 36 | | 19 | |

== Changes after 2019 ==
=== Changes in affiliation ===
| Name | LEA | Elected as | New affiliation | Date |
|---|---|---|---|---|
| John Leahy | Birr | Renua | Independent | 11 June 2019 |
| Ken Smollen | Tullamore | Irish Democratic | Independent | October 2020 |

=== Co-options ===
| Party | Outgoing | LEA | Reason | Date | Co-optee |
|---|---|---|---|---|---|
| Green | Pippa Hackett | Edenderry | Elected to the 25th Seanad on the Agricultural Panel on 1 November 2019 | 19 November 2019 | Mark Hackett |
| Independent | Ken Smollen | Tullamore | Ill health | 19 September 2023 | Sandy Feehan-Smollen |
