= 2024 Offaly County Council election =

Part of the 2024 Irish local elections

← 2019	7 June 2024	2029 →

All 19 seats on Offaly County Council 10 seats needed for a majority
- Area of Offaly County Council

An election to all 19 seats on Offaly County Council was held on 7 June 2024 as part of the 2024 Irish local elections. County Offaly is divided into 3 local electoral areas (LEAs) to elect councillors for a five-year term of office on the electoral system of proportional representation by means of the single transferable vote (PR-STV).

== Results by party ==
Party	Candidates	Seats	±	1st pref	FPv%	±%
Fianna Fáil	10	8	Steady	12,603	38.89	-1.06
Fine Gael	5	5	▲1	6,652	20.53	-1.11
Sinn Féin	5	3	▲3	3,186	9.83	+5.25
Independent Ireland	1	1	New	1,320	4.07	New
Social Democrats	2	0	▼1	1,220	3.77	+1.66
Green	3	0	▼1	807	2.49	+0.61
Irish Freedom	1	0	New	418	1.29	New
Aontú	1	0	New	191	0.59	New
Independent	9	2	▼1	6,006	18.53	+2.36
Total	37	19	Steady	32,403	100.00	

== Results by local electoral area ==
*: Outgoing councillor elected in 2019.
†: Outgoing councillor coopted subsequent to the 2019 election.

=== Birr ===
Birr: 6 Seats
Party	Candidate	FPv%	Count											
Party	Candidate	FPv%	1	2	3	4	5	6	7	8	9	10	11	12
Fianna Fáil	Peter Ormond	16.22%	1,943											
Independent	John Leahy	15.15%	1,815											
Fine Gael	John Clendennen	13.03%	1,562	1,644	1,666	1,677	1,708	1,782						
Fine Gael	Hugh Egan	9.77%	1,171	1,176	1,185	1,185	1,196	1,206	1,307	1,378	1,393	1,458	1,877	
Sinn Féin	Sean Maher	7.74%	927	943	949	957	981	1,055	1,088	1,113	1,137	1,236	1,264	1,282
Fianna Fáil	Barbara Daly	7.34%	879	895	905	905	916	918	979	1,012	1,012	1,047		
Fianna Fáil	Audrey Hennessy-Kennedy	6.92%	829	907	916	923	940	1,022	1,039	1,083	1,110	1,212	1,507	1,573
Social Democrats	Clare Claffey	5.03%	603	609	618	624	700	734	785	901	913	1,089	1,175	1,256
Independent	Jonathan O'Meara	4.62%	554	561	570	577	622	671	727	880	881			
Independent	Mike Boylan	4.03%	483	486	493	499	548	578	645					
Independent	Martin Buckley	3.58%	429	431	443	444	459	470						
Independent	Michael Deegan	3.17%	380	385	388	402	425							
Aontú	Aubrey Claffey	1.59%	191	194	198	199								
Green	Ekaterina Koneva	1.19%	143	147	148	153								
Independent	Garrett Kelly	0.59%	71	75	76									
Electorate: 22,379 Valid: 11,980 Spoilt: 159 Quota: 1,712 Turnout: 12,139 (54.24%)

=== Edenderry ===
Edenderry: 6 Seats
Party	Candidate	FPv%	Count					
Party	Candidate	FPv%	1	2	3	4	5	6
Fianna Fáil	Eddie Fitzpatrick†	22.83%	1,998					
Independent Ireland	Fergus McDonnell	15.08%	1,320					
Fianna Fáil	Claire Murray	12.96%	1,134	1,361				
Fine Gael	Liam Quinn	12.18%	1,066	1,156	1,172	1,179	1,271	
Fine Gael	Noel Cribben	10.18%	891	978	987	992	1,043	1,185
Sinn Féin	Claire Murray	7.40%	648	709	716	884	912	1,128
Social Democrats	John McNamee	7.05%	617	639	641	650	692	
Fianna Fáil	Robert McDermott	7.01%	614	757	817	820	867	1,112
Green	Mark Hackett	3.08%	270	362	371	380		
Sinn Féin	Rory Ryan	2.22%	194	219	226			
Electorate: 18,340 Valid: 8,752 Spoilt: 133 Quota: 1,251 Turnout: 8,885 (48.45%)

=== Tullamore ===
Tullamore: 7 Seats
Party	Candidate	FPv%	Count					
Party	Candidate	FPv%	1	2	3	4	5	6
Fine Gael	Neil Feighery	16.81%	1,962					
Fianna Fáil	Frank Moran	12.24%	1,429	1,450	1,459			
Independent	Sean O'Brien	11.45%	1,337	1,393	1,445	1,538		
Fianna Fáil	Tony McCormack	11.36%	1,326	1,422	1,429	1,509		
Fianna Fáil	Declan Harvey	10.87%	1,269	1,339	1,357	1,415	1,441	1,466
Sinn Féin	Aoife Masterson	10.42%	1,216	1,267	1,418	1,483		
Fianna Fáil	Ollie Bryant	10.13%	1,182	1,308	1,323	1,373	1,388	1,408
Independent	Sandy Feehan-Smollen	6.70%	782	808	863	895	913	916
Irish Freedom	Paddy Broder	4.12%	418	423	449	453	454	456
Green	Liam Walsh	3.37%	394	425	435			
Sinn Féin	Tim Farrell	1.72%	201	204				
Independent	Deirdre Dillon	1.33%	155	173				
Electorate: 23,791 Valid: 11,671 Spoilt: 162 Quota: 1,459 Turnout: 11,833 (49.74%)

=== Changes since 2024 ===
- †Fianna Fáil Edenderry Cllr Eddie Fitzpatrick resigned from the party and became an Independent on 8 October 2024.
