= 1991 Offaly County Council election =

Part of the 1991 Irish local elections

- 27 June 1991

All 21 seats on Offaly County Council
	First party	Second party	Third party
Party	Fianna Fáil	Fine Gael	Labour
Seats won	10	6	1
Seat change	-2	0	+1
	Fourth party	Fifth party
Party	Progressive Democrats	Independent
Seats won	1	3
Seat change	+1	0
- Map showing the area of Offaly County Council
Council control after election
TBD

An election to Offaly County Council took place on 27 June 1991 as part of that year's Irish local elections. 21 councillors were elected from five local electoral areas (LEAs) for a five-year term of office on the electoral system of proportional representation by means of the single transferable vote (PR-STV). This term was extended twice, first to 1998, then to 1999.

== Results by party ==
Party	Seats	±	First Pref. votes	FPv%	±%
Fianna Fáil	10	-2	10,232	41.39	
Fine Gael	6	0	7,699	31.14	
Labour	1	+1	1,686	6.82	
Progressive Democrats	1	+1	1,015	4.11	
Independent	3	0	3,221	13.03	
Totals	21	0	24,722	100.00	—

== Results by local electoral area ==
=== Birr ===
Birr - 5 seats
Party	Candidate	FPv%	Count							
Party	Candidate	FPv%	1	2	3	4	5	6	7	8
Fine Gael	Tom Enright TD*	15.5%	924	966	1,076					
Fianna Fáil	Pat Moylan*	13.2%	789	823	898	908	1,010			
Fine Gael	Percy Clendennen	12.4%	742	760	801	820	876	896	904	906
Fianna Fáil	Seamus Loughnane*	11.4%	681	725	794	813	1,037			
Fianna Fáil	Pat McLoughney	11%	658	689	732	740				
Fine Gael	Joe Clear*	11%	657	678	749	759	873	896	904	907
Fianna Fáil	Joe Dooley*	10.7%	635	688	796	812	999			
Sinn Féin	John Carroll	9.6%	570	601						
Independent	Neayvn Kavanagh	5.1%	304							
Electorate: 9,171 Valid: 5,960 (64.99%) Spoilt: 41 Quota: 994 Turnout: 6,001 (65.43%)

=== Edenderry ===
Edenderry - 5 seats
Party	Candidate	FPv%	Count							
Party	Candidate	FPv%	1	2	3	4	5	6	7	8
Fine Gael	Michael Fox*	15.6%	915	917	937	1,038				
Independent	James Flanagan*	13.6%	795	844	870	910	942	951	1,194	656
Fianna Fáil	Frank Weir	12.3%	718	718	791	806	894	898	920	926
Fianna Fáil	Noel Bourke	11.6%	681	701	713	733	746	752	904	982
Fianna Fáil	Paddy Scully*	11.6%	677	678	684	709	728	747	773	781
Progressive Democrats	Tom O'Connell	9.9%	579	597	608	642	660	673		
Progressive Democrats	Brigid Emerson	7.4%	436	438	506	541	675	685	832	867
Fine Gael	Jack Dunne	6.2%	361	363	388	425				
Green	Anthony Dolan	5.1%	299	305	333					
Labour	Sean Coughlan	4.9%	289	292						
Independent	William Brereton	1.9%	111							
Electorate: 10,007 Valid: 5,861 (58.57%) Spoilt: 73 Quota: 977 Turnout: 5,934 (59.3%)

=== Ferbane ===
Ferbane - 5 seats
Party	Candidate	FPv%	Count			
Party	Candidate	FPv%	1	2	3	4
Fine Gael	Connie Hanniffy*	22.4%	1,183			
Fianna Fáil	Eamon Dooley*	18.3%	966			
Independent	Johnny Butterfield*	15.7%	829	886		
Fianna Fáil	Tom Feighery*	12.8%	680	695	804	848
Fine Gael	Bernard Corcoran*	12.7%	673	840	1,061	
Fianna Fáil	Patrick Mahon*	10.3%	544	562	602	608
Fine Gael	Pat Troy	7.9%	417	460		
Electorate: 8,914 Valid: 5,292 (59.37%) Spoilt: 55 Quota: 883 Turnout: 5,347 (59.98%)

=== Tullamore ===
Tullamore - 6 seats
Party	Candidate	FPv%	Count								
Party	Candidate	FPv%	1	2	3	4	5	6	7	8	9
Fianna Fáil	Brian Cowen TD*	15%	1,141								
Fianna Fáil	John Flanagan*	12.5%	953	965	981	994	1,018	1,072	1,113		
Independent	Thomas Dolan*	11.1%	844	860	875	879	902	926	950	966	1,013
Fine Gael	Tommy McKeigue	10.9%	830	854	855	882	913	946	1,057	1,118	
Labour	Pat Gallagher	9.5%	722	742	743	808	842	894	921	1,099	
Fine Gael	Frank Feery*	9.3%	708	712	719	722	724	737	798	810	848
Fianna Fáil	Miriam O'Callaghan*	9.3%	706	722	729	747	781	797	816	851	1,076
Fianna Fáil	Michael Lynam	5.3%	403	405	408	412	422	430	441	448	
Fine Gael	Kevin Wrafter	3.8%	289	298	299	304	309	310			
Labour	Laurence Byrne	3.3%	250	258	259	270	280				
Labour	Ernest McGuire	2.9%	223	232	233	265	292	360	368		
Labour	Seán O'Brien	2.7%	202	204	204						
Independent	Anne O'Toole	2.5%	193	207	207	219					
Independent	Peadar Keeley	1%	78								
Independent	May Keeley	0.5%	41								
Independent	Nellie Gaffney	0.3%	26	70							
Electorate: 12,610 Valid: 7,609 (60.34%) Spoilt: 64 Quota: 1,088 Turnout: 7,673 (60.85%)
