= 1985 Offaly County Council election =

Part of the 1985 Irish local elections

- 20 June 1985

All 21 seats on Offaly County Council
	First party	Second party	Third party
Party	Fianna Fáil	Fine Gael	Independent
Seats won	12	6	3
Seat change	+2	-3	+2
	Fourth party
Party	Labour
Seats won	0
Seat change	-1
- Map showing the area of Offaly County Council
Council control after election
Fianna Fail

An election to Offaly County Council took place on 20 June 1985 as part of the Irish local elections. 21 councillors were elected from four local electoral areas (LEAs) for a five-year term of office on the electoral system of proportional representation by means of the single transferable vote (PR-STV). This term was extended for a further year, to 1991.

== Results by party ==
Party	Seats	±	First Pref. votes	FPv%	±%
Fianna Fáil	12	+2	13,280	49.78	
Fine Gael	6	-3	8,673	32.48	
Independent	3	+2	3,304	12.37	
Labour	0	-1	1,090	4.08	
Totals	21	-	24,722	100.00	—

== Results by local electoral area ==
=== Birr ===
Birr: 5 seats
Party	Candidate	FPv%	Count							
Party	Candidate	FPv%	1	2	3	4	5	6	7	8
Fianna Fáil	Pat Moylan		1,049	1,059	1,059	1,088	1,171			
Fianna Fáil	Michelle Hoolan		835	840	909	924	940	941	971	994
Fine Gael	Tom Enright TD*		827	883	955	982	1,182			
Fianna Fáil	Joe Dooley*		788	806	810	875	908	910	1,030	1,086
Fine Gael	Joe Clear*		724	734	807	822	887	908	1,318	
Fianna Fáil	Seamus Loughnane*		680	709	718	781	788	795	838	865
Fine Gael	Percy Clendennen*		523	540	564	595	685	723		
Fine Gael	Padraig Horan		447	482	515	538				
Sinn Féin	Patrick Grogan		299	308	308					
Fine Gael	Patrick Collison		289	293						
Labour	Fred Ryan		214							
Electorate: 9,040 Valid: 6,675 (74.99%) Spoilt: 104 Quota: 1,113 Turnout: 6,779

=== Edenderry ===
Edenderry: 5 seats
Party	Candidate	FPv%	Count				
Party	Candidate	FPv%	1	2	3	4	5
Fianna Fáil	Ger Connolly TD*		1,787				
Fine Gael	Michael Fox*		843	864	876	1,015	1,029
Independent	James Flanagan*		772	868	884	1,095	
Fine Gael	Donal Dunne*		753	794	837	925	941
Fianna Fáil	Patrick Gorman*		730	1,088			
Fianna Fáil	Paddy Scully*		724	872	893	977	994
Fine Gael	Paul O'Kelly		321	349	352		
Independent	Eileen O'Connor		211	243	266		
Independent	Eugene Mulligan		141	156			
Electorate: 10,162 Valid: 6,282 (62.99%) Spoilt: 119 Quota: 1,048 Turnout: 6,401

=== Ferbane ===
Ferbane: 5 seats
Party	Candidate	FPv%	Count			
Party	Candidate	FPv%	1	2	3	4
Fianna Fáil	Eamon Dooley*		1,223			
Fine Gael	Connie Hanniffy*		1,075			
Fianna Fáil	Tom Feighery*		894	1,075		
Fianna Fáil	Patrick Mahon		723	773	786	953
Fine Gael	Bernard Corcoran*		700	740	840	936
Fine Gael	Attracta Dooley		552	557	608	703
Independent	Seamus Boland		442	453	472	
Electorate: 8,741 Valid: 5,673 (65.7%) Spoilt: 70 Quota: 946 Turnout: 5,743

=== Tullamore ===
Tullamore: 6 seats
Party	Candidate	FPv%	Count														
Party	Candidate	FPv%	1	2	3	4	5	6	7	8	9	10	11	12	13	14	15
Fianna Fáil	Brian Cowen TD*		1,844														
Fianna Fáil	John Flanagan		832	1,046	1,054	1,067	1,130	1,155									
Independent	Johnny Butterfield*		812	830	840	849	856	872	873	899	917	953	987	1,054	1,118	1,289	
Fine Gael	Frank Feery*		672	782	787	800	803	809	809	819	832	876	969	1,015	1,029	1,047	1,057
Independent	Thomas Dolan		526	645	646	657	669	675	675	678	686	691	698	720	742	824	861
Fianna Fáil	Patrick Mitchell		452	480	482	483	513	515	515	523	603	647	668	694	945	991	999
Independent	May Keeley		400	412	414	430	435	455	455	497	524	537	552	625	650		
Fine Gael	Ian Lee		353	356	366	367	377	385	385	400	413	492	679	716	789	837	851
Fianna Fáil	Michael Lynam		336	405	407	414	427	427	427	430	494	500	516	545			
Fine Gael	Peter Kelly		301	305	308	312	322	327	327	338	344						
Fine Gael	Bernadette Owens		293	297	303	305	309	327	327	348	366	436					
Labour	Laurence Byrne*		259	273	280	306	310	342	343	438	455	471	490				
Fianna Fáil	Miriam O'Callaghan		209	238	243	247	285	296	296	315							
Labour	Ernest McGuire		191	196	216	241	245	294	294								
Labour	Vincent Wynter		184	186	208	216	217										
Fianna Fáil	Ann Mansoor		164	200	204	206											
Labour	Seán O'Brien		125	127													
Labour	John O'Dwyer		117	139	149												
Electorate: 12,194 Valid: 8,070 (67.55%) Spoilt: 167 Quota: 1,153 Turnout: 8,237
