= 2019 Irish local elections =

Nationwide local authority elections

← 2014	24 May 2019	2024 →

949 County and City Council Seats
- Opinion polls
- Turnout: 50.12% ▼1.58pp
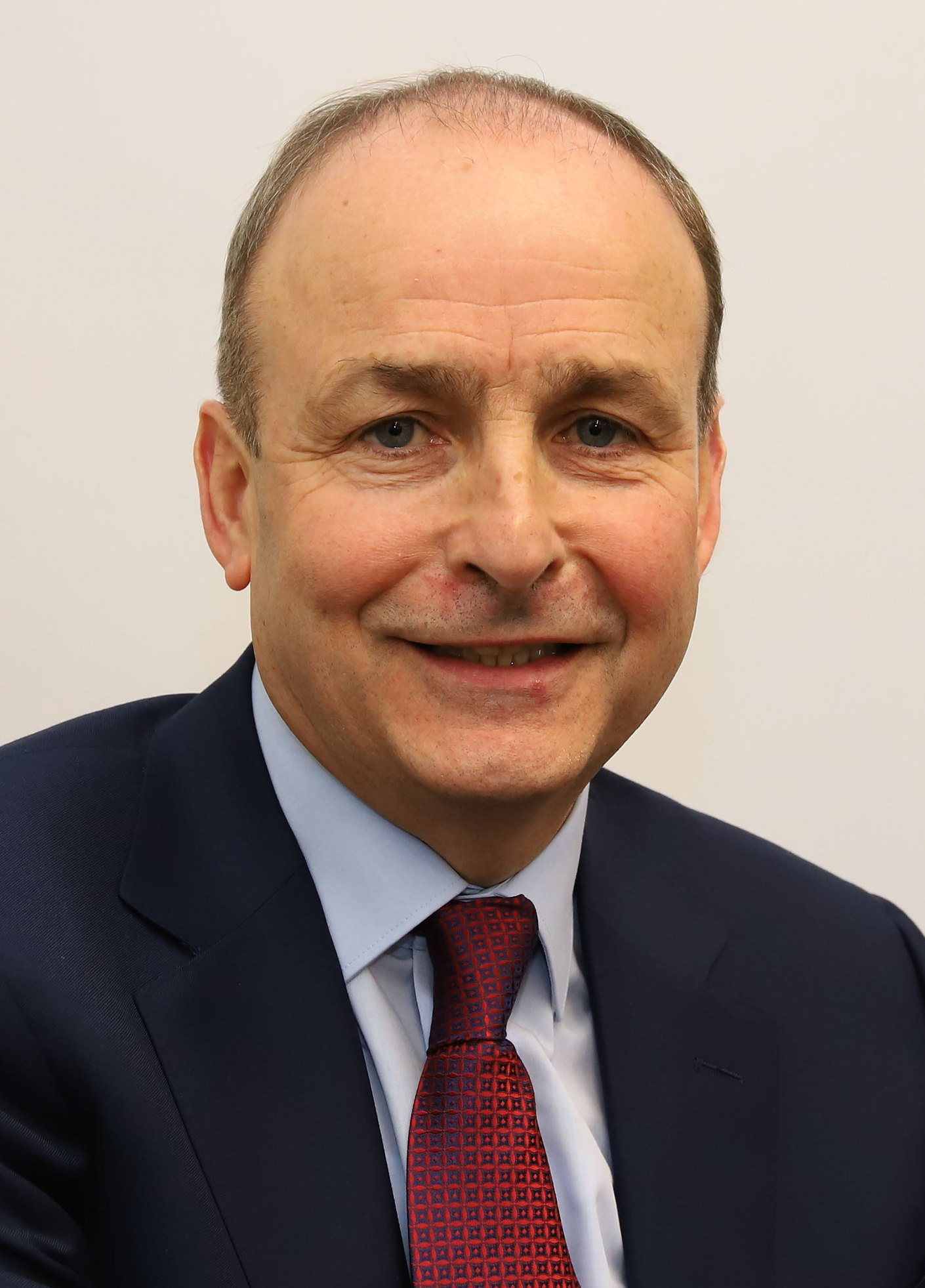

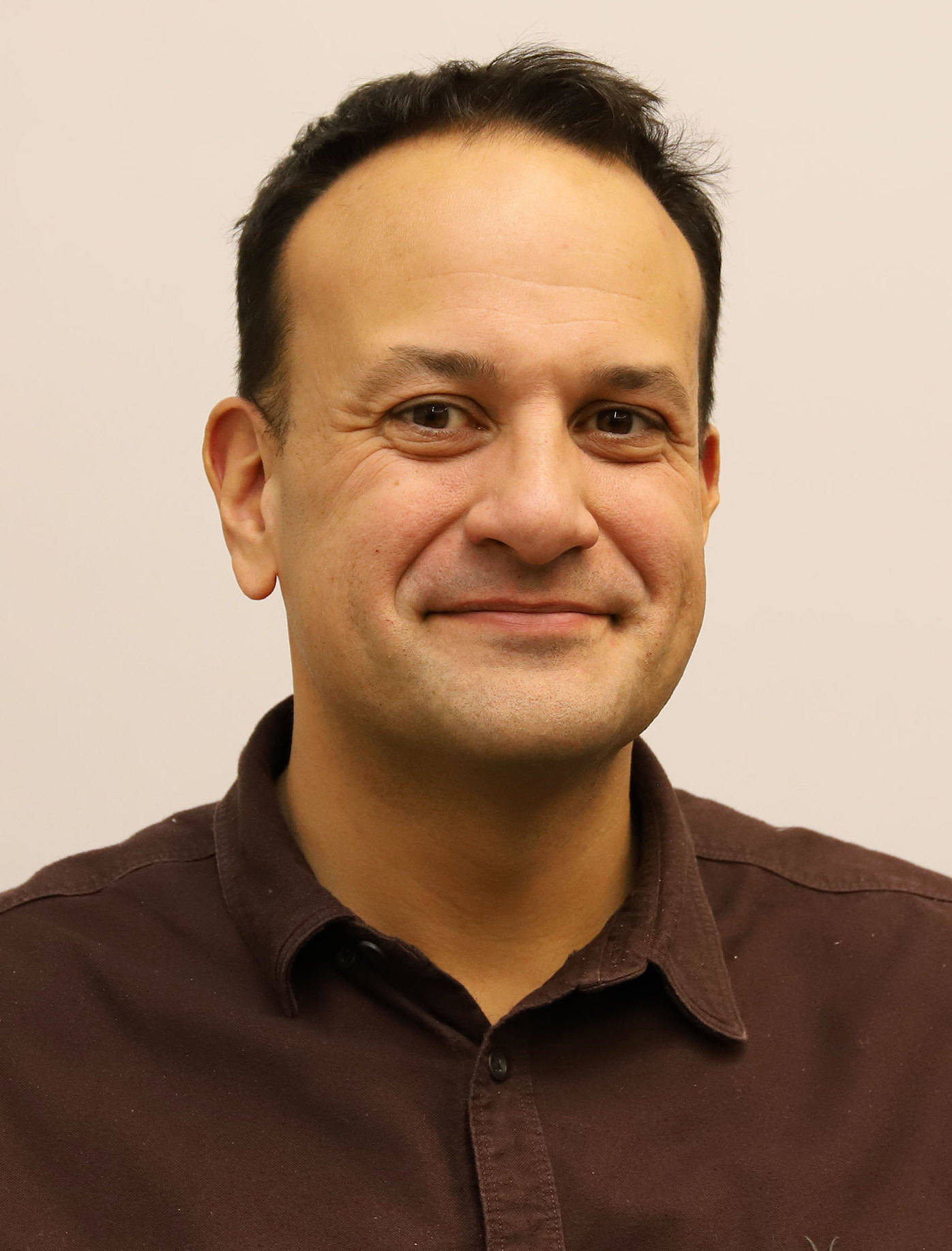

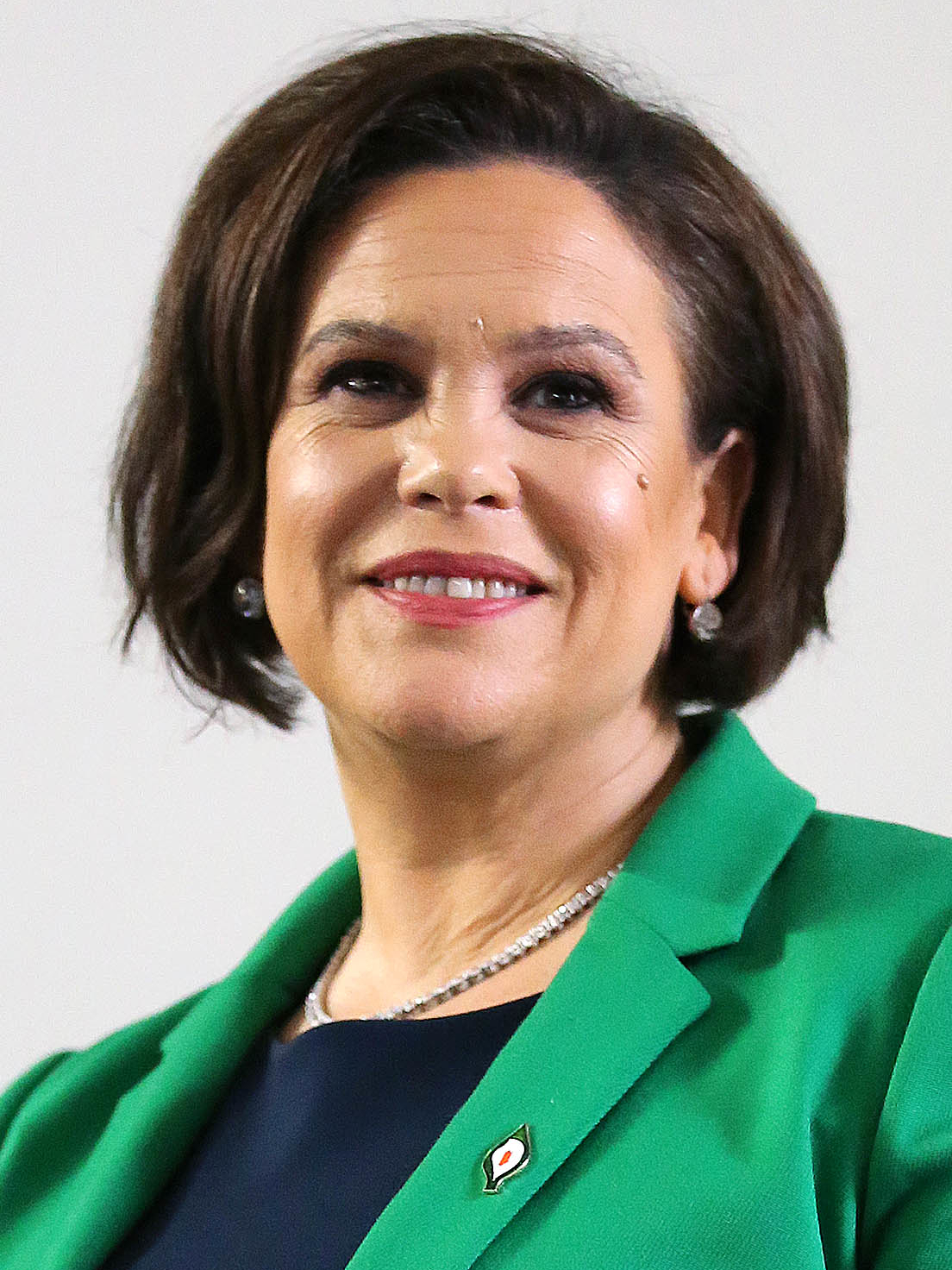

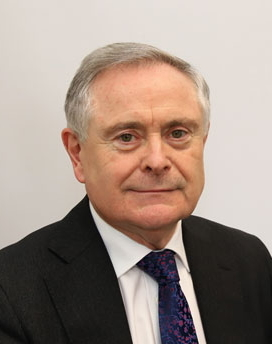

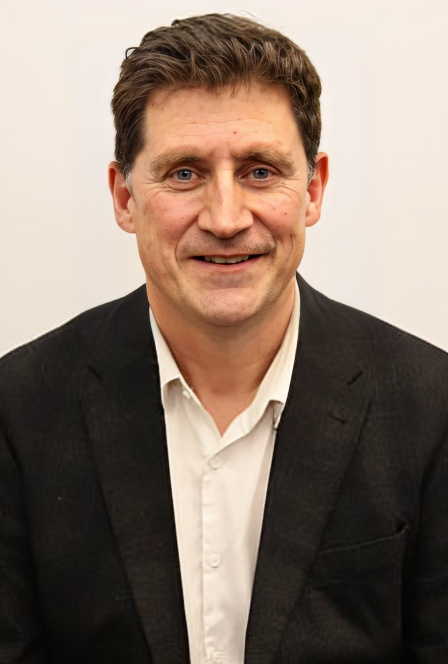

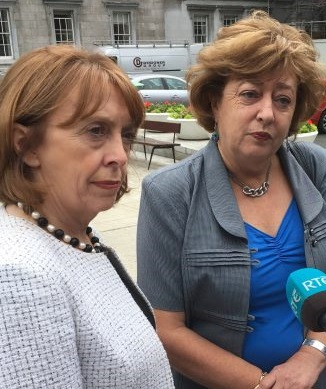

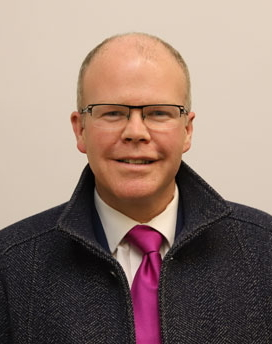
	First party	Second party	Third party
Leader	Micheál Martin	Leo Varadkar	Mary Lou McDonald
Party	Fianna Fáil	Fine Gael	Sinn Féin
Leader since	26 January 2011	2 June 2017	10 February 2018
Last election	267	235	159
Seats won	279	255	81
Seat change	▲12	▲20	▼78
Popular vote	467,407	438,494	164,637
Percentage	26.92%	25.26%	9.48%
Swing	▲1.72%	▲1.34%	▼5.68%
	Fourth party	Fifth party	Sixth party
Leader	Brendan Howlin	Eamon Ryan	Catherine Murphy; Róisín Shortall
Party	Labour	Green	Social Democrats
Leader since	20 May 2016	27 May 2011	15 July 2015
Last election	51	12	New party
Seats won	57	49	19
Seat change	▲6	▲37	New party
Popular vote	99,500	96,315	39,644
Percentage	5.73%	5.55%	2.28%
Swing	▼1.41%	▲3.95%	New party
	Seventh party	Eighth party	Ninth party
	S-PBP		I4C
Leader	Collective leadership	Peadar Tóibín	None
Party	Solidarity–PBP	Aontú	Inds. 4 Change
Leader since	n/a	28 January 2019	n/a
Last election	28 (Note: Contested the 2014 election as two separate parties: Anti-Austerity Alliance and People Before Profit. Each won 14 seats.)	New party	0
Seats won	11 (Sol 4) (PBP 7)	3	3
Seat change	▼17	New party	▲3
Popular vote	32,883 (Sol 10,911) (PBP 21,972)	25,660	8,626
Percentage	1.89% (Sol 0.64%) (PBP 1.29%)	1.48%	0.5%
Swing	▼1.11% (Sol ▼0.60%) (PBP ▼0.41%)	New party	▲0.39%

The 2019 Irish local elections were held in all local authorities in Ireland on Friday, 24 May 2019, on the same day as the 2019 European Parliament election and a referendum easing restrictions on divorce. Each local government area is divided into local electoral areas (LEAs) where three to seven councillors are elected on the electoral system of proportional representation by means of the single transferable vote.

== Administrative boundary changes ==
There was one change to the local government areas since the 2014 elections, with a transfer of land from County Cork to Cork city under the Local Government Act 2019.

Reviews of the county boundaries near Drogheda, Athlone, and Carlow (Graiguecullen) recommended no change. A review recommending transfer of Ferrybank from Kilkenny County Council to Waterford City and County Council was rejected by minister Simon Coveney after objections from Kilkenny.

Two Local Electoral Area Boundary Committees were established in 2017 under the Local Government Reform Act 2014 and reported on 13 June 2018. The government accepted all recommendations and the boundaries of municipal districts and LEAs were consequently revised by statutory instruments signed on 19 December 2018 by John Paul Phelan, Minister of State at the Department of Housing, Planning and Local Government. In 2014, most districts had a single LEA and all LEAs (except for Cork city) had between 6 and 10 councillors, whereas from 2019 LEAs had between 3 and 7 councillors and some large municipal districts on the west coast had two LEAs to account for the greater distances involved for elected representatives.

Under the 2014 Act, the municipal districts containing the area of the former borough councils of Clonmel, Drogheda, Sligo and Wexford are designated as borough districts. The Boundary Committee proposed also designating census towns over 30,000 as borough districts, which would include the towns of Bray, Navan and Dundalk. A change to this designation was made by statutory instrument but was later reversed as incompatible with the 2014 Act.

== Mayoral plebiscites ==
Plebiscites took place in Cork City Council, Limerick City and County Council and Waterford City and County Council on whether to create the office of directly elected mayors with executive functions who will act as an ex officio member and chair of the council. These plebiscites were held under Part 6 of the Local Government Act 2019. The proposal was approved in Limerick City and County and rejected in both Cork City and Waterford City and County.

== Election timetable ==
The elections were held in accordance with the Local Elections Regulations 1995 as amended. Relevant dates are as follows:

- 25 March: Ministerial order fixing the election date was made by Eoghan Murphy, the Minister for Housing, Planning and Local Government.
- 30 March: Election spending audit period begins.
- 24 April: Posters may be put up in public.
- 27 April: Opening (10am) of period of formal nomination of candidates to returning officer of each local authority. Political parties will in general have selected candidates for nomination in advance of this date.
- 28 April: Last date for addition to the postal and special voters lists.
- 4 May: Nominations close (midday).
- 7 May: Last date for addition to the supplementary electoral register.
- 23 May: Polling day on offshore islands. Broadcasting Authority of Ireland moratorium on campaign coverage starts at 2pm.
- 24 May: Polling day (7 a.m. – 10 p.m.). Election spending audit period ends.
- 25 May: Counting of votes begins.
- 31 May: Newly elected councillors take office. Posters must be removed by this date to avoid constituting an offence of littering.
- 7 June: First meeting of the new councils.

== Campaign ==
Fine Gael head office issued a pre-election circular to its candidates on strategy for negotiating post-election power-sharing deals with other parties or groups. It prohibits deals with Sinn Féin, except where a council shares power across all groups (typically via D'Hondt method allocation of posts).

Garda inquiries were launched in relation to an unusually large number of postal vote applications in the Ballymote–Tubbercurry LEA, and alleged irregularities around 200 names added to the supplementary electoral register in the Killarney LEA.

Ellie Kisyombe, a Malawi-born refugee running for the Social Democrats in Dublin's North Inner City LEA, was retained after a review of inconsistencies in her account of her asylum history and time in direct provision, which caused several party members to resign in protest. The principal of Cadamstown national school in County Kildare was criticised for a letter to parents praising Fianna Fáil councillors over those of Fine Gael in dealing with the school.

Taoiseach Leo Varadkar stated after the poll that news of a personal injury claim taken by Fine Gael TD Maria Bailey in the week preceding the elections had caused reputational damage to Fine Gael.

== Opinion polls ==
Last date of polling	Polling firm / Commissioner	Sample size	FG	FF	SF	Lab	S–PBP	SD	GP	RI	Aon	IA	O/I
17 April 2019	Red C/The Sunday Business Post	1,000	27	20	15	5	<1	1	5	<1	<1	4	23 (Note: A figure for 'Others/Independents' is not mentioned in the cited source, but has been calculated by subtracting the other parties from 100%, so the figure shown may be slightly inaccurate due to rounding effects.)

== Results by party ==
Republican Sinn Féin and Independent Left are not registered parties; therefore their candidates appear on the ballot as Non-Party.

People Before Profit and Solidarity candidates ran under the electoral alliance Solidarity–People Before Profit.

Party	Seats	±	1st pref	FPv%	±%
Fianna Fáil	279	▲12	467,736	26.92	▲1.72
Fine Gael	255	▲20	439,317	25.29	▲1.34
Sinn Féin	81	▼78	164,307	9.46	▼5.68
Labour	57	▲6	99,502	5.73	▼1.41
Green	49	▲37	96,313	5.54	▲3.95
Social Democrats	19	New	39,642	2.28	New
People Before Profit	7	▼7	21,972	1.29	▼0.41
Solidarity	4	▼10	10,911	0.64	▼0.60
Aontú	3	New	25,662	1.48	New
Inds. 4 Change	3	▲3	9,055	0.52	▲0.39
Renua	1	New	10,115	0.58	New
Workers and Unemployed	1	Steady	2,621	0.15	▲0.04
Workers' Party	1	Steady	2,620	0.15	▼0.03
Kerry Ind. Alliance	1	Steady	1,983	0.11	▼0.01
Independent Left	1	New	1,808	0.10	New
Irish Democratic	1	New	1,054	0.06	New
Republican Sinn Féin	1	Steady	971	0.06	▼0.03
Éirígí	0	Steady	1,547	0.09	▼0.09
HRRA	0	Steady	1,462	0.08	▲0.08
Direct Democracy	0	Steady	585	0.03	▼0.18
United People	0	Steady	134	0.01	▲0.01
Independent	185	▼7	338,091	19.56	▼3.24
Totals	949	—	1,737,408	100.00	—
Electorate: 3,535,450 Total votes: 1,772,026 Spoilt votes: 34,618 (1.95%) Turnout: 50.12%
Source: Department of Housing, Planning and Local Government

== Results by council ==
Authority	FF	FG	SF	Lab	GP	SD	PBP	Sol	I4C	Aon	Ren	WUA	WP	RSF	KIA	IDP	Ind	Total	Details
Carlow	6	6	1	2			1										2	18	Details
Cavan	8	7	1							1							1	18	Details
Clare	13	8	1		1												5	28	Details
Cork	18	20	2	2	2	1											10	55	Details
Cork City	8	7	4	1	4			1					1				5	31	Details
Donegal	12	6	10	1													8	37	Details
Dublin City	11	9	8	8	10	5	2		1								9	63	Details
Dún Laoghaire–Rathdown	7	13		6	6	1	2										5	40	Details
Fingal	8	7	4	6	5	2		1	1								6	40	Details
Galway	15	11	1		1									1 (Note: Republican Sinn Féin is an unregistered party; therefore Curraoin appears on official lists as non-Party.)			10	39	Details
Galway City	5	3		1	2	1											6	18	Details
Kerry	10	7	4	2											1		9	33	Details
Kildare	12	11	1	5	3	4											4	40	Details
Kilkenny	11	9		2	1												1	24	Details
Laois	6	7	2	1													3	19	Details
Leitrim	6	6	2														4	18	Details
Limerick	12	14	2	3	2	1											6	40	Details
Longford	6	9															3	18	Details
Louth	7	5	7	3	1												6	29	Details
Mayo	11	12	1														6	30	Details
Meath	12	12	3	1		1				1							10	40	Details
Monaghan	4	5	6														3	18	Details
Offaly	8	4			1	1					1					1	3	19	Details
Roscommon	6	2	1														9	18	Details
Sligo	5	6	2				1		1								3	18	Details
South Dublin	8	7	6	2	4	1	1	2									9	40	Details
Tipperary	9	12	2	1								1					15	40	Details
Waterford	7	7	6	4	2												6	32	Details
Westmeath	9	5		2	2												2	20	Details
Wexford	12	9	2	2						1							8	34	Details
Wicklow	7	9	2	2	2	1											9	32	Details
Total	279	255	81	57	49	19	7	4	3	3	1	1	1	1	1	1	186	949	

== Non-Irish candidates ==
All foreigners residing in Ireland can run and vote in local elections, irrespective of their residence status. This also includes asylum-seekers. In 2019, 31 non-Irish candidates ran in the election, originating from countries such as Nigeria, Poland, Romania, Lithuania. Four managed to win seats. Members of the largest minority in Ireland, the Polish were less active as candidates than in previous elections in 2009 and 2014. While in those years, 9 Polish candidates ran each time, in 2019 the number was only 3. None won a seat.

== See also ==
- 2019 Northern Ireland local elections
