= Rory Kiely =

Irish politician (1934–2018)

Cathaoirleach of Seanad Éireann
- In office 12 September 2002 – 13 September 2007
- Preceded by: Brian Mullooly
- Succeeded by: Pat Moylan

Senator
- In office 23 February 1983 – 13 September 2007
- In office 27 October 1977 – 13 May 1982
- Constituency: Agricultural Panel

Personal details
- Born: 1 May 1934 Kilmallock, County Limerick, Ireland
- Died: 13 June 2018 (aged 84) County Limerick, Ireland
- Party: Fianna Fáil
- Spouse: Eileen O'Connor
- Children: 4
- Education: University College Cork

Rory Kiely (1 May 1934 – 13 June 2018) was an Irish Fianna Fáil politician. Kiely was an unsuccessful candidate for the Dáil at the 1969 general election for the Limerick West. Kiely was first elected in 1977, to the 14th Seanad. He was re-elected by the Agricultural Panel to every subsequent Seanad, except for the short-lived 16th Seanad in 1982, until he retired in 2007. He was the Cathaoirleach of Seanad Éireann from 2002 to 2007.

He was born in Feenagh, Kilmallock, County Limerick. A farmer, he was married to Eileen Kiely (née O'Connor) and had two sons and two daughters. He was educated at C.B.S. Charleville, County Cork and University College Cork (Diploma in Social and Rural Science).

He was a trustee of the Gaelic Athletic Association (GAA) and was a member of Munster Council GAA from 1982. He was also a former chair of Limerick GAA county board.

He died on 13 June 2018, at the age of 84.

Oireachtas
Preceded by Brian Mullooly	Cathaoirleach of Seanad Éireann; 2002–2007	Succeeded by Pat Moylan
