= 2009 Offaly County Council election =

Part of the 2009 Irish local elections

← 2004	5 June 2009	2014 →

All 21 seats on Offaly County Council
	First party	Second party	Third party
Party	Fianna Fáil	Fine Gael	Independent
Seats won	9	6	6
Seat change	+1	-	+1
	Fourth party
Party	Progressive Democrats
Seats won	0
Seat change	-2
- Map showing the area of Offaly County Council
Council control after election
TBD

An election to Offaly County Council took place on 5 June 2009 as part of that year's Irish local elections. 21 councillors were elected from four local electoral areas (LEAs) for a five-year term of office on the electoral system of proportional representation by means of the single transferable vote (PR-STV).

== Results by party ==
Party	Seats	±	First Pref. votes	FPv%	±%
Fianna Fáil	9	+1			
Fine Gael	6	-			
Independent	6	+1			
Progressive Democrats	0	-2			
Totals	21	-		100.0	—

== Results by local electoral area ==
=== Birr ===
Birr - 4 seats
Party	Candidate	FPv%	Count							
Party	Candidate	FPv%	1	2	3	4	5	6	7	8
Fianna Fáil	Peter Ormond*	20.61	1,481							
Independent	Tony McLoughlin*	14.61	1,050	1,053	1,056	1,093	1,146	1,348	1,670	
Independent	John Carroll*	14.41	1,036	1,043	1,046	1,099	1,134	1,254	1,415	1,514
Fine Gael	Percy Clendennen*	13.27	954	956	959	1,031	1,157	1,200	1,276	1,322
Fianna Fáil	Denis Tierney	8.99	646	648	668	686	714			
Independent	Denis Sheils	8.86	637	640	642	681	715	826		
Fine Gael	Brian Whelahan	8.74	628	628	632	704	801	897	1,050	1,122
Fine Gael	Nigel Craughwell	5.32	382	382	383	403				
Independent	Philip Ryan	4.91	353	354	361					
Christian Solidarity	Colm Callanan	0.28	20							
Electorate: 10,677 Valid: 7,187 (67.31%) Spoilt: 108 Quota: 1,438 Turnout: 7,295 (68.32%)

=== Edenderry ===
Edenderry – 6 seats
Party	Candidate	FPv%	Count													
Party	Candidate	FPv%	1	2	3	4	5	6	7	8	9	10	11	12	13	14
Fianna Fáil	John Foley*	17.25	1,649													
Independent	Eddie Fitzpatrick*	12.93	1,236	1,245	1,248	1,295	1,340	1,353	1,366	1,481						
Fianna Fáil	Noel Bourke*	12.60	1,205	1,324	1,344	1,367										
Fine Gael	Liam Quinn	7.55	722	736	766	769	776	839	846	857	859	908	948	981	1,088	1,272
Labour	Declan Leddin	6.20	593	609	610	610	614	620	681	688	690	735	750	833	867	918
Fianna Fáil	Ger Plunkett	6.15	588	605	608	654	671	694	700	727	739	778	797	815	831	962
Fine Gael	Nichola Hogan	6.09	582	603	608	609	615	638	706	713	717	740	818	931	1,148	1,278
Independent	Michael Fox*	4.67	447	455	464	465	478	525	537	557	577	632	667	734	804	
Independent	Fergus McDonnell*	3.59	343	363	370	370	378	398	455	478	483	513	521			
Fine Gael	John Foran*	3.47	332	342	346	349	360	364	387	413	425	433	528	580		
Fine Gael	Jack Deegan	3.36	321	322	323	333	349	351	360	378	392	413				
Sinn Féin	Martin O'Reilly	3.22	308	313	320	327	337	348	358	379	381					
Independent	Stephen Mather	2.92	279	284	284	288	309	315	320							
Independent	Noel Cribbin	2.81	269	285	292	292	296	306								
Independent	Fidelma Doolan	2.46	235	246	263	264	269									
Independent	Frank Weir	1.87	179	181	183	193										
Fianna Fáil	Tom Nolan	1.56	149	158	159											
Independent	Dominic Sheehy	1.17	112	113												
Christian Solidarity	Colm Callanan	0.14	13	13												
Electorate: 15,602 Valid: 9,562 (61.29%) Spoilt: 120 Quota: 1,367 Turnout: 9,682 (62.06%)

=== Ferbane ===
Ferbane - 4 seats
Party	Candidate	FPv%	Count					
Party	Candidate	FPv%	1	2	3	4	5	6
Fianna Fáil	Eamon Dooley*	15.97	1,257	1,268	1,335	1,351	1,669	
Independent	John Leahy	14.54	1,144	1,297	1,403	1,546	1,798	
Fine Gael	Connie Hanniffy*	14.26	1,122	1,163	1,280	1,450	1,505	1,525
Fianna Fáil	Sinead Moylan-Ryan*	13.70	1,078	1,088	1,117	1,242	1,432	1,522
Fine Gael	Marcella Corcoran Kennedy*	11.48	903	954	1,015	1,246	1,280	1,320
Fianna Fáil	Tom Feighery*	10.79	849	874	895	907		
Fine Gael	Tom Rigney	9.20	723	735	748			
Independent	Ollie Daly	5.49	432	460				
Labour	Mary Kiely	4.19	330					
Christian Solidarity	Colm Callanan	0.38	30					
Electorate: 11,766 Valid: 7,869 (66.88%) Spoilt: 129 Quota: 1,574 Turnout: 7,998 (67.98%)

=== Tullamore ===
Tullamore – 7 seats
Party	Candidate	FPv%	Count										
Party	Candidate	FPv%	1	2	3	4	5	6	7	8	9	10	11
Fianna Fáil	Barry Cowen*	13.26	1,626										
Fine Gael	Tommy McKeigue*	13.01	1,496										
Fianna Fáil	Sinead Dooley	10.52	1,234	1,290	1,304	1,307	1,338	1,378	1,510				
Fine Gael	Molly Buckley*	9.96	1,168	1,173	1,234	1,245	1,288	1,489					
Independent	Dervill Dolan*	9.95	1,167	1,201	1,208	1,210	1,267	1,368	1,420	1,425	1,927		
Fianna Fáil	Danny Owens*	8.83	1,036	1,061	1,078	1,080	1,082	1,092	1,137	1,148	1,204	1,275	1,280
Sinn Féin	Brendan Killeavey	6.72	788	791	796	797	830	853	1,007	1,020	1,073	1,113	1,117
Independent	Johnny Butterfield*	6.59	773	777	801	804	850	886	999	1,010	1,072	1,128	1,141
Independent	Frank Moran	5.99	702	719	721	721	778	917	948	951			
Labour	Seán O'Brien	5.57	653	656	668	671	688	724					
Fine Gael	Frank Feery	4.76	558	565	608	611	633						
Independent	John Bracken	2.84	333	337	340	341							
Fine Gael	Vinny O'Brien	1.58	185	186									
Christian Solidarity	Colm Callanan	0.09	10	10									
Electorate: 18,568 Valid: 11,729 (63.17%) Spoilt: 145 Quota: 1,467 Turnout: 11,874 (63.95%)
