= 2004 Offaly County Council election =

Part of the 2004 Irish local elections

← 1999	11 June 2004	2009 →

All 21 seats on Offaly County Council
	First party	Second party	Third party
Party	Fianna Fáil	Fine Gael	Progressive Democrats
Seats won	8	6	2
Seat change	-1	-1	+2
	Fourth party	Fifth party
Party	Independent	Labour
Seats won	5	0
Seat change	+1	-1
- Map showing the area of Offaly County Council
Council control after election
TBD

An election to Offaly County Council took place on 11 June 2004 as part of that year's Irish local elections. 21 councillors were elected from four local electoral areas (LEAs) for a five-year term of office on the electoral system of proportional representation by means of the single transferable vote (PR-STV).

== Results by party ==
Party	Seats	±	First Pref. votes	FPv%	±%
Fianna Fáil	8	-1	10,884	33.78	
Fine Gael	6	-1	9,443	29.31	
Progressive Democrats	2	+2	2,331	7.23	
Independent	5	+1	7,655	23.76	
Labour	0	-1	1,251	3.88	
Totals	21	-	32,222	100.00	—

== Results by local electoral area ==
=== Birr ===
Birr - 5 seats
Party	Candidate	FPv%	Count						
Party	Candidate	FPv%	1	2	3	4	5	6	7
Fianna Fáil	Peter Ormond*	13.82	1,067	1,116	1,218	1,271	1,294		
Fine Gael	Percy Clendennen*	12.10	934	1,001	1,142	1,244	1,376		
Independent	John Carroll	12.09	933	979	1,004	1,074	1,156	1,332	
Independent	Tony McLoughlin	11.18	863	898	919	982	1,148	1,270	1,289
Fine Gael	Tom Rigney*	10.53	813	818	863	886	986	1,039	1,104
Fianna Fáil	Sinead Moylan-Ryan*	10.48	809	859	860	904	922	1,175	1,180
Fianna Fáil	William Loughlane	7.72	596	652	669	750	760		
Fine Gael	Denis Sheils	6.21	479	491	530	558			
Fine Gael	Billy Feighery	5.67	438	456	489				
Progressive Democrats	Liam Egan	5.61	433	438					
Fianna Fáil	Jimmy O'Brien	4.59	354						
Electorate: 11,941 Valid: 7,719 (64.64%) Spoilt: 126 Quota: 1,287 Turnout: 7,845 (65.70%)

=== Edenderry ===
Edenderry - 5 seats
Party	Candidate	FPv%	Count							
Party	Candidate	FPv%	1	2	3	4	5	6	7	8
Fianna Fáil	Noel Bourke*	25.65	1,819							
Fianna Fáil	Ger Killally*	17.44	1,237							
Fine Gael	Geraldine McGarrigle	8.72	618	644	650	657	699	782	885	925
Fine Gael	John Foran*	7.47	530	610	620	624	695	823	993	1,038
Progressive Democrats	Eddie Fitzpatrick	7.09	503	520	616	617	692	878	901	1,092
Fine Gael	Liam Hogan	6.91	490	595	597	604	613	641		
Progressive Democrats	Fergus McDonnell	6.28	445	624	650	657	692	706	893	947
Fine Gael	Jack Deegan	6.91	440	450	514	515	600			
Independent	Frank Weir*	6.09	432	463	502	506				
Fianna Fáil	Tom Nolan*	4.37	310	491	509	533	619	672	694	
Progressive Democrats	Sam Gee	3.77	267	275						
Electorate: 12,817 Valid: 7,091 (55.32%) Spoilt: 174 Quota: 1,182 Turnout: 7,265 (56.68%)

=== Ferbane ===
Ferbane - 4 seats
Party	Candidate	FPv%	Count					
Party	Candidate	FPv%	1	2	3	4	5	6
Fine Gael	Connie Hanniffy*	20.75	1,218					
Fine Gael	Marcella Corcoran Kennedy*	16.14	947	971	997	1,057	1,195	
Fianna Fáil	Eamon Dooley*	15.49	909	914	921	964	995	1,037
Fianna Fáil	Tom Feighery*	14.82	870	872	880	903	998	1,209
Labour	Timmy Molloy	9.10	534	535	565	592	640	
Independent	Ollie Daly	9.06	532	538	549	685	735	871
Progressive Democrats	Seán O'Brien	6.47	380	382	402	420		
Independent	John Bracken	5.90	346	363				
Independent	Christopher Gannon	1.33	78	78				
Green	Stephen Hollinshead	0.94	55	56				
Electorate: 9,449 Valid: 5,869 (62.11%) Spoilt: 99 Quota: 1,174 Turnout: 5,968 (63.16%)

=== Tullamore ===
Tullamore - 7 seats
Party	Candidate	FPv%	Count												
Party	Candidate	FPv%	1	2	3	4	5	6	7	8	9	10	11	12	13
Fine Gael	Tommy McKeigue*	13.01	1,502												
Independent	Dervill Dolan*	12.99	1,500												
Independent	Molly Buckley*	11.38	1,314	1,324	1,327	1,342	1,352	1,380	1,452						
Fianna Fáil	Barry Cowen*	10.13	1,169	1,172	1,188	1,225	1,245	1,249	1,259	1,275	1,304	1,321	1,485		
Independent	Johnny Butterfield	8.76	1,011	1,017	1,019	1,027	1,034	1,054	1,078	1,090	1,134	1,182	1,209	1,286	1,371
Fine Gael	Michael Fox*	6.14	709	722	723	758	759	826	841	850	939	961	1,007	1,090	1,134
Fianna Fáil	Danny Owens	6.07	701	703	704	704	704	706	709	712	752	772	826	1,031	1,087
Independent	Frank Moran	5.60	646	647	669	693	723	724	729	761	767	796	807	821	
Fianna Fáil	Paddy Rowland	5.15	594	597	598	602	602	616	620	624	637	653	719		
Labour	Seán O'Brien*	4.58	529	535	536	537	542	554	570	664	688	726	781	889	948
Fianna Fáil	Brian Digan	3.89	449	452	453	454	455	460	464	472	482	503			
Progressive Democrats	Breda Treacy	2.62	303	305	306	308	310	313	330	331					
Sinn Féin	Seamus Walsh	2.06	238	239	239	239	322	324	336	346	361				
Green	Alison Badrian	1.69	195	196	196	197	197	205							
Labour	Peter Greville	1.63	188	189	191	193	199	207	214						
Sinn Féin	Oliver O'Connor	1.47	170	170	173	176									
Fine Gael	Kevin Doheny	1.46	168	173	173	185	185								
Fine Gael	Noel Reynolds	1.36	157	159	162										
Electorate: 19,001 Valid: 11,543 (60.75%) Spoilt: 201 Quota: 1,443 Turnout: 11,744 (61.81%)
