= Tom Enright =

Irish politician (born 1940)

Teachta Dála
- In office June 1997 – May 2002
- In office June 1969 – November 1992
- Constituency: Laois–Offaly

Senator
- In office 17 February 1993 – 6 June 1997
- Constituency: Administrative Panel

Offaly County Councillor
- In office June 1967 – June 1999
- Constituency: Birr

Personal details
- Born: 26 July 1940 (age 86) Shinrone, County Offaly, Ireland
- Party: Fine Gael
- Children: 5, including Olwyn
- Relatives: Joe McHugh (son-in-law)
- Education: University College Dublin

Thomas W. Enright (born 26 July 1940) is an Irish former Fine Gael politician who served as a Teachta Dála (TD) for the Laois–Offaly constituency from 1969 to 1992 and 1997 to 2002. He also served as a Senator for the Administrative Panel from 1992 to 1997.

== Early life and education ==
Enright was born in Shinrone, County Offaly, in 1940. He was educated at the Cistercian College, Roscrea, University College Dublin and the Incorporated Law Society of Ireland.

== Political career ==
He practised as a solicitor before becoming involved in politics in 1967 as a member of Offaly County Council for the Birr local electoral area. Enright was first elected to Dáil Éireann as a Fine Gael TD for the Laois–Offaly constituency at the 1969 general election. He was subsequently appointed Fine Gael spokesperson on Tourism (1977–1979) and Consumer Affairs (1979–1981).

Enright lost his Dáil seat at the 1992 general election to Pat Gallagher as part of the swing to the Labour Party in that election. He was then elected to the 20th Seanad, where he served from 1993 to 1997. He regained his Dáil seat at the 1997 general election and retired at the 2002 general election. He was succeeded by his daughter Olwyn Enright.

== See also ==
- Families in the Oireachtas

Party political offices
Preceded by Donal Creed	Chair of the Fine Gael parliamentary party 1989–1993	Succeeded by Michael Lowry

Dáil	Election	Deputy (Party)	Deputy (Party)	Deputy (Party)	Deputy (Party)	Deputy (Party)
2nd	1921	Joseph Lynch (SF)	Patrick McCartan (SF)	Francis Bulfin (SF)	Kevin O'Higgins (SF)	4 seats 1921–1923
3rd	1922	William Davin (Lab)	Patrick McCartan (PT-SF)	Francis Bulfin (PT-SF)	Kevin O'Higgins (PT-SF)	4 seats 1921–1923
4th	1923	William Davin (Lab)	Laurence Brady (Rep)	Francis Bulfin (CnaG)	Patrick Egan (CnaG)	Seán McGuinness (Rep)
4th	1926 by-election	William Davin (Lab)	Laurence Brady (Rep)	Francis Bulfin (CnaG)	Patrick Egan (CnaG)	James Dwyer (CnaG)
5th	1927 (Jun)	William Davin (Lab)	Patrick Boland (FF)	Thomas Tynan (FF)	John Gill (Lab)	James Dwyer (CnaG)
6th	1927 (Sep)	William Davin (Lab)	Patrick Boland (FF)	Patrick Gorry (FF)	William Aird (CnaG)	James Dwyer (CnaG)
7th	1932	William Davin (Lab)	Patrick Boland (FF)	Patrick Gorry (FF)	Thomas F. O'Higgins (CnaG)	Eugene O'Brien (CnaG)
8th	1933	William Davin (Lab)	Patrick Boland (FF)	Eamon Donnelly (FF)	Thomas F. O'Higgins (CnaG)	Jack Finlay (NCP)
9th	1937	William Davin (Lab)	Patrick Boland (FF)	Patrick Gorry (FF)	Thomas F. O'Higgins (FG)	Jack Finlay (FG)
10th	1938	William Davin (Lab)	Patrick Boland (FF)	Patrick Gorry (FF)	Thomas F. O'Higgins (FG)	Daniel Hogan (FF)
11th	1943	William Davin (Lab)	Patrick Boland (FF)	Patrick Gorry (FF)	Thomas F. O'Higgins (FG)	Oliver J. Flanagan (IMR)
12th	1944	William Davin (Lab)	Patrick Boland (FF)	Patrick Gorry (FF)	Thomas F. O'Higgins (FG)	Oliver J. Flanagan (IMR)
13th	1948	William Davin (Lab)	Patrick Boland (FF)	Patrick Gorry (FF)	Tom O'Higgins, Jnr (FG)	Oliver J. Flanagan (Ind.)
14th	1951	William Davin (Lab)	Patrick Boland (FF)	Peadar Maher (FF)	Tom O'Higgins, Jnr (FG)	Oliver J. Flanagan (Ind.)
15th	1954	William Davin (Lab)	Nicholas Egan (FF)	Peadar Maher (FF)	Tom O'Higgins, Jnr (FG)	Oliver J. Flanagan (FG)
15th	1956 by-election	Kieran Egan (FF)	Nicholas Egan (FF)	Peadar Maher (FF)	Tom O'Higgins, Jnr (FG)	Oliver J. Flanagan (FG)
16th	1957	Kieran Egan (FF)	Nicholas Egan (FF)	Peadar Maher (FF)	Tom O'Higgins, Jnr (FG)	Oliver J. Flanagan (FG)
17th	1961	Kieran Egan (FF)	Nicholas Egan (FF)	Patrick Lalor (FF)	Tom O'Higgins, Jnr (FG)	Oliver J. Flanagan (FG)
18th	1965	Henry Byrne (Lab)	Nicholas Egan (FF)	Patrick Lalor (FF)	Tom O'Higgins, Jnr (FG)	Oliver J. Flanagan (FG)
19th	1969	Ger Connolly (FF)	Bernard Cowen (FF)	Patrick Lalor (FF)	Tom Enright (FG)	Oliver J. Flanagan (FG)
20th	1973	Ger Connolly (FF)	Charles McDonald (FG)	Patrick Lalor (FF)	Tom Enright (FG)	Oliver J. Flanagan (FG)
21st	1977	Ger Connolly (FF)	Bernard Cowen (FF)	Patrick Lalor (FF)	Tom Enright (FG)	Oliver J. Flanagan (FG)
22nd	1981	Ger Connolly (FF)	Bernard Cowen (FF)	Liam Hyland (FF)	Tom Enright (FG)	Oliver J. Flanagan (FG)
23rd	1982 (Feb)	Ger Connolly (FF)	Bernard Cowen (FF)	Liam Hyland (FF)	Tom Enright (FG)	Oliver J. Flanagan (FG)
24th	1982 (Nov)	Ger Connolly (FF)	Bernard Cowen (FF)	Liam Hyland (FF)	Tom Enright (FG)	Oliver J. Flanagan (FG)
24th	1984 by-election	Ger Connolly (FF)	Brian Cowen (FF)	Liam Hyland (FF)	Tom Enright (FG)	Oliver J. Flanagan (FG)
25th	1987	Ger Connolly (FF)	Brian Cowen (FF)	Liam Hyland (FF)	Tom Enright (FG)	Charles Flanagan (FG)
26th	1989	Ger Connolly (FF)	Brian Cowen (FF)	Liam Hyland (FF)	Tom Enright (FG)	Charles Flanagan (FG)
27th	1992	Ger Connolly (FF)	Brian Cowen (FF)	Liam Hyland (FF)	Pat Gallagher (Lab)	Charles Flanagan (FG)
28th	1997	John Moloney (FF)	Brian Cowen (FF)	Seán Fleming (FF)	Tom Enright (FG)	Charles Flanagan (FG)
29th	2002	John Moloney (FF)	Brian Cowen (FF)	Seán Fleming (FF)	Olwyn Enright (FG)	Tom Parlon (PDs)
30th	2007	John Moloney (FF)	Brian Cowen (FF)	Seán Fleming (FF)	Olwyn Enright (FG)	Charles Flanagan (FG)
31st	2011	Brian Stanley (SF)	Barry Cowen (FF)	Seán Fleming (FF)	Marcella Corcoran Kennedy (FG)	Charles Flanagan (FG)
32nd	2016	Constituency abolished. See Laois and Offaly.				
33rd	2020	Brian Stanley (SF)	Barry Cowen (FF)	Seán Fleming (FF)	Carol Nolan (Ind.)	Charles Flanagan (FG)
33rd	2024	Brian Stanley (SF)	(Vacant)	Seán Fleming (FF)	Carol Nolan (Ind.)	Charles Flanagan (FG)
34th	2024	Constituency abolished. See Laois and Offaly.				
