= Lucinda Creighton =

Irish businesswoman and former politician (born 1980)

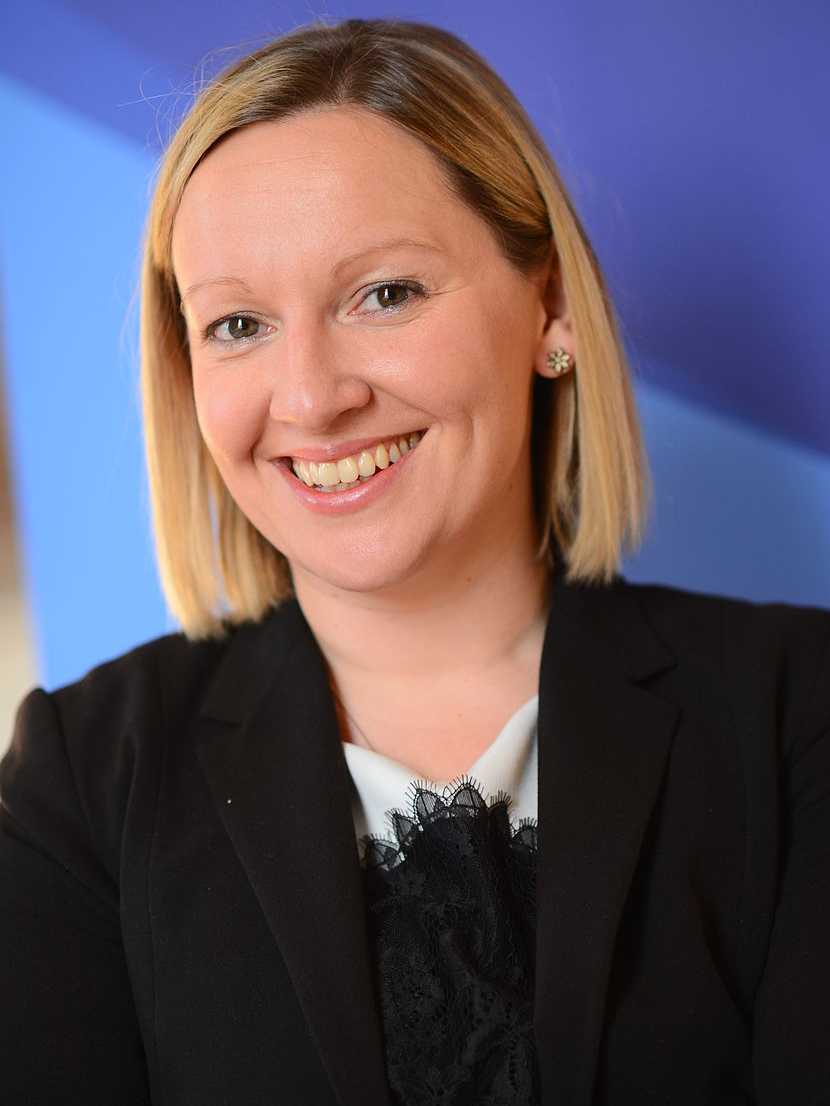
- Creighton in 2012

Leader of Renua
- In office 13 March 2015 – 14 May 2016
- Deputy: Billy Timmins
- Preceded by: New office
- Succeeded by: John Leahy

Minister of State
- 2011–2013: Taoiseach
- 2011–2013: Foreign Affairs

Teachta Dála
- In office May 2007 – February 2016
- Constituency: Dublin South-East

Personal details
- Born: 20 January 1980 (age 46) Claremorris, County Mayo, Ireland
- Party: Renua (2015–2016)
- Other political affiliations: Reform Alliance (2013–2015); Fine Gael (until 2013)
- Spouse: Paul Bradford (m. 2011)
- Children: 3
- Education: Trinity College Dublin
- Profession: Business consultancy
- Website: lucindacreighton.ie

Lucinda Creighton (born 20 January 1980) is an Irish businesswoman and former politician, who served as Minister of State for European Affairs from 2011 to 2013. She was leader of Renua from its March 2015 foundation until May 2016, and served as a Teachta Dála (TD) representing Dublin South-East from 2007 to 2016.

Elected while a member of Fine Gael, she lost the party whip when she voted against a 2013 bill introduced by the Fine Gael–Labour government to ease restrictions on abortion. Following her resignation from Fine Gael in July 2013, she sat as an Independent until the launch of Renua. She lost her seat at the 2016 general election, and resigned as Renua leader two months later.

== Early and personal life ==
Creighton grew up in Claremorris, County Mayo, where her father was a bookmaker and her mother a teacher. She is a graduate of Trinity College Dublin, where she gained a Bachelor of Laws in 2002. She was a member of the Trinity College branch of Young Fine Gael. In 2003, she qualified as an attorney-at-law for the state of New York. She was called to the Irish Bar in 2005.

In April 2011 Creighton married Paul Bradford, a fellow legislator in Seanad Éireann, who also switched from Fine Gael to Renua. They have three children; a daughter and two sons.

== Political career ==
=== Fine Gael ===
While at Trinity College, Creighton was elected Deputy Secretary General of the Youth of the European People's Party. She was elected to Dublin City Council in 2004, at the age of 24, representing the Pembroke local electoral area.

Creighton was elected to Dáil Éireann at her first attempt, at the 2007 general election, as its youngest member, the first TD born in the 1980s. She was appointed Fine Gael Spokesperson on European Affairs in 2007, remaining in post until 2010. During that period she was critical of party leader Enda Kenny. In July 2010, she criticised what she termed the "cute hoor politics" in Fine Gael. That October she was appointed as party deputy Spokesperson on Justice, with special responsibility for Immigration, Integration and Equality.

She played a key role in Fine Gael's campaign for a 'yes' vote in both referendums on the Treaty of Lisbon. Creighton was re-elected in February 2011, topping the poll in Dublin South-East.

On 10 March 2011, she was appointed by the Fine Gael–Labour government as Minister of State at the Department of the Taoiseach and at the Department of Foreign Affairs with responsibility as Minister of State for European Affairs. Upon taking office she was openly critical of the response by European leaders to the eurozone crisis, telling an audience in London in May 2011:

"European leaders have gone from contributing to the development of the Union to identifying what they can take from it and parade in front of their own electorates. While the European spirit lives on, what is absent is the willingness and courage to argue, communicate and persuade people that it is still a good idea."

During her time as Minister, Creighton visited every EU member, candidate and aspiring country at least once, and represented the government at meetings and conferences such as the Croatia Summit in July 2012, the EU–ASEAN ministerial meeting in Brunei in April 2012 and the EU–ASEM meeting in Budapest in June 2011. She was also the first Irish government Minister to officially meet a Minister from Myanmar, when she met its Minister of Foreign Affairs in April 2012.

Creighton was involved in the co-ordination of the planning and execution of Ireland's 2013 EU Presidency, chairing a government committee responsible for all policy preparations and oversight. In January 2013, she hosted a meeting of European Affairs Ministers in Dublin which focused on strengthening the democratic legitimacy of European Union states. Creighton played a central role during the 2012 referendum on the Stability Treaty, speaking at numerous public meetings and events. Along with Simon Coveney, she devised Fine Gael's campaign for a 'yes' vote.

Creighton was expelled from the Fine Gael parliamentary party on 11 July 2013, when she defied the party whip by voting against the Protection of Life During Pregnancy Bill 2013, which allowed a termination of pregnancy by doctors in the case of a threat to a woman's life, including a risk of suicide. She also resigned as a Minister of State.

=== Renua ===
On 13 September 2013, she and six other expellees formed the Reform Alliance, described as a "loose alliance" rather than a political party. The expulsion was criticised as indicative of the suppressing of independent voices by the party whip system and, as such, the need for having an independent Seanad. Creighton joined the Dáil Technical Group in September 2014.

On 2 January 2015, Creighton announced that she would found a new political party that spring. The party was to be founded under four principles, including, she claimed, "building an economy for entrepreneurs" and "giving politics back to the people." Creighton said: "We want to reboot Ireland and we want those who are as passionate about this country as we are to join us on this mission". She hoped her new party would raise €1 million in small donations before the next general election.

Renua was launched on 13 March 2015, with Creighton as its leader. The party contested the February 2016 general election, but lost all three of its seats. Creighton resigned as party leader on 14 May 2016.

== Political positions ==
=== Foreign policy ===
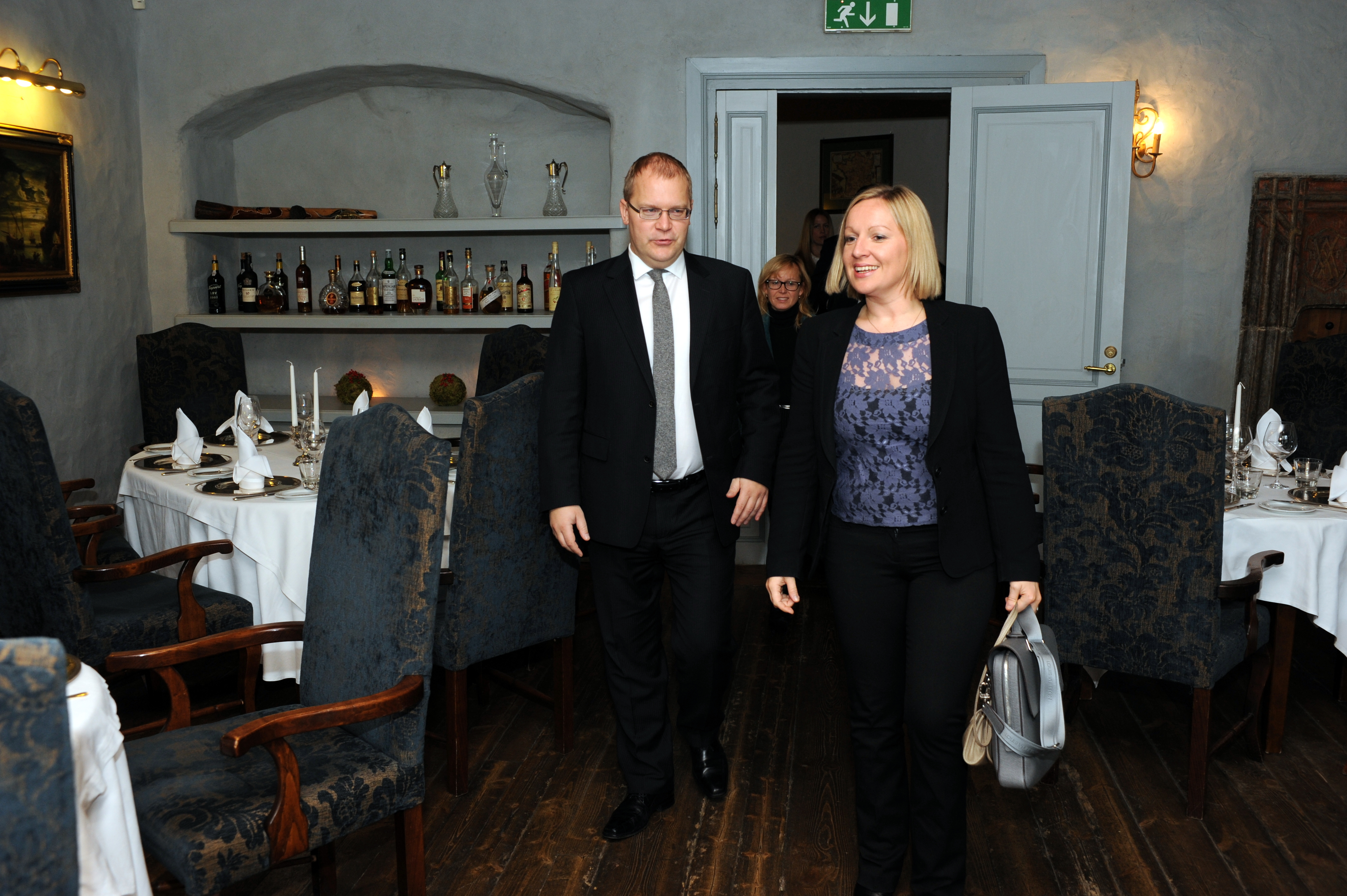
Creighton meeting with the Minister of Foreign Affairs of Estonia, Urmas Paet, in October 2012

Creighton is an opponent of Ireland's "triple-lock" system that means the deployment of the Irish Defence Forces outside of the State must first be prompted by a formal Government decision, then approved by the Dáil before being mandated by the United Nations. She favours a system in which only a Government and Dáil vote is necessary for military deployment outside the State, for she believes it is not a "viable position in Irish foreign policy that peacekeeping missions are dependent on a UN mandate when Russia and China get a veto".

=== Economic policy ===
Creighton was an early advocate of eurobonds as a potential solution to the eurozone crisis. Following a meeting with her French counterpart in Paris in December 2012, she publicly called for the European Central Bank to become a lender of last resort.

She has said Sinn Féin's economic policies are "absolutely hare-brained" and "would come close to bankrupting the country".

=== Social policy ===
Creighton stated in February 2011 that while she supported civil partnerships, which were then in the process of coming into effect, she opposed same-sex marriage and believed that "marriage is primarily about children, main purpose being to propagate and create". Controversy surrounding the comment, and its resulting backlash made national papers, and led to official statements being issued by Fine Gael distancing the party from her comments. She later changed her view to support same-sex marriage.

Creighton is against abortion, and believes "We celebrate the right of human beings to enjoy life – whether we speak of a criminal on death row, or an innocent baby girl, or a baby with Down syndrome. None of us are perfect, but our life is worthy and we are all worthy of life. Who are any one of us to determine that even one single life is not worth living, not worth protecting?"

== After politics ==
Creighton and her husband co-founded Vulcan Consulting in 2015, serving respectively as CEO and chairperson. From September 2016 she divided her time between Vulcan and Fipra Consulting in Brussels, where she headed its Brexit unit.

In September 2018, Creighton was appointed to the board of Horse Sport Ireland. Since 2019, she has a weekly column in the Business Post newspaper.

== Election results ==
Elections to the Dáil
| Party | Election | | FPv | FPv% | Result |
|---|---|---|---|---|---|
| Fine Gael | Dublin South-East | 2007 | 6,311 | 18.6 | Elected on count 5/5 |
| Fine Gael | Dublin South-East | 2011 | 6,619 | 19.0 | Elected on count 6/10 |
| Renua | Dublin Bay South | 2016 | 4,229 | 10.7 | Eliminated on count 5/8 |

Political offices
| Preceded by Dick Roche | Minister of State for European Affairs; 2011–2013 | Succeeded by Paschal Donohoe |
Honorary titles
| Preceded by Damien English | Baby of the Dáil; 2007–2011 | Succeeded by Simon Harris |
Party political offices
| New title | Leader of Renua; 2015–2016 | Succeeded by John Leahy |

| Dáil | Election | Deputy (Party) | Deputy (Party) | Deputy (Party) | Deputy (Party) |
|---|---|---|---|---|---|
| 13th | 1948 | John A. Costello (FG) | Seán MacEntee (FF) | Noël Browne (CnaP) | 3 seats 1948–1981 |
| 14th | 1951 | John A. Costello (FG) | Seán MacEntee (FF) | Noël Browne (Ind.) | 3 seats 1948–1981 |
| 15th | 1954 | John A. Costello (FG) | Seán MacEntee (FF) | John O'Donovan (FG) | 3 seats 1948–1981 |
| 16th | 1957 | John A. Costello (FG) | Seán MacEntee (FF) | Noël Browne (Ind.) | 3 seats 1948–1981 |
| 17th | 1961 | John A. Costello (FG) | Seán MacEntee (FF) | Noël Browne (NPD) | 3 seats 1948–1981 |
| 18th | 1965 | John A. Costello (FG) | Seán MacEntee (FF) | Seán Moore (FF) | 3 seats 1948–1981 |
| 19th | 1969 | Garret FitzGerald (FG) | Noël Browne (Lab) | Seán Moore (FF) | 3 seats 1948–1981 |
| 20th | 1973 | Garret FitzGerald (FG) | Fergus O'Brien (FG) | Seán Moore (FF) | 3 seats 1948–1981 |
| 21st | 1977 | Garret FitzGerald (FG) | Ruairi Quinn (Lab) | Seán Moore (FF) | 3 seats 1948–1981 |
| 22nd | 1981 | Garret FitzGerald (FG) | Gerard Brady (FF) | Seán Moore (FF) | Richie Ryan (FG) |
| 23rd | 1982 (Feb) | Garret FitzGerald (FG) | Gerard Brady (FF) | Ruairi Quinn (Lab) | Alexis FitzGerald Jnr (FG) |
| 24th | 1982 (Nov) | Garret FitzGerald (FG) | Gerard Brady (FF) | Ruairi Quinn (Lab) | Joe Doyle (FG) |
| 25th | 1987 | Garret FitzGerald (FG) | Gerard Brady (FF) | Ruairi Quinn (Lab) | Michael McDowell (PDs) |
| 26th | 1989 | Garret FitzGerald (FG) | Gerard Brady (FF) | Ruairi Quinn (Lab) | Joe Doyle (FG) |
| 27th | 1992 | Frances Fitzgerald (FG) | Eoin Ryan Jnr (FF) | Ruairi Quinn (Lab) | Michael McDowell (PDs) |
| 28th | 1997 | Frances Fitzgerald (FG) | Eoin Ryan Jnr (FF) | Ruairi Quinn (Lab) | John Gormley (GP) |
| 29th | 2002 | Michael McDowell (PDs) | Eoin Ryan Jnr (FF) | Ruairi Quinn (Lab) | John Gormley (GP) |
| 30th | 2007 | Lucinda Creighton (FG) | Chris Andrews (FF) | Ruairi Quinn (Lab) | John Gormley (GP) |
| 31st | 2011 | Lucinda Creighton (FG) | Eoghan Murphy (FG) | Ruairi Quinn (Lab) | Kevin Humphreys (Lab) |
| 32nd | 2016 | Constituency abolished. See Dublin Bay South. | | | |
