= Tony McCormack =

Irish politician

Tony McCormack TD
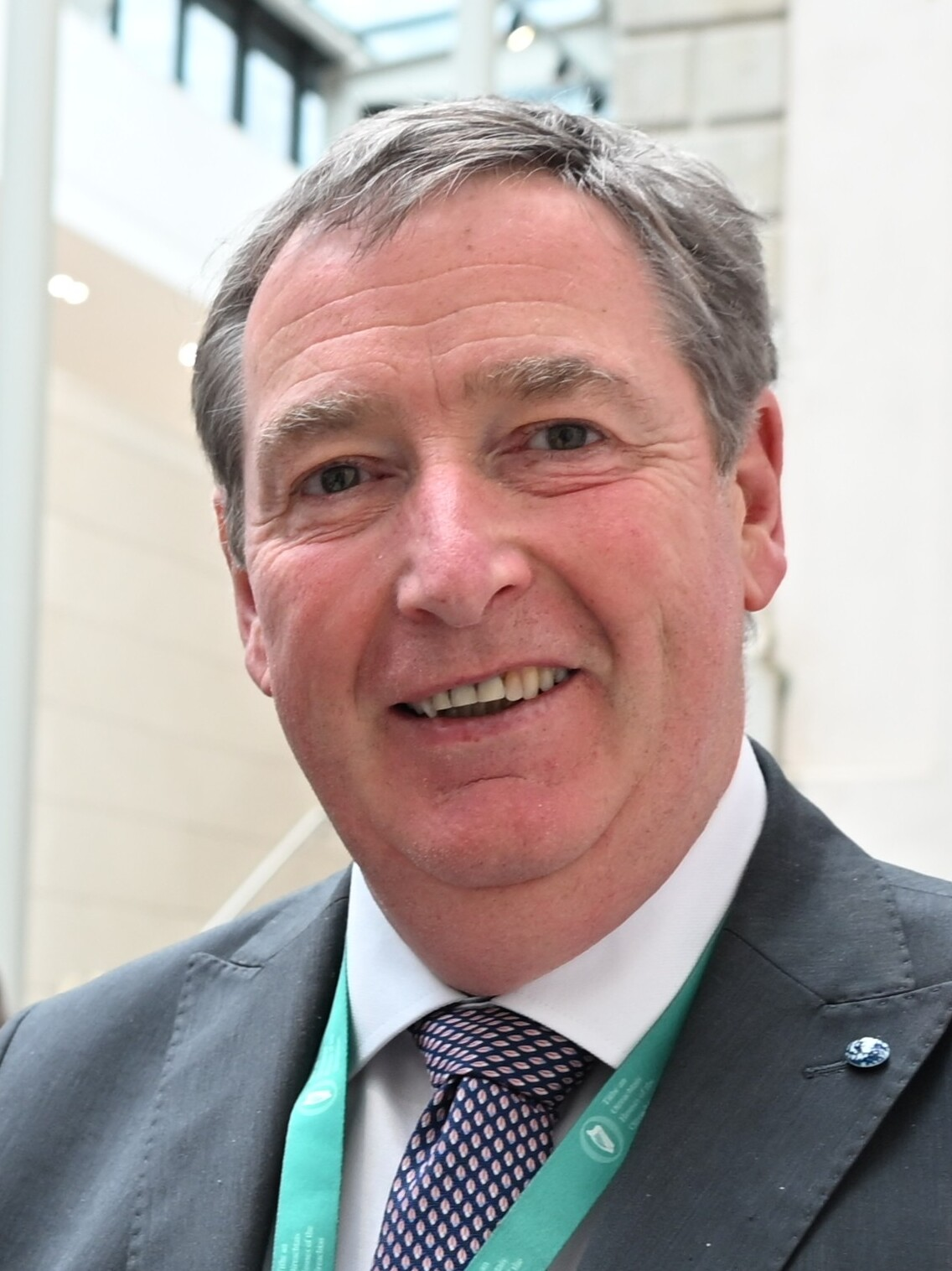
- McCormack in 2026

Teachta Dála
- Incumbent
- Assumed office November 2024
- Constituency: Offaly

Personal details
- Born: 1968/1969 (age 56–57) County Offaly, Ireland
- Party: Fianna Fáil
- Spouse: Joan McCormack
- Children: 2

Tony McCormack (born 1968/1969) is an Irish Fianna Fáil politician who has been a Teachta Dála (TD) for the Offaly constituency since the 2024 general election.

He was a member of Offaly County Council for the Tullamore local electoral area from 2017 to 2024. Formerly president of the Tullamore Chamber of Commerce, McCormack had been a member of Tullamore Town Council before its abolition in 2014, and was co-opted to the county council in 2017 to fill a casual vacancy. He retained his seat at the 2019 and 2024 elections.

He was elected Cathaoirleach of Offaly County Council after the 2024 local elections and also served on Eastern and Midland Regional Assembly.

For the past number of years he has run a printing business in the town of Tullamore.

Dáil	Election	Deputy (Party)	Deputy (Party)	Deputy (Party)
32nd	2016	Carol Nolan (SF)	Barry Cowen (FF)	Marcella Corcoran Kennedy (FG)
33rd	2020	Constituency abolished. See Laois–Offaly and Tipperary.		
34th	2024	Carol Nolan (Ind.)	Tony McCormack (FF)	John Clendennen (FG)
