= Karl Deeter =

American-Irish financial commentator

Karl Deeter is an American-Irish entrepreneur, financial commentator, media pundit and business journalist based in Ireland, who regularly appears for outlets such as Today FM and the Business Post. He is also a musician.

== Biography ==
Born 1975/1976 in Los Angeles in the United States, Deeter immigrated to Ireland aged 11 with his family. He is the son of team Crossle racing manager Ken Deeter.

Deeter attended Gormanston College as a teenager before immigrating to Chicago in his early 20s. He returned to Ireland in his mid-20s and set up the company Irish Mortgage Brokers.

=== Politics ===
In April 2013, Deeter was a guest speaker at that year's Fianna Fáil Ard Fheis.

In April 2015, the Irish Independent described him as an "espouser of old-style liberal economic laissez-faire", although Deeter acknowledged the need for the state to intervene in instances of market failure.

==== Ethics Officer of Renua ====
In the Spring of 2015, Deeter became the "Ethics Officer" of the newly created political party Renua, which had just split off from Fine Gael. Although an official with the party, Deeter stated he was not a member of the party. In June 2016 he resigned as Renua's Ethics Officer; Deeter quit after he "encountered obstacles" while investigating claims that businessman and founder of the conservative anti-EU party Libertas.eu Declan Ganley had loaned Renua money.

=== Business ===
Deeter founded a financial technology firm called OnlineApplication in 2020, in 2024 they acquired MoneyAdvice in order to offer a life broker solution to the market and the firm was sold to Software Circle, an AIM listed firm in August 2025 in a deal with a value reported as being €9 million.

=== Journalism ===
In 2018 Deeter, alongside 3 others, was nominated for a Journalism award for the "Best political story". The team had created a "political rich list" based on land registry records, public company records and political declarations to uncover and value the assets of Ireland's politicians. He is also the co-author with Charlie Weston of a book on finance called This book is worth €25,000.

Deeter was a columnist for the now defunct News of the World, and then went on to be the longest running columnist in the Sun on Sunday where his weekly installation 'Deeteronomy' focused on finance, money saving tips and politics. He stepped away from journalism in 2021 to focus on his business interests.
