= Renua =

Irish political party

Centre Party of Ireland
- Leader: Andrew Kelly
- Chairperson: Séamus Ó Riain
- Founder: Lucinda Creighton
- Founded: 13 March 2015
- Split from: Fine Gael
- Headquarters: Cabra, Dublin
- Ideology: Anti-abortion; Social conservatism; Economic liberalism; Soft Euroscepticism; Anti-immigration
- Political position: Right-wing to far-right

Website
- centreparty.ie

The Centre Party of Ireland, formerly Renua, is a minor political party in Ireland. The party was launched on 13 March 2015, with former Fine Gael TD Lucinda Creighton as founding leader. Prior to its launch, it had used the slogan Reboot Ireland. The name Renua was intended to suggest both the English Renew and the Irish Ré Nua "New Era". The party changed its name to the Centre Party of Ireland in 2023.

Renua was founded primarily by former members of Fine Gael who left that party because they refused to endorse Fine Gael's pro-choice stance in relation to abortion. Before the 2016 Irish general election, Renua had 3 members of the Dáil through defections, however, afterwards it was left with no national representation as none of its election candidates were successful. In the immediate aftermath, all its most prominent founder-members either returned to Fine Gael or left politics. However, by virtue of securing over 2% of the national vote, Renua received significant funding from the state, which allowed the party to continue to exist in a diminished form. The party has continued to contest both national and local elections in Ireland since 2016 but has met with little to no success, and currently has no elected representatives. In parallel, since 2016 the party's ideology has shifted from its initial centre-right position to a hard-right one.

== History ==
=== Reform Alliance ===
After the 2011 general election a Fine Gael–Labour coalition government was formed. Lucinda Creighton of Fine Gael was appointed Minister of State for European Affairs. In 2013 Creighton defied the party whip on anti-abortion grounds to oppose the Protection of Life During Pregnancy Bill. Creighton and others were as a consequence expelled from the Fine Gael parliamentary party; they formed a loose alliance called the Reform Alliance. Some TDs continued as ordinary members of Fine Gael, while others left the party completely.

=== Reboot Ireland ===
The forthcoming launch of a new political party was announced at a press conference on 2 January 2015 held by Creighton, Eddie Hobbs, a financial advisor and broadcaster, and John Leahy, an Independent member of Offaly County Council.

=== Foundation of Renua Ireland ===
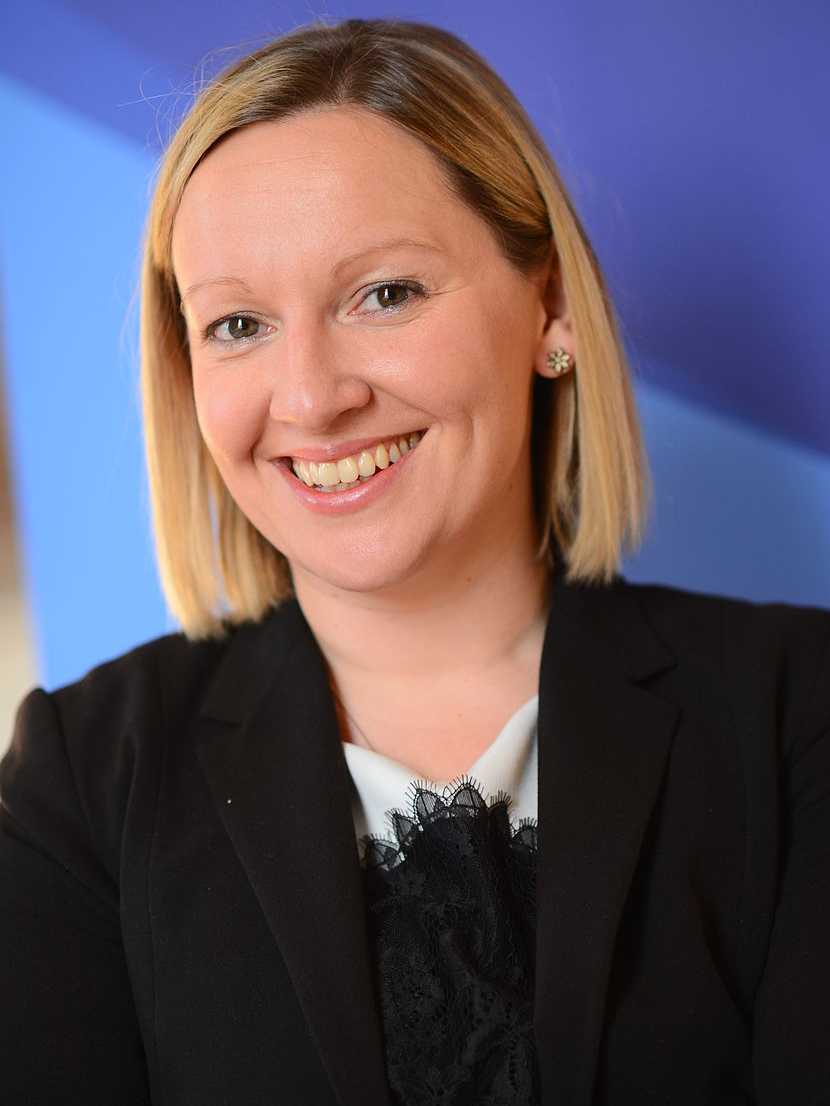
Lucinda Creighton was the party's primary founder and its first leader

The new party was launched in Dublin on Friday 13 March 2015, followed by media appearances by its leading members. Creighton and party president Eddie Hobbs appeared on RTÉ's The Late Late Show to explain their policies. Hobbs denied he was planning to stand for election, although the party's website claimed that he would be a candidate.

Its elected representatives on its foundation were TDs Lucinda Creighton, Billy Timmins and Terence Flanagan, Senators Paul Bradford and Mary Ann O'Brien, and Councillors John Leahy (Offaly) and Ronan McMahon. O'Brien, a Taoiseach's nominee to the Seanad, stated that she would not join the party until the general election campaign. Financial advisor Eddie Hobbs was announced as party president, and later announced that he would not stand for election.

Later recruits included councillors Patrick McKee (Kilkenny, elected for Fianna Fáil), James Charity (Galway, elected as an Independent), Frank Durkan (Mayo, elected as an Independent), and Keith Redmond (Fingal, elected for Fine Gael). Charity, who had joined on 20 May 2015, left Renua on 30 July. Journalist John Drennan joined as the party's director of communications and political strategy, while financial commentator Karl Deeter became the party's Ethics Officer.

The first Renua Ireland candidate to face election was Patrick McKee, in the Carlow–Kilkenny by-election on 22 May 2015. He finished fourth, with 9.5% of the first-preference vote.

Although the Irish abortion debate was what precipitated Creighton's defection from Fine Gael, the party initially stated that it was not taking a position on the issue and would allow members a free vote, before later stating under Leahy's leadership that it was an anti-abortion party that will ask all representatives to oppose a repeal of the Eighth Amendment, which places the life of the unborn on an equal footing to the life of the mother. After the passing of the abortion referendum, Renua stated it would support Varadkar's promise to keep abortion "safe, legal and RARE".

=== 2016 general election ===
The party had hoped to run between 50 and 60 candidates in the 2016 general election, with at least one in each Dáil constituency.

In January 2016, Renua announced a list of 18 candidates and published a manifesto. The main points of the manifesto included a flat personal tax rate of 23%, and a three-strikes law that would require mandatory life sentences on a third conviction for serious crimes. The flat tax rate was criticised by Fianna Fáil and Fine Gael and described by Labour's Kevin Humphreys as "too right-wing for Donald Trump".

The party had 26 candidates at the 2016 general election.

At the 2016 general election, incumbent TDs Billy Timmins, Terence Flanagan, and party leader Lucinda Creighton all lost their seats, leaving Renua with no representation in the Dáil. Nevertheless, the party won over 2% of first-preference votes, which meant that it was entitled to €250,000 of annual state funding for the duration of the 32nd Dáil. Following the defeat, Creighton insisted that Renua would continue and would field candidates for the next local elections in 2019.

=== Aftermath ===
On 14 May 2016, in the aftermath of the general election and following the formation of the new government, Creighton resigned as leader of Renua. Deputy Leader Billy Timmins had already resigned, and president Eddie Hobbs resigned from the party in June 2016.

At the party's AGM in September 2016, John Leahy, an Offaly County Councillor, was selected as party leader, and businesswoman Mailo Power was elected as party president. In November 2016, Power resigned from the position of party president and from the party. By December 2016, Councillors Patrick McKee and Keith Redmond had both resigned from the party, leaving its leader John Leahy, and Ronan McMahon, a member of South Dublin County Council, as its only elected representatives. McMahon also subsequently resigned.

At the party's second AGM, held in Tullamore in November 2017, Leahy said the party was "ready to field 17 candidates" in any general election triggered by the imminent Dáil motion of no confidence in Frances Fitzgerald. The 2017 AGM was addressed by John Waters.

Two of the founding parliamentary members of Renua later rejoined Fine Gael. Billy Timmins was selected in 2019 as candidate in Wicklow for the 2020 general election, and Terence Flanagan was elected to Dublin City Council at its 2019 election.

=== Rosa Parks controversy ===
Renua attracted controversy when its official Twitter account tweeted the view that the 1955 Rosa Parks incident, or Montgomery bus boycott, generally considered an important event in the American civil rights movement, was "orchestrated as part of an ongoing campaign" and that Parks was a "trained activist". The tweet in which the claims were made was subsequently deleted after the party received backlash on social media. John Leahy later expressed regret that the tweet was deleted.

=== Subsequent electoral activity (2019–2021) ===
Renua ran 25 candidates in the 2019 local elections, which took place on 24 May 2019. Only Leahy was elected, topping the poll in the Birr area of Offaly County Council. He resigned from the party soon after the election.

In February 2020, the party fielded 11 candidates in the 2020 general election. Its candidates received a total of 5,473 first preferences votes (0.3%), and none were elected.

For the 2021 Dublin Bay South by-election, Jacqui Gilbourne stood as Renua's candidate. She received 0.6% of first-preferences, and was eliminated on the second count.

=== Standards in Public Office Commission ===
In November 2020, the Standards in Public Office Commission (SIPO) announced that Renua were one of five political parties who failed to provide them with a set of audited accounts for 2019, in breach of statutory obligations. As of early 2021, SIPO reportedly confirmed that the party had "still not filed its accounts".

=== Rebranding as Centre Party of Ireland ===
The party rebranded as the Centre Party of Ireland in April 2023.

Three candidates stood for the Centre Party at the 2024 general election: Andrew Kelly (Dublin Central), Ian Croft (Dublin North-West) and Séan Gill (Kildare North) They failed to win any seats, having just polled 548 first-preferences (0.02%) in total.

== Policies ==
Renua has a policy programme published in addition to its election manifesto of 2016. It claims policies are centred around an evidence-based approach regardless of where that policy may be viewed ideologically. It cites proposals for State-funded community childcare schemes, capping state pensions at €100,000, and replacing defined-benefit pensions with defined-contribution pensions as examples.

The party has stated that "we would be strongly against further integration of the EU, particularly with relation to taxation or military affairs, and believe strongly that the EU works best when member countries are recognised fully as sovereign countries coming voluntarily together to promote economic cooperation rather than as a stepping stone to a federal Europe."

In 2021, Renua joint-published a COVID-19 information leaflet (with Direct Democracy Ireland and the Irish Freedom Party) advocating against the use of lockdowns as a means of controlling a virus which the leaflet stated was "harmless to the vast majority".

== Election results ==
Renua election results
Election	Candidates	Elected	±	First Pref votes	%	Rank	Leader
2016 general	26	0	▼3	46,552	2.2	9th	Lucinda Creighton
2019 European	1	0	Steady	6,897	0.4	9th	John Leahy
2019 local	25	1	Steady	10,115	0.6	10th	John Leahy
2020 general	11	0	Steady	5,473	0.3	11th	vacant
2024 general	3	0	Steady	548	0.02	20th	Andrew Kelly
