= Pat Moylan (politician) =

Irish politician (born 1946)

Cathaoirleach of Seanad Éireann
- In office 13 September 2007 – 25 May 2011
- Preceded by: Rory Kiely
- Succeeded by: Paddy Burke

Senator
- In office 13 September 2007 – 25 May 2011
- In office 17 September 1997 – 12 September 2002
- Constituency: Agricultural Panel
- In office 12 September 2002 – 13 September 2007
- Constituency: Nominated by the Taoiseach

Personal details
- Born: 12 September 1946 (age 79) Banagher, County Offaly, Ireland
- Party: Fianna Fáil
- Spouse: Mary Dunne
- Children: 4

Pat Moylan (born 12 September 1946) is an Irish former Fianna Fáil politician and member of Seanad Éireann.

Born in Banagher, County Offaly, where he still lives, he is married with three sons and one daughter.

A member of Offaly County Council from 1975 to 2004, Moylan was elected in 1997 to the 21st Seanad by the Agricultural Panel. In 2002, he was nominated by the Taoiseach Bertie Ahern as a member of the 22nd Seanad, where he was Fianna Fáil spokesperson on Tourism, Sport and Recreation and was a member of the Joint House Services Committee. He was elected to the 23rd Seanad by the Agricultural Panel in 2007.

He was elected as Cathaoirleach (chair) of the Seanad on 13 September 2007. He did not contest the 2011 Seanad election.

Oireachtas
Preceded by Rory Kiely	Cathaoirleach of Seanad Éireann; 2007–2011	Succeeded by Paddy Burke
