= John Clendennen =

Irish politician

John Clendennen TD
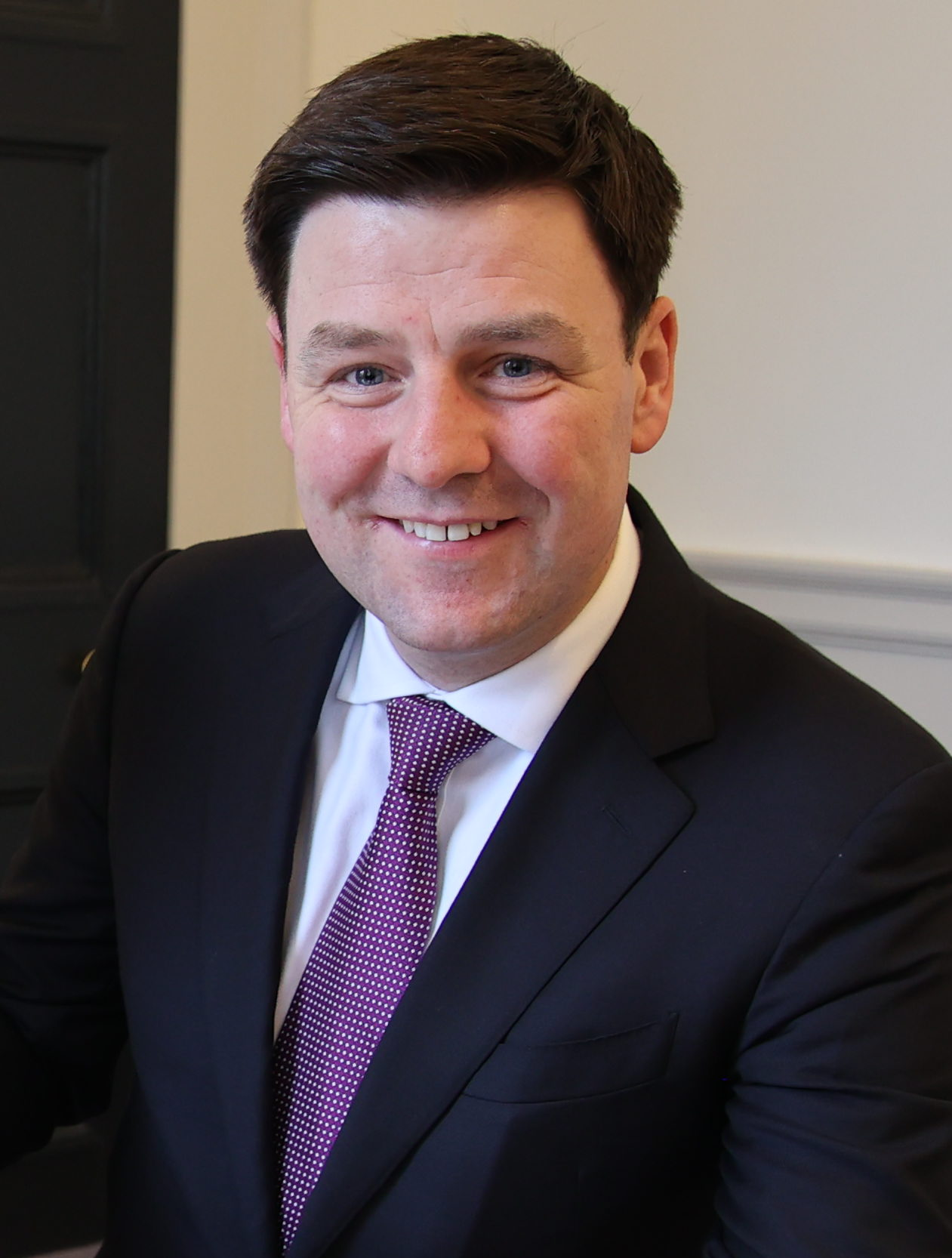
- Clendennen in 2024

Teachta Dála
- Incumbent
- Assumed office November 2024
- Constituency: Offaly

Personal details
- Born: 1981/1982 (age 43–44)
- Party: Fine Gael
- Education: Shannon College; University College Dublin

John Clendennen (born April 1982) is an Irish Fine Gael politician who has been a Teachta Dála (TD) for the Offaly constituency since the 2024 general election.

He was a member of Offaly County Council from 2014 to 2024. He is the president of the Vintners' Federation of Ireland.

== Early life ==
Clendennen was born and raised in Kinnitty, County Offaly. He is the son of Percy Clendennen, who was previously a longtime member of Offaly County Council.

Clendennen pursued higher education in hospitality and business, obtaining a degree in Business Studies and Hotel Management from Shannon College of Hotel Management in 2004. In 2009 he completed a Master's degree in Marketing at University College Dublin's Michael Smurfit Graduate Business School.

== Political career ==
Clendennen stood for election to the 24th Seanad for the Industrial and Commercial Panel in 2011, but was not successful. Clendennen was elected to Offaly County Council for the Birr area at the 2014 Irish local elections. He was re-elected in 2019 and in 2024.

Dáil	Election	Deputy (Party)	Deputy (Party)	Deputy (Party)
32nd	2016	Carol Nolan (SF)	Barry Cowen (FF)	Marcella Corcoran Kennedy (FG)
33rd	2020	Constituency abolished. See Laois–Offaly and Tipperary.		
34th	2024	Carol Nolan (Ind.)	Tony McCormack (FF)	John Clendennen (FG)
