= John Leahy (Irish politician) =

Irish auctioneer and independent politician

Leader of Renua
- In office 3 September 2016 – 11 June 2019
- Preceded by: Lucinda Creighton
- Succeeded by: Andrew Kelly (2024)

Offaly County Councillor
- Incumbent
- Assumed office 6 June 2009
- Constituency: Birr

Personal details
- Born: Kilcormac, County Offaly, Ireland
- Party: Independent (2009-2015; since 2019)
- Other political affiliations: Renua (2015–2019)
- Children: 2

John Leahy is an Irish auctioneer and independent politician, who has served as an Offaly County Councillor for the Birr area since 2009. Leahy also served as leader of Renua from 2016 to 2019.

== Career ==
Leahy was first elected to Offaly County Council in 2009 as an Independent, representing the Birr area. He was re-elected, topping the poll, in 2014. Leahy joined Renua at its foundation in 2015 and stood unsuccessfully in the 2016 general election. He was eliminated on the fifth count with 6,588 votes. Leahy was elected leader of Renua on 3 September 2016, succeeding Lucinda Creighton.

Prior to being leader of Renua, Leahy worked as a GAA Coaching and Games Promotion Officer, he has also contributed as a hurling analyst on Midlands 103.

Leahy voiced his support for the legalisation of prostitution in Ireland in an interview with Hot Press. In the same interview stated his belief that "all religions are equal" and spoke of losing his virginity (at the age of 21), along with other personal details of his life.

Following Peter Casey's performance in the 2018 presidential election, there were reports that Leahy would step aside should Casey decide to join Renua. Leahy later clarified that "I’ve no plan to stand down," adding "but if he wants to come in and help out, I’ve no difficulties with that." Leahy resigned from Renua in June 2019 following the party's poor performance in the local elections.

He was an independent candidate for the Laois–Offaly constituency at the 2020 general election. He received 5% of the first preference vote and failed to be elected.

Party political offices
Preceded by Lucinda Creighton	Leader of Renua; 2016–2019	Succeeded by Andrew Kelly (2024)
