= Irish Democratic Party =

- Founded: October 2013
- Dissolved: November 2020
- Split from: Direct Democracy Ireland
- Ideology: Participatory democracy
- Colours: Blue

Website
- irishdemocraticparty.ie

The Irish Democratic Party (IDP) was a minor Irish political party formed in 2013, as a result of a split with Direct Democracy Ireland. Another minor party of the same name but different ideology and leadership had been established in 2010 but was later dissolved.

The party advocated the introduction of participatory democracy in the Republic of Ireland. The IDP ran two candidates in the 2016 general election, the party chairperson Ken Smollen ran in Offaly. He received 2.2% of the first preference votes and was eliminated on the second count. Smollen was elected to Offaly County Council for Tullamore in the 2019 local elections on the eighth count. He received 1,054 votes and 9.5% of the first preferences. Mark Keogh, who was a candidate in the 2016 general election in Limerick, ran unsuccessfully as a Direct Democracy candidate in the 2019 local elections.

Smollen was an unsuccessful candidate at the 2020 general election in the Laois–Offaly constituency. Since November 2020, the IDP is no longer a registered political party. Smollen became an independent councillor.
