= Offaly County Council =

Local authority of County Offaly in Ireland

Offaly County Council Comhairle Chontae Uíbh Fhailí

Type
- Type: County council of County Offaly

History
- Founded: 1 April 1899

Leadership
- Cathaoirleach: Declan Harvey, FF

Structure
- Seats: 19
- Political groups: Fianna Fáil (7) Fine Gael (5) Sinn Féin (3) Independent Ireland (1) Independent (3)

Elections
- Last election: 7 June 2024

Motto
- Latin: Esto Fidelis "Be Faithful"

Meeting place
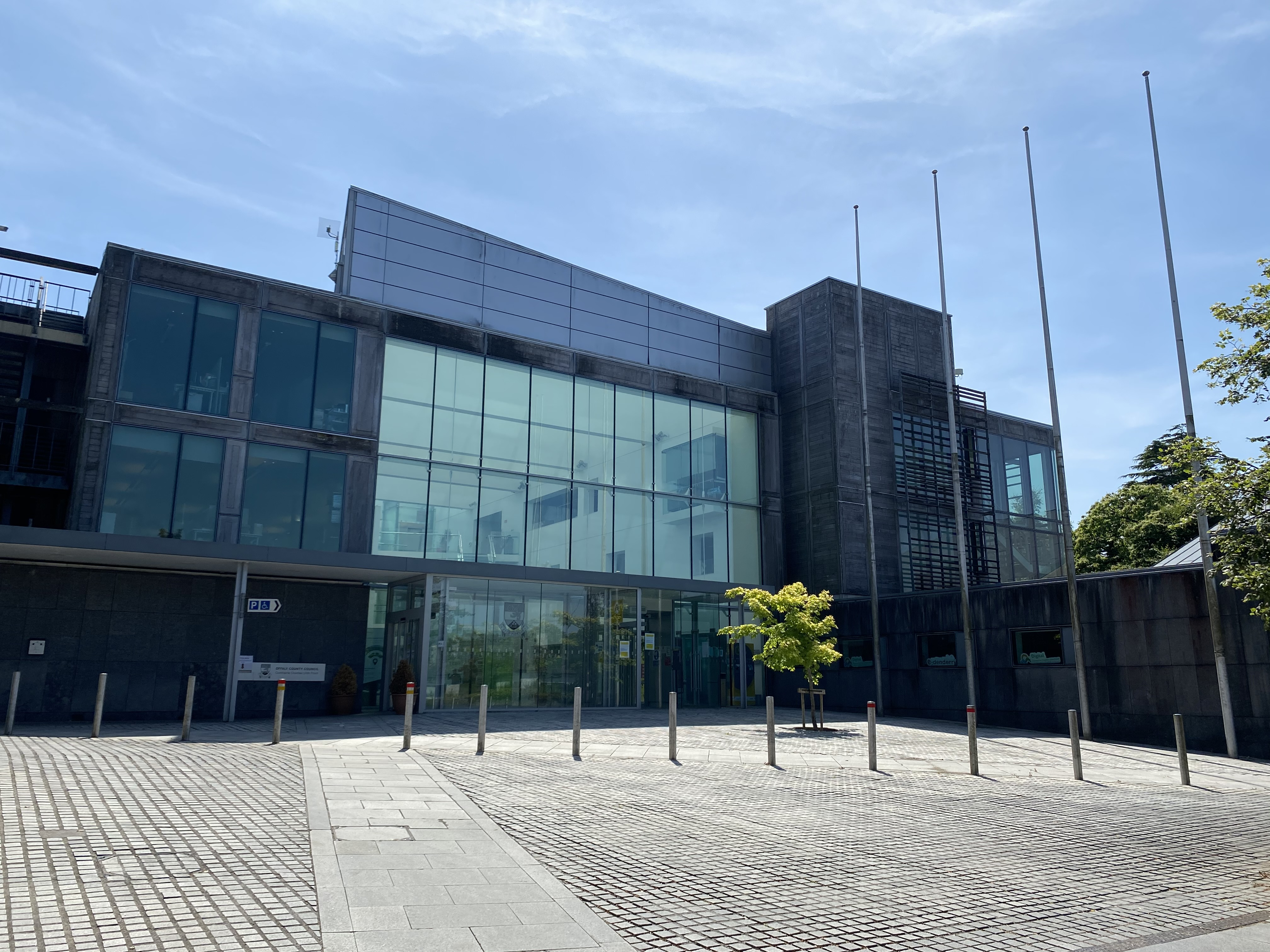
- Áras an Chontae, Tullamore

Website
- Official website

The area governed by the council

Offaly County Council (Irish: Comhairle Chontae Uíbh Fhailí) is the local authority of County Offaly, Ireland. As a county council, it is governed by the Local Government Act 2001. The council is responsible for housing and community, roads and transportation, urban planning and development, amenity and culture, and environment. The council has 19 elected members. Elections are held every five years and are by single transferable vote. The head of the council has the title of Cathaoirleach (chairperson). The county administration is headed by a chief executive, Anna Marie Delaney. The county town is Tullamore.

== History ==
Offaly County Council was established on 1 April 1899 under the Local Government (Ireland) Act 1898 for the administrative county of King's County. The 1920 King's County Council election saw significant gains for Sinn Féin. At the annual meeting of 19 June 1920, the council resolved "to revive the ancient and illustrious title of Offaly", with a motion passing to the effect, "That this County Council of the elected representatives of Offaly change the name of King's County Council to Offaly County Council, and that all printed matter dealing with the business of the Council adopt the new title". The Local Government Board for Ireland wrote to the council stating that it did not have the power to alter the name of the county. The name Offaly was used by the Irish Free State after its establishment in 1922.

Originally Tullamore Courthouse had been the meeting place of Offaly County Council. The county council moved to modern facilities at Áras an Chontae in 2002.

== Regional Assembly ==
Offaly County Council has two representatives on the Eastern and Midland Regional Assembly who are part of the Midland Strategic Planning Area Committee.

== Elections ==
The Local Government (Ireland) Act 1919 introduced the electoral system of proportional representation by means of the single transferable vote (PR-STV) for the 1920 Irish local elections. This electoral system has been retained, with the 19 members of Offaly County Council elected for a five-year term of office from multi-member local electoral areas (LEAs).

Year	FF	FG	Ren	IDP	SD	GP	SF	II	PDs	Lab	Ind.	Total
2024	8	5	0	0	0	0	3	1	—N/a	0	2	19
2019	8	4	1	1	1	1	0	—N/a	—N/a	0	3	19
2014	8	3	—N/a	—N/a	—N/a	0	3	—N/a	—N/a	0	5	19
2009	9	6	—N/a	—N/a	—N/a	0	0	—N/a	—N/a	0	6	21
2004	8	6	—N/a	—N/a	—N/a	0	0	—N/a	2	0	5	21
1999	9	7	—N/a	—N/a	—N/a	0	0	—N/a	0	1	4	21
1991	10	6	—N/a	—N/a	—N/a	0	0	—N/a	1	1	3	21
1985	12	6	—N/a	—N/a	—N/a	0	0	—N/a	—N/a	0	3	21

== Local electoral areas and municipal districts ==
County Offaly is divided into LEAs, defined by electoral divisions, to elect members of the council and into municipal districts for governance at a local level.

Municipal District and LEA	Definition	Seats
Birr	Aghancon, Ballincor, Banagher, Barna, Birr Rural, Birr Urban, Broughal, Cangort, Cloghan, Clonmacnoise, Cullenwaine, Derrinboy, Derryad, Doon, Dromoyle, Drumcullen, Dunkerrin, Eglish, Ettagh, Ferbane, Gallen, Gorteen (in the former Rural District of Roscrea No. 2), Hinds, Huntston, Kilcolman, Kilcormac, Killooly, Killyon, Kinnitty, Knockbarron, Lea, Letter, Lumcloon, Lusmagh, Mounterin, Mountheaton, Moyclare, Roscomroe, Seirkieran, Shannonbridge, Shannonharbour, Shinrone, Srah, Templeharry and Tulla	6
Edenderry	Ballaghassaan, Ballyburly, Ballycommon, Ballymacwilliam, Ballyshear, Bracknagh, Clonbulloge, Clonmore, Clonygowan, Croghan, Daingean, Edenderry Rural, Edenderry Urban, Esker, Geashill, Hammerlane, Kilclonfert, Knockdrin, Monasteroris, Mountbriscoe, ODempsey, Portarlington North, Raheenakeeran and Rathfeston	6
Tullamore	Ballycumber, Bawn, Cappancur, Clara, Derrycooly, Durrow, Gorteen (in the former Rural District of Tullamore), Kilcumreragh, Killeigh, Killoughy, Rahan, Rathrobin, Screggan, Silverbrook, Tinamuck, Tinnycross, Tullamore Rural and Tullamore Urban	7

== Councillors ==
=== 2024 seats summary ===
Party	Seats
Fianna Fáil	8
Fine Gael	5
Sinn Féin	3
Independent Ireland	1
Independent	2

=== Councillors by electoral area ===
This list reflects the order in which councillors were elected on 7 June 2024.

Council members from 2024 election
LEA	Name	Party
Birr	Peter Ormond	Fianna Fáil
Birr	John Leahy	Independent
Birr	John Clendennen (Note: Replaced during term, see table below for details.)	Fine Gael
Birr	Hugh Egan	Fine Gael
Birr	Sean Maher	Sinn Féin
Birr	Audrey Hennessy Kennedy	Fianna Fáil
Edenderry	Eddie Fitzpatrick (Note: Changed party, see table below for details.)	Fianna Fáil
Edenderry	Fergus McDonnell	Independent Ireland
Edenderry	Claire Murray	Fianna Fáil
Edenderry	Liam Quinn	Fine Gael
Edenderry	Noel Cribbin	Fine Gael
Edenderry	Claire Murray	Sinn Féin
Tullamore	Neil Feighery	Fine Gael
Tullamore	Frank Moran	Fianna Fáil
Tullamore	Seán O'Brien	Independent
Tullamore	Tony McCormack	Fianna Fáil
Tullamore	Aoife Masterson	Sinn Féin
Tullamore	Declan Harvey	Fianna Fáil
Tullamore	Ollie Bryant	Fianna Fáil

==== Co-options ====
Party	Outgoing	LEA	Reason	Date	Co-optee
Fianna Fáil	Tony McCormack	Tullamore	Elected to 34th Dáil at the 2024 general election	16 December 2024	Shane Murray
Fine Gael	John Clendennen	Birr	Elected to 34th Dáil at the 2024 general election	16 December 2024	Eleanor Clendennen

==== Changes in affiliation ====
Name	LEA	Elected as	New affiliation	Date
Eddie Fitzpatrick	Edenderry	Fianna Fáil	Independent	8 October 2024
