= Patrick Boland =

Patrick Boland may refer to:

- Patrick J. Boland (1880–1942), US representative for Pennsylvania
- Patrick Boland (Irish politician), Irish Fianna Fáil politician
