= Patrick Gorry =

Irish politician (1896–1965)

Senator
- In office 14 August 1951 – 22 July 1954
- Constituency: Agricultural Panel

Teachta Dála
- In office July 1937 – May 1951
- In office September 1927 – January 1933
- Constituency: Leix–Offaly

Personal details
- Born: 14 July 1896
- Died: 23 October 1965 (aged 69)
- Party: Fianna Fáil

Patrick Joseph Gorry (14 July 1896 – 23 October 1965) was an Irish Fianna Fáil politician. A farmer, he was elected to Dáil Éireann as a Fianna Fáil Teachta Dála (TD) for the Leix–Offaly constituency at the September 1927 general election. He was re-elected at the 1932 general election but lost his seat at the 1933 general election.

He re-gained his seat at the 1937 general election and was re-elected at each subsequent general election until he lost his seat at the 1951 general election. He was elected to the 7th Seanad in 1951 on the Agricultural Panel. He was defeated at the 1954 Seanad election.

Dáil	Election	Deputy (Party)	Deputy (Party)	Deputy (Party)	Deputy (Party)	Deputy (Party)
2nd	1921	Joseph Lynch (SF)	Patrick McCartan (SF)	Francis Bulfin (SF)	Kevin O'Higgins (SF)	4 seats 1921–1923
3rd	1922	William Davin (Lab)	Patrick McCartan (PT-SF)	Francis Bulfin (PT-SF)	Kevin O'Higgins (PT-SF)	4 seats 1921–1923
4th	1923	William Davin (Lab)	Laurence Brady (Rep)	Francis Bulfin (CnaG)	Patrick Egan (CnaG)	Seán McGuinness (Rep)
4th	1926 by-election	William Davin (Lab)	Laurence Brady (Rep)	Francis Bulfin (CnaG)	Patrick Egan (CnaG)	James Dwyer (CnaG)
5th	1927 (Jun)	William Davin (Lab)	Patrick Boland (FF)	Thomas Tynan (FF)	John Gill (Lab)	James Dwyer (CnaG)
6th	1927 (Sep)	William Davin (Lab)	Patrick Boland (FF)	Patrick Gorry (FF)	William Aird (CnaG)	James Dwyer (CnaG)
7th	1932	William Davin (Lab)	Patrick Boland (FF)	Patrick Gorry (FF)	Thomas F. O'Higgins (CnaG)	Eugene O'Brien (CnaG)
8th	1933	William Davin (Lab)	Patrick Boland (FF)	Eamon Donnelly (FF)	Thomas F. O'Higgins (CnaG)	Jack Finlay (NCP)
9th	1937	William Davin (Lab)	Patrick Boland (FF)	Patrick Gorry (FF)	Thomas F. O'Higgins (FG)	Jack Finlay (FG)
10th	1938	William Davin (Lab)	Patrick Boland (FF)	Patrick Gorry (FF)	Thomas F. O'Higgins (FG)	Daniel Hogan (FF)
11th	1943	William Davin (Lab)	Patrick Boland (FF)	Patrick Gorry (FF)	Thomas F. O'Higgins (FG)	Oliver J. Flanagan (IMR)
12th	1944	William Davin (Lab)	Patrick Boland (FF)	Patrick Gorry (FF)	Thomas F. O'Higgins (FG)	Oliver J. Flanagan (IMR)
13th	1948	William Davin (Lab)	Patrick Boland (FF)	Patrick Gorry (FF)	Tom O'Higgins, Jnr (FG)	Oliver J. Flanagan (Ind.)
14th	1951	William Davin (Lab)	Patrick Boland (FF)	Peadar Maher (FF)	Tom O'Higgins, Jnr (FG)	Oliver J. Flanagan (Ind.)
15th	1954	William Davin (Lab)	Nicholas Egan (FF)	Peadar Maher (FF)	Tom O'Higgins, Jnr (FG)	Oliver J. Flanagan (FG)
15th	1956 by-election	Kieran Egan (FF)	Nicholas Egan (FF)	Peadar Maher (FF)	Tom O'Higgins, Jnr (FG)	Oliver J. Flanagan (FG)
16th	1957	Kieran Egan (FF)	Nicholas Egan (FF)	Peadar Maher (FF)	Tom O'Higgins, Jnr (FG)	Oliver J. Flanagan (FG)
17th	1961	Kieran Egan (FF)	Nicholas Egan (FF)	Patrick Lalor (FF)	Tom O'Higgins, Jnr (FG)	Oliver J. Flanagan (FG)
18th	1965	Henry Byrne (Lab)	Nicholas Egan (FF)	Patrick Lalor (FF)	Tom O'Higgins, Jnr (FG)	Oliver J. Flanagan (FG)
19th	1969	Ger Connolly (FF)	Bernard Cowen (FF)	Patrick Lalor (FF)	Tom Enright (FG)	Oliver J. Flanagan (FG)
20th	1973	Ger Connolly (FF)	Charles McDonald (FG)	Patrick Lalor (FF)	Tom Enright (FG)	Oliver J. Flanagan (FG)
21st	1977	Ger Connolly (FF)	Bernard Cowen (FF)	Patrick Lalor (FF)	Tom Enright (FG)	Oliver J. Flanagan (FG)
22nd	1981	Ger Connolly (FF)	Bernard Cowen (FF)	Liam Hyland (FF)	Tom Enright (FG)	Oliver J. Flanagan (FG)
23rd	1982 (Feb)	Ger Connolly (FF)	Bernard Cowen (FF)	Liam Hyland (FF)	Tom Enright (FG)	Oliver J. Flanagan (FG)
24th	1982 (Nov)	Ger Connolly (FF)	Bernard Cowen (FF)	Liam Hyland (FF)	Tom Enright (FG)	Oliver J. Flanagan (FG)
24th	1984 by-election	Ger Connolly (FF)	Brian Cowen (FF)	Liam Hyland (FF)	Tom Enright (FG)	Oliver J. Flanagan (FG)
25th	1987	Ger Connolly (FF)	Brian Cowen (FF)	Liam Hyland (FF)	Tom Enright (FG)	Charles Flanagan (FG)
26th	1989	Ger Connolly (FF)	Brian Cowen (FF)	Liam Hyland (FF)	Tom Enright (FG)	Charles Flanagan (FG)
27th	1992	Ger Connolly (FF)	Brian Cowen (FF)	Liam Hyland (FF)	Pat Gallagher (Lab)	Charles Flanagan (FG)
28th	1997	John Moloney (FF)	Brian Cowen (FF)	Seán Fleming (FF)	Tom Enright (FG)	Charles Flanagan (FG)
29th	2002	John Moloney (FF)	Brian Cowen (FF)	Seán Fleming (FF)	Olwyn Enright (FG)	Tom Parlon (PDs)
30th	2007	John Moloney (FF)	Brian Cowen (FF)	Seán Fleming (FF)	Olwyn Enright (FG)	Charles Flanagan (FG)
31st	2011	Brian Stanley (SF)	Barry Cowen (FF)	Seán Fleming (FF)	Marcella Corcoran Kennedy (FG)	Charles Flanagan (FG)
32nd	2016	Constituency abolished. See Laois and Offaly.				
33rd	2020	Brian Stanley (SF)	Barry Cowen (FF)	Seán Fleming (FF)	Carol Nolan (Ind.)	Charles Flanagan (FG)
33rd	2024	Brian Stanley (SF)	(Vacant)	Seán Fleming (FF)	Carol Nolan (Ind.)	Charles Flanagan (FG)
34th	2024	Constituency abolished. See Laois and Offaly.				
