= Laois–Offaly =

Dáil constituency (1921–2016, 2020–2024)

- Former Dáil constituency
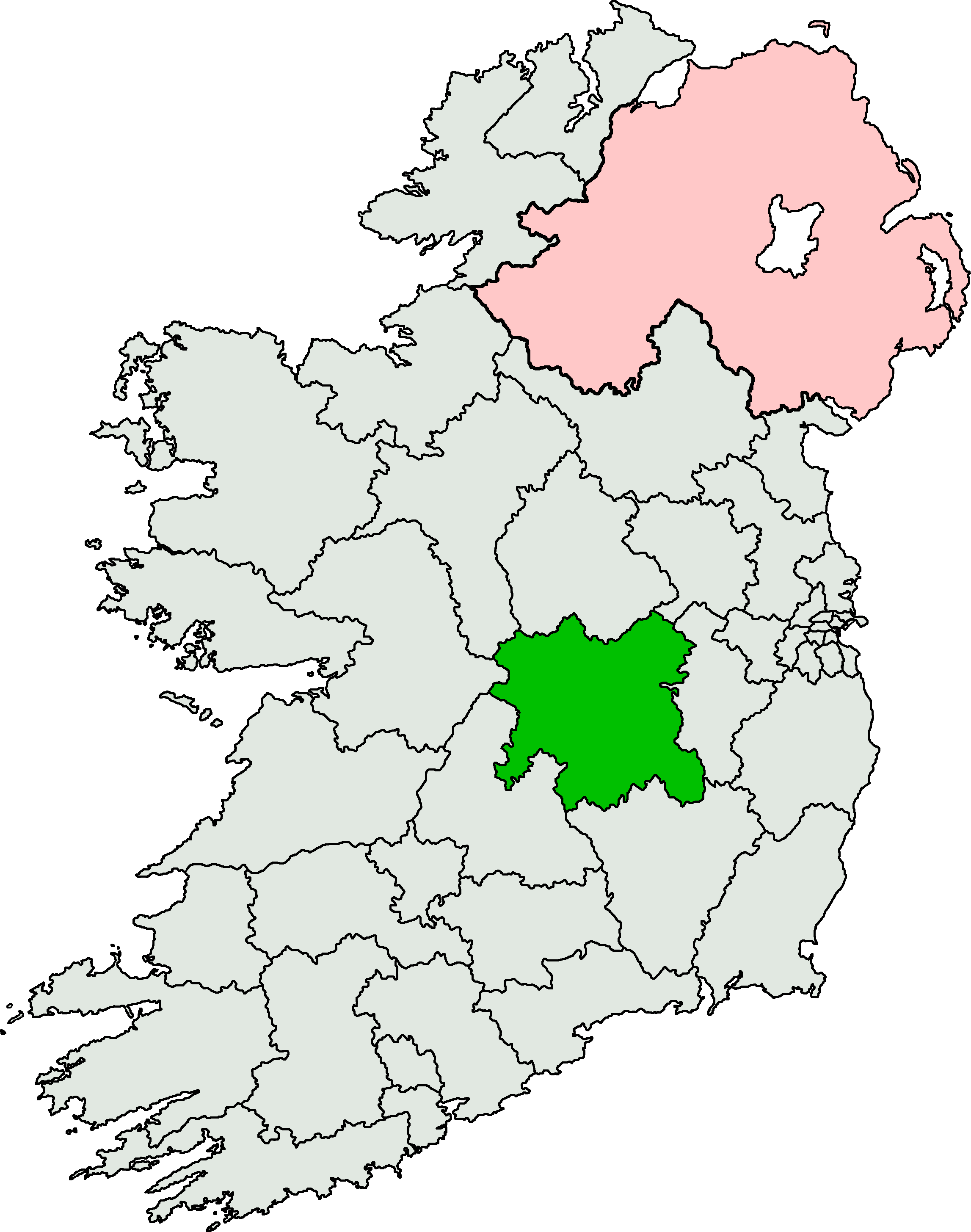
- Location of Laois–Offaly within Ireland
- Major settlements: Birr; Edenderry; Mountrath; Mountmellick; Portlaoise; Tullamore

Former constituency
- Created: 2020
- Abolished: 2024
- Seats: 5 (2020–2024)
- Local government areas: County Laois; County Offaly
- Created from: Laois; Offaly
- Replaced by: Laois; Offaly
- EP constituency: South

Laois–Offaly (formerly King's County–Queen's County, Leix–Offaly and Laoighis–Offaly) was a parliamentary constituency which was represented in Dáil Éireann, the house of representatives of the Oireachtas (the legislature of Ireland), from 1921 to 2016 and again from 2020 to 2024. The constituency elected deputies (Teachtaí Dála, commonly known as TDs) on the system of proportional representation by means of the single transferable vote (PR-STV).

== History and boundaries ==
Laois–Offaly
- Former Dáil constituency

Former constituency
- Created: 1921
- Abolished: 2016
- Seats: 4 (1921–1923); 5 (1923–2016)
- Local government areas: County Laois; County Offaly
- Created from: King's County; Queen's County

Laois–Offaly was created under the Government of Ireland Act 1920 as King's County–Queen's County (the respective names of County Offaly and County Laois before independence). The two counties were combined in a single four-member constituency for the House of Commons of Southern Ireland. It was known in the Dáil as Leix–Offaly, and first used for the 1921 general election to the Southern Ireland House of Commons. The Sinn Féin candidates elected unopposed preferred to sit in the Second Dáil (1921–1922). It was used at every subsequent general election until 2011. It was abolished at the 2016 general election, and was replaced by the new constituencies of Laois and Offaly.

It was re-established by the Electoral (Amendment) (Dáil Constituencies) Act 2017, which came into effect for the 2020 general election.

In August 2023, the Electoral Commission published its review of constituency boundaries in Ireland, which recommended that the constituency of Laois–Offaly be abolished, with the creation of two new three-seat constituencies: Laois and Offaly. Each new constituency would elect 3 deputies. These changes took effect for the 2024 general election under the Electoral (Amendment) Act 2023.

Changes to the Laois–Offaly constituency
Years	TDs	Boundaries	Notes
1921–1923	4	County Laois (Queen's County) and County Offaly (King's County)	In the Dáil record, the constituency was variously described as Leix and Offaly and Offaly, Leix
1923–2011	5	County Laois and County Offaly	Named as Leix–Offaly.; Renamed as Laoighis–Offaly from 1961; Renamed as Laois–Offaly from 2007.
2011–2016	5	County Laois; and County Offaly except the areas in the Tipperary North constituency.	Transfer to Tipperary North of the electoral divisions of Aghacon, Barna, Cangort, Cullenwaine, Dunkerrin, Ettagh, Gorteen, Mountheaton, Shinrone, Templeharry, in the former rural district of Roscrea No. 2, to Tipperary North.
2016–2020	—	Constituency abolished.	Split into constituencies of Laois and Offaly.
2020–2024	5	County Laois; except the area in the Kildare South constituency; County Offaly; except the area in the Kildare South constituency.	Parts in Kildare South: County Laois, the electoral divisions of: Ballybrittas, Jamestown, Kilmullen, Portarlington South, in the former rural district of Mountmellick; County Offaly, the electoral division of: Portarlington North, in the former rural district of Tullamore.
2024–	—	Constituency abolished.	Split into constituencies of Laois and Offaly.

== TDs ==
Teachtaí Dála (TDs) for Laois–Offaly 1921–2024
Key to parties: CnaG = Cumann na nGaedheal; FF = Fianna Fáil; FG = Fine Gael; IMR = Monetary Reform; Ind. = Independent; Lab = Labour; NCP = National Centre Party; PDs = Progressive Democrats; Rep = Republican; SF = Sinn Féin; PT-SF = Sinn Féin (Pro-Treaty)
Dáil	Election	Deputy (Party)	Deputy (Party)	Deputy (Party)	Deputy (Party)	Deputy (Party)
2nd	1921	Joseph Lynch (SF)	Patrick McCartan (SF)	Francis Bulfin (SF)	Kevin O'Higgins (SF)	4 seats 1921–1923
3rd	1922	William Davin (Lab)	Patrick McCartan (PT-SF)	Francis Bulfin (PT-SF)	Kevin O'Higgins (PT-SF)	4 seats 1921–1923
4th	1923	William Davin (Lab)	Laurence Brady (Rep)	Francis Bulfin (CnaG)	Patrick Egan (CnaG)	Seán McGuinness (Rep)
4th	1926 by-election	William Davin (Lab)	Laurence Brady (Rep)	Francis Bulfin (CnaG)	Patrick Egan (CnaG)	James Dwyer (CnaG)
5th	1927 (Jun)	William Davin (Lab)	Patrick Boland (FF)	Thomas Tynan (FF)	John Gill (Lab)	James Dwyer (CnaG)
6th	1927 (Sep)	William Davin (Lab)	Patrick Boland (FF)	Patrick Gorry (FF)	William Aird (CnaG)	James Dwyer (CnaG)
7th	1932	William Davin (Lab)	Patrick Boland (FF)	Patrick Gorry (FF)	Thomas F. O'Higgins (CnaG)	Eugene O'Brien (CnaG)
8th	1933	William Davin (Lab)	Patrick Boland (FF)	Eamon Donnelly (FF)	Thomas F. O'Higgins (CnaG)	Jack Finlay (NCP)
9th	1937	William Davin (Lab)	Patrick Boland (FF)	Patrick Gorry (FF)	Thomas F. O'Higgins (FG)	Jack Finlay (FG)
10th	1938	William Davin (Lab)	Patrick Boland (FF)	Patrick Gorry (FF)	Thomas F. O'Higgins (FG)	Daniel Hogan (FF)
11th	1943	William Davin (Lab)	Patrick Boland (FF)	Patrick Gorry (FF)	Thomas F. O'Higgins (FG)	Oliver J. Flanagan (IMR)
12th	1944	William Davin (Lab)	Patrick Boland (FF)	Patrick Gorry (FF)	Thomas F. O'Higgins (FG)	Oliver J. Flanagan (IMR)
13th	1948	William Davin (Lab)	Patrick Boland (FF)	Patrick Gorry (FF)	Tom O'Higgins, Jnr (FG)	Oliver J. Flanagan (Ind.)
14th	1951	William Davin (Lab)	Patrick Boland (FF)	Peadar Maher (FF)	Tom O'Higgins, Jnr (FG)	Oliver J. Flanagan (Ind.)
15th	1954	William Davin (Lab)	Nicholas Egan (FF)	Peadar Maher (FF)	Tom O'Higgins, Jnr (FG)	Oliver J. Flanagan (FG)
15th	1956 by-election	Kieran Egan (FF)	Nicholas Egan (FF)	Peadar Maher (FF)	Tom O'Higgins, Jnr (FG)	Oliver J. Flanagan (FG)
16th	1957	Kieran Egan (FF)	Nicholas Egan (FF)	Peadar Maher (FF)	Tom O'Higgins, Jnr (FG)	Oliver J. Flanagan (FG)
17th	1961	Kieran Egan (FF)	Nicholas Egan (FF)	Patrick Lalor (FF)	Tom O'Higgins, Jnr (FG)	Oliver J. Flanagan (FG)
18th	1965	Henry Byrne (Lab)	Nicholas Egan (FF)	Patrick Lalor (FF)	Tom O'Higgins, Jnr (FG)	Oliver J. Flanagan (FG)
19th	1969	Ger Connolly (FF)	Bernard Cowen (FF)	Patrick Lalor (FF)	Tom Enright (FG)	Oliver J. Flanagan (FG)
20th	1973	Ger Connolly (FF)	Charles McDonald (FG)	Patrick Lalor (FF)	Tom Enright (FG)	Oliver J. Flanagan (FG)
21st	1977	Ger Connolly (FF)	Bernard Cowen (FF)	Patrick Lalor (FF)	Tom Enright (FG)	Oliver J. Flanagan (FG)
22nd	1981	Ger Connolly (FF)	Bernard Cowen (FF)	Liam Hyland (FF)	Tom Enright (FG)	Oliver J. Flanagan (FG)
23rd	1982 (Feb)	Ger Connolly (FF)	Bernard Cowen (FF)	Liam Hyland (FF)	Tom Enright (FG)	Oliver J. Flanagan (FG)
24th	1982 (Nov)	Ger Connolly (FF)	Bernard Cowen (FF)	Liam Hyland (FF)	Tom Enright (FG)	Oliver J. Flanagan (FG)
24th	1984 by-election	Ger Connolly (FF)	Brian Cowen (FF)	Liam Hyland (FF)	Tom Enright (FG)	Oliver J. Flanagan (FG)
25th	1987	Ger Connolly (FF)	Brian Cowen (FF)	Liam Hyland (FF)	Tom Enright (FG)	Charles Flanagan (FG)
26th	1989	Ger Connolly (FF)	Brian Cowen (FF)	Liam Hyland (FF)	Tom Enright (FG)	Charles Flanagan (FG)
27th	1992	Ger Connolly (FF)	Brian Cowen (FF)	Liam Hyland (FF)	Pat Gallagher (Lab)	Charles Flanagan (FG)
28th	1997	John Moloney (FF)	Brian Cowen (FF)	Seán Fleming (FF)	Tom Enright (FG)	Charles Flanagan (FG)
29th	2002	John Moloney (FF)	Brian Cowen (FF)	Seán Fleming (FF)	Olwyn Enright (FG)	Tom Parlon (PDs)
30th	2007	John Moloney (FF)	Brian Cowen (FF)	Seán Fleming (FF)	Olwyn Enright (FG)	Charles Flanagan (FG)
31st	2011	Brian Stanley (SF)	Barry Cowen (FF)	Seán Fleming (FF)	Marcella Corcoran Kennedy (FG)	Charles Flanagan (FG)
32nd	2016	Constituency abolished. See Laois and Offaly.				
33rd	2020	Brian Stanley (SF)	Barry Cowen (FF)	Seán Fleming (FF)	Carol Nolan (Ind.)	Charles Flanagan (FG)
33rd	2024	Brian Stanley (SF)	(Vacant)	Seán Fleming (FF)	Carol Nolan (Ind.)	Charles Flanagan (FG)
34th	2024	Constituency abolished. See Laois and Offaly.				

Note: The columns in this table are used only for presentational purposes, and no significance should be attached to the order of columns. For details of the order in which seats were won at each election, see the detailed results of that election.

== Elections ==
*: Outgoing TD

=== 2020 general election ===
2020 general election: Laois-Offaly
Party	Candidate	FPv%	Count										
Party	Candidate	FPv%	1	2	3	4	5	6	7	8	9	10	11
Sinn Féin	Brian Stanley	24.0	16,654										
Fianna Fáil	Barry Cowen	12.5	8,677	8,889	8,919	9,130	9,166	9,242	9,698	12,162			
Fianna Fáil	Seán Fleming	11.0	7,636	8,116	8,190	9,106	9,162	9,736	9,835	10,327	10,676	10,868	11,364
Fine Gael	Charles Flanagan	10.8	7,463	7,641	7,675	7,791	7,821	8,203	8,287	8,396	8,418	11,757	
Independent	Carol Nolan	7.8	5,436	6,182	6,362	6,434	6,806	7,109	8,353	8,848	8,927	9,364	12,521
Fine Gael	Marcella Corcoran Kennedy	6.5	4,519	4,585	4,594	4,643	4,666	4,783	4,917	5,157	5,195		
Fianna Fáil	Peter Ormond	5.9	4,073	4,132	4,137	4,320	4,334	4,360	4,449				
Green	Pippa Hackett	5.0	3,494	3,921	3,991	4,081	4,565	5,243	5,811	5,941	5,964	6,468	7,109
Independent	John Leahy	5.0	3,463	3,725	3,862	3,876	4,063	4,192	4,821	5,172	5,252	5,669	
Irish Democratic	Ken Smollen	3.8	2,611	3,173	3,261	3,274	3,640	3,941					
Labour	Noel Tuohy	2.9	2,011	2,596	2,664	2,806	3,190						
Fianna Fáil	Pauline Flanagan	2.5	1,744	1,850	1,874								
Solidarity–PBP	Stephen Tynan (Note: Tynan was a member of People Before Profit.)	1.3	910	2,128	2,243	2,273							
National Party	John Daly	0.6	441	557									
Renua	Noel O'Rourke	0.4	290	356									
Electorate: 110,839 Valid: 69,422 Spoilt: 576 Quota: 11,571 Turnout: 69,998 (63.2%)

=== 2011 general election ===
2011 general election: Laois–Offaly
Party	Candidate	FPv%	Count												
Party	Candidate	FPv%	1	2	3	4	5	6	7	8	9	10	11	12	13
Fine Gael	Charles Flanagan	14.1	10,443	10,432	10,448	10,461	10,491	10,660	11,007	13,515					
Fianna Fáil	Barry Cowen	11.1	8,257	8,281	8,285	8,302	8,332	8,497	8,636	8,647	8,651	9,414	9,656	10,654	11,860
Sinn Féin	Brian Stanley	10.8	8,032	8,042	8,058	8,079	8,132	8,593	8,919	9,112	9,170	9,793	10,062	10,707	11,775
Fianna Fáil	Seán Fleming	8.1	6,024	6,026	6,036	6,043	6,050	6,101	6,206	6,569	6,685	6,838	6,967	10,193	10,851
Fine Gael	Marcella Corcoran Kennedy	7.8	5,817	5,838	5,871	5,919	5,978	6,163	6,289	6,595	6,989	8,291	11,837	12,106	13,128
Labour	John Whelan	7.8	5,802	5,805	5,890	5,912	5,951	6,255	6,489	6,764	6,865	7,288	7,814	8,208	9,026
Fianna Fáil	John Moloney	7.5	5,579	5,588	5,597	5,607	5,616	5,670	5,989	6,093	6,116	6,293	6,399		
Independent	John Leahy	6.6	4,882	4,889	4,908	4,960	5,032	5,259	5,438	5,449	5,452				
Fine Gael	Liam Quinn	6.0	4,482	4,486	4,499	4,516	4,526	4,619	4,784	5,348	5,797	6,275			
Independent	John Foley	6.0	4,465	4,469	4,478	4,500	4,524	4,930	5,490	5,506	5,513	6,330	7,231	7,521	
Fine Gael	John Moran	5.8	4,306	4,307	4,318	4,326	4,328	4,373	4,437						
Independent	Eddie Fitzpatrick	3.4	2,544	2,553	2,565	2,586	2,619	2,776							
Independent	Rotimi Adebari	0.8	628	634	662	675	691								
Independent	John Bracken	0.8	625	656	665	674	695								
Socialist Party	Ray Fitzpatrick (Note: Fitzpatrick campaigned as a member of the United Left Alliance)	0.8	561	562	584	594	604								
Independent	Fergus McDonnell	0.7	525	526	527	533	542								
Independent	Liam Dumpleton	0.5	382	393	399	436									
Independent	James Fanning	0.5	335	343	352										
Green	Christopher Fettes	0.4	306	308											
Independent	John Boland	0.2	119												
Independent	Michael Cox	0.1	60												
Electorate: 106,312 Valid: 74,234 Spoilt: 979 (1.3%) Quota: 12,373 Turnout: 75,213 (70.7%)

=== 2007 general election ===
2007 general election: Laois–Offaly
Party	Candidate	FPv%	Count										
Party	Candidate	FPv%	1	2	3	4	5	6	7	8	9	10	11
Fianna Fáil	Brian Cowen	26.7	19,102										
Fine Gael	Charles Flanagan	12.7	9,067	9,210	9,259	9,326	9,380	9,834	10,215	10,965	12,108		
Fine Gael	Olwyn Enright	11.6	8,297	9,091	9,195	9,354	9,673	10,038	11,808	12,544			
Fianna Fáil	Seán Fleming	11.3	8,064	10,089	10,131	10,200	10,313	10,437	10,561	11,231	12,533		
Fianna Fáil	John Moloney	10.1	7,242	8,010	8,042	8,075	8,116	8,235	8,298	8,967	9,895	10,008	10,277
Fianna Fáil	John Foley	8.3	5,899	7,924	7,958	7,990	8,114	8,141	8,310	8,619	9,480	9,618	9,966
Progressive Democrats	Tom Parlon	5.9	4,233	4,829	4,867	4,933	5,020	5,093	5,249	5,514			
Sinn Féin	Brian Stanley	5.1	3,656	3,802	3,862	3,975	4,120	4,373	4,477				
Fine Gael	Molly Buckley	3.1	2,196	2,533	2,595	2,672	2,873	2,995					
Labour	Jim O'Brien	1.8	1,278	1,310	1,530	1,711	1,746						
Independent	John Bracken	1.3	934	1,144	1,204	1,252							
Green	Máire McKay	1.1	812	861	902								
Labour	David Whelan	0.6	425	475									
Christian Solidarity	Colm Callanan	0.2	156	161									
Independent	Joseph McCormack	0.1	85	88									
Independent	Noel O'Gara	0.1	45	48									
Electorate: 103,673 Valid: 71,491 Spoilt: 662 (0.9%) Quota: 11,916 Turnout: 72,153 (69.6%)

=== 2002 general election ===
2002 general election: Laoighis–Offaly
Party	Candidate	FPv%	Count					
Party	Candidate	FPv%	1	2	3	4	5	6
Fianna Fáil	Brian Cowen	19.8	12,529					
Progressive Democrats	Tom Parlon	14.4	9,088	9,358	9,531	9,689	10,572	
Fianna Fáil	John Moloney	12.8	8,093	8,260	8,343	8,384	8,848	10,972
Fine Gael	Olwyn Enright	12.7	8,053	8,255	8,403	8,897	10,205	11,005
Fianna Fáil	Seán Fleming	11.2	7,091	7,530	7,642	7,728	8,361	10,453
Fine Gael	Charles Flanagan	10.3	6,500	6,530	6,646	6,865	7,384	7,606
Fianna Fáil	Ger Killally	7.5	4,719	5,387	5,437	5,530	6,062	
Sinn Féin	Brian Stanley	4.1	2,600	2,639	2,820	3,017		
Ind. Health Alliance	Molly Buckley	2.7	1,695	1,783	1,966	2,356		
Labour	John Dwyer	2.5	1,600	1,675	1,809			
Green	Christopher Fettes	0.8	520	529				
Independent	Joe McCormack	0.6	351	353				
Independent	John Kelly	0.4	236	237				
Christian Solidarity	Michael Redmond	0.2	142	144				
Electorate: 95,373 Valid: 63,217 Spoilt: 671 (1.1%) Quota: 10,537 Turnout: 63,888 (67.0%)

=== 1997 general election ===
1997 general election: Laoighis–Offaly
Party	Candidate	FPv%	Count				
Party	Candidate	FPv%	1	2	3	4	5
Fianna Fáil	Brian Cowen	18.7	10,865				
Fine Gael	Tom Enright	14.4	8,375	8,478	8,760	9,192	9,558
Fianna Fáil	John Moloney	14.2	8,271	8,406	8,702	9,800	
Fine Gael	Charles Flanagan	13.9	8,104	8,132	8,384	8,995	9,266
Labour	Pat Gallagher	11.6	6,741	6,847	7,101	7,542	8,053
Fianna Fáil	Seán Fleming	9.4	5,481	5,810	6,160	6,904	10,367
Fianna Fáil	Gerard Killally	7.5	4,328	4,707	4,899	5,436	
Progressive Democrats	Cathy Honan	6.5	3,778	3,865	4,090		
National Party	Peter McNamee	1.9	1,099	1,105			
Independent	Sean Fennelly	0.9	516	525			
Independent	Joe McCormack	0.7	378	379			
Natural Law	Paddy Seery	0.2	134	137			
Electorate: 83,232 Valid: 58,070 Spoilt: 542 (0.9%) Quota: 9,679 Turnout: 58,612 (69.5%)

=== 1992 general election ===
1992 general election: Laoighis–Offaly
Party	Candidate	FPv%	Count									
Party	Candidate	FPv%	1	2	3	4	5	6	7	8	9	10
Fianna Fáil	Brian Cowen	18.9	10,117									
Fianna Fáil	Liam Hyland	15.6	8,361	8,548	8,560	8,604	8,675	8,698	8,794	9,246		
Labour	Pat Gallagher	13.0	6,966	7,053	7,061	7,097	7,239	7,398	7,708	8,634	8,666	9,098
Fine Gael	Charles Flanagan	11.0	5,876	5,903	5,914	5,936	5,968	6,203	6,459	7,403	7,491	8,468
Fine Gael	Tom Enright	10.7	5,742	5,824	5,852	5,864	5,955	6,414	6,768	7,351	7,374	7,545
Fianna Fáil	John Moloney	9.4	5,018	5,103	5,105	5,123	5,151	5,166	5,226	5,519	5,614	
Fianna Fáil	Ger Connolly	8.0	4,316	4,932	4,952	4,960	5,074	5,115	5,378	5,726	5,788	9,010
Progressive Democrats	Cathy Honan	6.6	3,560	3,587	3,594	3,619	3,640	3,729	3,875			
Independent	John Butterfield	2.8	1,508	1,538	1,565	1,601	1,688	1,829				
Fine Gael	Mary A. Buckley	2.2	1,165	1,180	1,182	1,186	1,193					
Sinn Féin	John Joseph Carroll	1.2	665	675	681	689						
Independent	Joe McCormack	0.5	244	245	252							
Independent	Edward Delaney	0.3	132	136								
Electorate: 77,291 Valid: 53,670 Spoilt: 753 (1.4%) Quota: 8,946 Turnout: 54,423 (70.4%)

=== 1989 general election ===
1989 general election: Laoighis–Offaly
Party	Candidate	FPv%	Count						
Party	Candidate	FPv%	1	2	3	4	5	6	7
Fianna Fáil	Liam Hyland	16.1	8,443	8,473	8,503	8,636	11,434		
Fianna Fáil	Ger Connolly	15.2	7,936	7,946	8,045	8,472	9,072		
Fine Gael	Charles Flanagan	13.6	7,142	7,182	7,864	8,476	8,957		
Fianna Fáil	Brian Cowen	13.6	7,103	7,107	7,210	7,597	8,129	10,235	
Fine Gael	Tom Enright	12.7	6,627	6,656	7,176	7,724	7,952	8,056	8,271
Fianna Fáil	Joseph Dunne	9.5	4,970	5,062	5,071	5,197			
Progressive Democrats	Cathy Honan	8.4	4,411	4,460	4,693	5,513	5,809	5,959	6,120
Labour	Pat Gallagher	5.8	3,030	3,086	3,693				
Fine Gael	Tommy McKeigue	4.4	2,318	2,338					
Independent	Joe McCormack	0.8	394						
Electorate: 75,120 Valid: 52,374 Quota: 8,730 Turnout: 69.7%

=== 1987 general election ===
1987 general election: Laoighis–Offaly
Party	Candidate	FPv%	Count								
Party	Candidate	FPv%	1	2	3	4	5	6	7	8	9
Fianna Fáil	Liam Hyland	16.4	9,208	9,243	9,331	9,418					
Fianna Fáil	Brian Cowen	16.3	9,168	9,172	9,296	9,636					
Fianna Fáil	Ger Connolly	13.3	7,472	7,480	7,620	7,916	8,167	8,346	8,472	11,852	
Progressive Democrats	Cathy Honan	9.5	5,353	5,389	5,618	5,771	6,250	6,261	6,797	7,205	7,529
Fine Gael	Charles Flanagan	9.5	5,317	5,345	5,484	5,517	6,735	6,756	8,972	9,267	9,481
Fine Gael	Tom Enright	9.2	5,136	5,162	5,257	5,429	6,305	6,335	7,691	7,870	8,022
Fianna Fáil	Jeremiah Lodge	7.8	4,356	4,415	4,501	4,594	4,628	4,668	4,849		
Fine Gael	Charles McDonald	7.0	3,921	3,959	4,089	4,109	4,510	4,511			
Fine Gael	Michael Fox	5.5	3,105	3,105	3,239	3,295					
Sinn Féin	John Carroll	2.5	1,405	1,425	1,529						
Labour	Thomas Phelan	1.5	818	853							
Independent	May Keeley	0.9	509	519							
Independent	Joe McCormack	0.6	354								
Electorate: 75,201 Valid: 56,122 Quota: 9,354 Turnout: 74.6%

=== 1984 by-election ===
Fianna Fáil TD Bernard Cowen died on 24 January 1984. The by-election was held on 14 June 1984, and was won by Brian Cowen, son of the deceased TD.

1984 by-election: Laoighis–Offaly
Party	Candidate	FPv%	Count
Party	Candidate	FPv%	1
Fianna Fáil	Brian Cowen	54.7	26,022
Fine Gael	Pádraig Horan	38.2	18,173
Labour	Seán O'Brien	3.7	1,737
Independent	Joe McCormack	3.1	1,471
Communist	Eoin Ó Murchú	0.3	120
Independent	Jim Tallon	0.1	58
Electorate: 74,087 Valid: 47,581 Quota: 23,791 Turnout: 64.2%

=== November 1982 general election ===
November 1982 general election: Laoighis–Offaly
Party	Candidate	FPv%	Count						
Party	Candidate	FPv%	1	2	3	4	5	6	7
Fine Gael	Oliver J. Flanagan	15.3	8,428	8,946	9,110	10,917			
Fianna Fáil	Liam Hyland	14.9	8,181	8,260	10,899				
Fianna Fáil	Ger Connolly	14.4	7,910	8,105	8,730	8,922	9,823		
Fianna Fáil	Bernard Cowen	13.5	7,423	7,559	7,980	8,149	8,874	8,950	9,609
Fine Gael	Tom Enright	12.1	6,646	6,878	6,963	8,293	8,338	9,573	
Fine Gael	Charles McDonald	10.9	5,973	6,366	6,542	7,478	7,553	7,970	7,981
Fianna Fáil	Jeremiah Lodge	7.4	4,090	4,211					
Fine Gael	Michael Fox	7.3	4,019	4,447	4,481				
Labour	Seán Sheehan	3.7	2,050						
Independent	Joe McCormack	0.4	195						
Electorate: 71,962 Valid: 54,915 Quota: 9,153 Turnout: 76.3%

=== February 1982 general election ===
February 1982 general election: Laoighis–Offaly
Party	Candidate	FPv%	Count							
Party	Candidate	FPv%	1	2	3	4	5	6	7	8
Fianna Fáil	Liam Hyland	15.9	8,539	8,646	8,674	8,856	11,157			
Fianna Fáil	Ger Connolly	15.1	8,102	8,115	8,367	8,394	8,865	9,942		
Fine Gael	Oliver J. Flanagan	13.5	7,252	7,371	7,732	8,545	8,719	8,810	8,823	10,365
Fianna Fáil	Bernard Cowen	13.3	7,156	7,165	7,288	7,297	7,649	8,559	9,488	
Fine Gael	Tom Enright	11.3	6,078	6,168	6,350	6,836	6,935	6,985	7,001	9,428
Fine Gael	John Butterfield	7.6	4,081	4,097	4,731	4,808	4,825	4,830	4,836	
Fine Gael	Charles McDonald	7.3	3,930	4,041	4,222	5,230	5,399	5,453	5,461	6,009
Fianna Fáil	Jeremiah Lodge	6.2	3,346	3,406	3,441	3,683				
Fine Gael	Thomas Keenan	4.8	2,600	2,754	2,889					
Labour	Gerry McGuire	3.0	1,637	2,018						
Labour	Larry Kavanagh	1.8	971							
Independent	Joe McCormack	0.2	124							
Electorate: 70,417 Valid: 53,816 Quota: 8,970 Turnout: 76.4%

=== 1981 general election ===
1981 general election: Laoighis–Offaly
Party	Candidate	FPv%	Count						
Party	Candidate	FPv%	1	2	3	4	5	6	7
Fine Gael	Oliver J. Flanagan	16.4	9,177	9,226	9,699				
Fianna Fáil	Liam Hyland	16.0	8,952	8,972	9,035	11,416			
Fianna Fáil	Ger Connolly	15.1	8,467	8,503	8,829	9,403			
Fianna Fáil	Bernard Cowen	12.3	6,892	6,919	7,084	7,310	9,085	9,118	9,803
Fine Gael	Tom Enright	11.4	6,409	6,438	6,668	6,816	6,927	7,029	10,477
Fine Gael	Charles McDonald	9.0	5,010	5,049	5,361	5,662	5,839	5,912	7,005
Fine Gael	John Butterfield	8.4	4,691	4,722	5,445	5,465	5,484	5,641	
Fianna Fáil	Jeremiah Lodge	6.5	3,618	3,691	3,751				
Labour	Gerry McGuire	4.3	2,394	2,431					
Independent	Joe McCormack	0.4	201						
Independent	Francis Dunne	0.3	191						
Electorate: 70,417 Valid: 56,002 Quota: 9,334 Turnout: 79.5%

=== 1977 general election ===
1977 general election: Laoighis–Offaly
Party	Candidate	FPv%	Count								
Party	Candidate	FPv%	1	2	3	4	5	6	7	8	9
Fianna Fáil	Ger Connolly	14.2	7,432	7,474	7,788	7,823	7,859	7,862	8,867		
Fine Gael	Oliver J. Flanagan	14.1	7,415	7,549	7,811	8,316	8,919				
Fianna Fáil	Patrick Lalor	13.4	7,043	7,056	7,082	7,098	7,205	7,211	7,329	7,578	7,748
Fianna Fáil	Bernard Cowen	12.8	6,734	6,778	6,810	6,881	6,898	6,899	8,310	8,342	8,445
Fianna Fáil	Liam Hyland	10.6	5,550	5,571	5,597	5,610	5,814	5,821	5,949	6,291	6,563
Fine Gael	Tom Enright	10.2	5,338	5,468	5,569	6,108	6,549	6,625	7,484	11,178	
Independent	Jim Guinan	7.7	4,037	4,097	4,184	4,340	4,411	4,414			
Fine Gael	Charles McDonald	7.2	3,780	3,816	3,852	4,041	4,511	4,590	4,891		
Labour	James Kelly	3.2	1,654	2,008	2,050	2,094					
Fine Gael	Constance Hanniffy	2.8	1,473	1,558	1,587						
Independent	James Flanagan	2.0	1,035	1,076							
Labour	Benny Dowd	1.8	967								
Electorate: 65,252 Valid: 52,458 Quota: 8,744 Turnout: 80.4%

=== 1973 general election ===
1973 general election: Laoighis–Offaly
Party	Candidate	FPv%	Count										
Party	Candidate	FPv%	1	2	3	4	5	6	7	8	9	10	11
Fine Gael	Oliver J. Flanagan	18.3	8,205										
Fianna Fáil	Patrick Lalor	18.2	8,160										
Fine Gael	Tom Enright	11.2	5,020	5,217	5,227	5,322	5,344	5,417	5,670	5,968	6,834	8,986	
Fianna Fáil	Ger Connolly	10.8	4,829	4,851	4,984	5,027	5,335	5,387	5,536	6,365	6,489	6,767	6,797
Fianna Fáil	Bernard Cowen	9.8	4,384	4,397	4,491	4,690	4,953	4,969	5,082	6,465	6,520	6,727	6,768
Fine Gael	Charles McDonald	7.0	3,151	3,305	3,338	3,382	3,404	3,514	3,640	3,360	5,026	5,578	7,002
Fine Gael	Johnny Butterfield	5.9	2,643	2,746	2,748	2,872	2,883	2,935	3,591	3,614	3,785		
Fine Gael	Thomas Keenan	5.3	2,389	2,524	2,550	2,614	2,653	2,800	3,022	3,059			
Fianna Fáil	James Houlihan	5.1	2,274	2,289	2,469	2,498	2,724	2,738	2,754				
Labour	Laurence Byrne	2.8	1,253	1,285	1,287	1,393	1,401	1,889					
Labour	Henry Byrne	2.1	952	975	983	1,031	1,041						
Aontacht Éireann	Thomas Dolan	2.0	906	919	924								
Fianna Fáil	Thomas Culliton	1.7	748	760	941	973							
Electorate: 56,344 Valid: 44,914 Quota: 7,486 Turnout: 79.7%

=== 1969 general election ===
1969 general election: Laoighis–Offaly
Party	Candidate	FPv%	Count									
Party	Candidate	FPv%	1	2	3	4	5	6	7	8	9	10
Fine Gael	Oliver J. Flanagan	21.3	9,485									
Fianna Fáil	Patrick Lalor	19.5	8,659									
Fine Gael	Tom Enright	9.8	4,341	4,785	4,805	4,916	5,013	5,093	5,161	6,758	7,218	7,603
Fianna Fáil	Ger Connolly	8.1	3,616	3,671	3,850	3,884	3,892	4,112	4,630	4,656	4,788	5,720
Fianna Fáil	Bernard Cowen	8.0	3,550	3,584	3,661	3,673	3,707	3,730	4,256	4,652	4,753	6,874
Fine Gael	Charles McDonald	6.9	3,076	3,764	3,841	3,981	3,993	4,067	4,156	4,831	5,438	5,499
Fianna Fáil	James Houlihan	6.6	2,946	2,984	3,223	3,259	3,317	3,359	3,828	3,876	4,014	
Fine Gael	Frank Feery	5.7	2,519	3,006	3,011	3,056	3,113	3,281	3,317			
Labour	James Kelly	4.9	2,180	2,271	2,330	2,468	2,748	3,525	3,599	3,737		
Labour	James Flanagan	3.0	1,354	1,422	1,430	1,461	1,680					
Fianna Fáil	Thomas Culliton	3.0	1,322	1,383	1,933	1,976	1,986	2,011				
Labour	John Galvin	1.7	754	819	823	841						
Independent	Frank Powders	1.5	652	696	727							
Electorate: 56,066 Valid: 44,454 Quota: 7,410 Turnout: 79.3%

=== 1965 general election ===
1965 general election: Laoighis–Offaly
Party	Candidate	FPv%	Count			
Party	Candidate	FPv%	1	2	3	4
Fine Gael	Oliver J. Flanagan	28.0	12,204			
Fianna Fáil	Patrick Lalor	16.4	7,151	7,445		
Fianna Fáil	Kieran Egan	12.5	5,463	5,601	5,806	5,960
Fianna Fáil	Nicholas Egan	12.3	5,338	5,530	6,068	6,337
Labour	Henry Byrne	11.3	4,936	5,466	5,578	7,123
Fine Gael	Tom O'Higgins	11.0	4,775	7,277		
Fine Gael	Frank Feery	6.3	2,730	3,965	4,010	
Fianna Fáil	James Martin	2.2	962	1,015		
Electorate: 56,237 Valid: 43,559 Quota: 7,260 Turnout: 77.5%

=== 1961 general election ===
1961 general election: Laoighis–Offaly
Party	Candidate	FPv%	Count						
Party	Candidate	FPv%	1	2	3	4	5	6	7
Fine Gael	Oliver J. Flanagan	26.6	11,200						
Fianna Fáil	Nicholas Egan	12.5	5,255	5,454	5,570	5,716	5,724	6,166	6,548
Fianna Fáil	Kieran Egan	12.4	5,197	5,320	5,447	5,777	5,781	6,013	6,215
Fine Gael	Tom O'Higgins	11.8	4,943	7,197					
Fianna Fáil	Patrick Lalor	10.7	4,488	4,722	4,828	4,863	4,874	5,943	6,122
Labour	Henry Byrne	8.8	3,698	4,032	4,570	5,010	5,027	5,241	5,596
Fine Gael	Frank Feery	5.1	2,164	2,886	2,985	3,414	3,552	3,597	
Fianna Fáil	James Martin	4.8	2,022	2,114	2,213	2,242	2,250		
Labour	Bernard Corcoran	4.0	1,672	1,802	1,906				
Sinn Féin	John Behan	3.4	1,423	1,524					
Electorate: 56,568 Valid: 42,062 Quota: 7,011 Turnout: 74.4%

=== 1957 general election ===
1957 general election: Leix–Offaly
Party	Candidate	FPv%	Count						
Party	Candidate	FPv%	1	2	3	4	5	6	7
Fine Gael	Oliver J. Flanagan	21.8	9,747						
Fianna Fáil	Kieran Egan	17.6	7,881						
Fianna Fáil	Peadar Maher	15.2	6,776	6,955	6,975	7,009	8,185		
Fianna Fáil	Nicholas Egan	12.4	5,548	5,690	5,730	6,097	6,389	7,084	7,376
Fine Gael	Tom O'Higgins	12.3	5,486	6,811	7,210	7,216	7,287	7,300	8,250
Sinn Féin	Bhaltar Misteil	6.6	2,939	3,079	3,108	3,114	3,162	3,180	3,235
Labour	Bernard Corcoran	5.7	2,555	2,776	2,829	2,840	2,855	2,861	3,129
Fianna Fáil	James Martin	3.7	1,634	1,684	1,694	1,701			
Fine Gael	Frank Byrne	3.5	1,544	1,687	1,755	1,757	1,767	1,772	
Fine Gael	Michael Pettit	1.3	575	674					
Electorate: 58,833 Valid: 44,685 Quota: 7,448 Turnout: 76.0%

=== 1956 by-election ===
Labour Party TD William Davin died on 1 March 1956. A by-election was held to fill the vacancy on 30 April 1956.

1956 by-election: Leix–Offaly
Party	Candidate	FPv%	Count
Party	Candidate	FPv%	1
Fianna Fáil	Kieran Egan	55.5	23,565
Labour	Michael Davin	44.5	18,863
Electorate: 59,075 Valid: 42,428 Quota: 21,215 Turnout: 71.8%

=== 1954 general election ===
1954 general election: Leix–Offaly
Party	Candidate	FPv%	Count		
Party	Candidate	FPv%	1	2	3
Fine Gael	Oliver J. Flanagan	28.6	13,545		
Fianna Fáil	Peadar Maher	16.7	7,912		
Fianna Fáil	Nicholas Egan	15.3	7,273	7,510	7,692
Fine Gael	Tom O'Higgins	11.6	5,487	8,049	
Labour	William Davin	11.3	5,359	6,303	8,395
Fianna Fáil	Daniel Hogan	10.9	5,186	5,542	5,728
Fine Gael	Redmond Kerin	5.5	2,627	4,174	
Electorate: 59,950 Valid: 47,389 Quota: 7,899 Turnout: 79.1%

=== 1951 general election ===
1951 general election: Leix–Offaly
Party	Candidate	FPv%	Count							
Party	Candidate	FPv%	1	2	3	4	5	6	7	8
Independent	Oliver J. Flanagan	23.6	11,034							
Fine Gael	Tom O'Higgins	16.1	7,541	8,523						
Fianna Fáil	Patrick Boland	12.1	5,675	5,868	5,891	6,005	6,172	7,296	9,196	
Fianna Fáil	Peadar Maher	11.5	5,367	5,499	5,522	5,559	5,647	6,574	6,944	7,204
Labour	William Davin	8.3	3,882	4,955	5,198	5,573	6,913	7,084	7,333	7,415
Fianna Fáil	Daniel Hogan	7.6	3,534	3,655	3,674	3,749	3,851	4,528	5,648	6,708
Fianna Fáil	Nicholas Egan	7.3	3,404	3,516	3,532	3,763	3,853	4,159		
Fianna Fáil	Patrick Gorry	6.4	2,968	3,182	3,209	3,359	3,447			
Fine Gael	Redmond Kerin	4.6	2,127	2,400	2,756	2,904				
Independent	James Flanagan	2.6	1,229	1,369	1,391					
Electorate: 60,759 Valid: 46,761 Quota: 7,794 Turnout: 77.0%

=== 1948 general election ===
1948 general election: Leix–Offaly
Party	Candidate	FPv%	Count													
Party	Candidate	FPv%	1	2	3	4	5	6	7	8	9	10	11	12	13	14
Independent	Oliver J. Flanagan	30.3	14,369													
Fianna Fáil	Patrick Boland	15.6	7,366	7,883	7,932											
Fine Gael	Tom O'Higgins	11.5	5,458	6,677	6,750	6,752	6,797	6,905	6,962	7,738	7,887	8,002				
Fianna Fáil	Patrick Gorry	7.4	3,505	3,979	4,037	4,054	4,064	4,097	4,446	4,485	4,691	4,718	4,722	5,170	6,851	7,069
Fianna Fáil	Daniel Hogan	6.4	3,030	3,190	3,208	3,211	3,217	3,249	3,479	3,527	3,635	3,657	3,660	3,785	5,019	5,153
Fianna Fáil	Gerard Harkin	6.2	2,929	3,127	3,135	3,139	3,142	3,174	3,352	3,368	3,410	3,433	3,433	3,493		
Labour	William Davin	5.6	2,636	3,938	3,981	3,982	3,993	4,444	4,507	4,570	4,931	5,049	5,064	5,411	5,589	6,545
Independent	Edward J. Colton	4.0	1,899	2,143	2,166	2,169	2,190	2,232	2,297	2,338	2,392	2,430	2,443			
Independent	James J. Flanagan	2.4	1,141	1,398	1,410	1,410	1,425	1,460	1,484	1,512						
Fianna Fáil	James O'Connor	2.0	942	1,057	1,066	1,067	1,076	1,099								
Fine Gael	Patrick J. Doyle	1.9	916	1,086	1,097	1,099	1,108	1,119	1,132							
Clann na Poblachta	Tommy Murphy	1.9	903	1,752	1,807	1,808	2,012	2,099	2,123	2,136	2,249	3,222	3,250	3,519	3,602	
Clann na Poblachta	Cornelius Lehane	1.8	847	1,237	1,263	1,265	1,443	1,496	1,511	1,535	1,617					
Labour	Patrick Muldowney	1.4	683	948	981	981	1,021									
Clann na Poblachta	Matthew P. Moore	0.9	422	547	590	590										
Independent	William Henry Milner	0.7	327	515												
Electorate: 62,687 Valid: 47,373 Quota: 7,896 Turnout: 75.6%

=== 1944 general election ===
1944 general election: Leix–Offaly
Party	Candidate	FPv%	Count							
Party	Candidate	FPv%	1	2	3	4	5	6	7	8
Monetary Reform	Oliver J. Flanagan	22.0	9,856							
Fianna Fáil	Patrick Boland	17.4	7,831							
Fine Gael	Thomas F. O'Higgins	14.2	6,354	6,768	6,774	7,014	7,312	7,464	7,499	
Fianna Fáil	Patrick Gorry	9.9	4,439	4,744	4,844	4,852	4,936	5,230	6,579	7,149
Labour	William Davin	9.9	4,426	5,315	5,334	5,357	5,413	5,792	5,969	6,669
Fianna Fáil	George Connell	8.8	3,929	4,071	4,154	4,155	4,182	4,429	5,205	5,640
Clann na Talmhan	Patrick Bermingham	6.8	3,047	3,212	3,224	3,234	3,973	4,110	4,188	
Fianna Fáil	Michael Collier	4.7	2,100	2,191	2,294	2,304	2,351	2,598		
Independent	James Clarke	3.1	1,378	1,633	1,654	1,657	1,674			
Clann na Talmhan	Richard Hipwell	2.7	1,233	1,320	1,322	1,342				
Fine Gael	Patrick Kavanagh	0.7	305	329	330					
Electorate: 62,694 Valid: 44,898 Quota: 7,484 Turnout: 71.6%

=== 1943 general election ===
1943 general election: Leix–Offaly
Party	Candidate	FPv%	Count										
Party	Candidate	FPv%	1	2	3	4	5	6	7	8	9	10	11
Fianna Fáil	Patrick Boland	14.5	6,908	6,922	6,944	7,125	7,178	7,229	8,237				
Fine Gael	Thomas F. O'Higgins	13.6	6,479	7,006	8,037								
Labour	William Davin	12.0	5,727	5,803	5,831	6,578	8,368						
Monetary Reform	Oliver J. Flanagan	9.2	4,377	4,449	4,482	4,594	4,861	5,072	5,312	5,325	5,341	5,592	6,532
Fianna Fáil	Patrick Gorry	8.5	4,029	4,056	4,072	4,109	4,198	4,249	5,709	5,873	5,878	7,463	8,137
Clann na Talmhan	Patrick Bermingham	8.4	4,001	4,055	4,160	4,209	4,251	4,271	4,328	4,336	4,400	4,523	
Fianna Fáil	Daniel Hogan	7.4	3,527	3,542	3,568	3,590	3,616	3,649	3,792	3,824	3,830		
Fianna Fáil	George Connell	6.9	3,282	3,287	3,293	3,439	3,541	3,583	3,830	3,910	3,916	4,978	5,500
Fianna Fáil	Laurence Brady	6.8	3,260	3,293	3,302	3,330	3,392	3,412					
Labour	Edward Breen	4.2	2,005	2,020	2,027	2,510							
Labour	John Condron	3.7	1,780	1,783	1,860								
Fine Gael	Joseph Kearney	2.4	1,157	1,381									
Fine Gael	Charles Delaney	2.3	1,103										
Electorate: 62,694 Valid: 47,635 Quota: 7,940 Turnout: 76.0%

=== 1938 general election ===
1938 general election: Leix–Offaly
Party	Candidate	FPv%	Count				
Party	Candidate	FPv%	1	2	3	4	5
Fianna Fáil	Patrick Boland	17.3	8,440				
Fianna Fáil	Patrick Gorry	17.3	8,422				
Fine Gael	Thomas F. O'Higgins	17.0	8,315				
Labour	William Davin	12.7	6,190	6,232	6,255	8,105	8,605
Fianna Fáil	Daniel Hogan	11.8	5,778	5,817	5,917	5,973	8,619
Fine Gael	Jack Finlay	10.1	4,922	5,744	5,753	5,825	6,033
Fianna Fáil	Michael Collier	7.3	3,556	3,571	3,705	3,905	
Labour	Edward Breen	4.5	2,206	2,217	2,255		
Fine Gael	John McMahon	2.0	981				
Electorate: 60,858 Valid: 48,810 Quota: 8,136 Turnout: 80.2%

=== 1937 general election ===
1937 general election: Leix–Offaly
Party	Candidate	FPv%	Count					
Party	Candidate	FPv%	1	2	3	4	5	6
Labour	William Davin	17.5	8,317					
Fianna Fáil	Patrick Boland	15.9	7,571	7,590	7,990			
Fianna Fáil	Patrick Gorry	14.2	6,774	6,801	7,550	10,145		
Fine Gael	Thomas F. O'Higgins	12.9	6,122	6,132	6,395	6,439	6,461	7,700
Fine Gael	Jack Finlay	10.8	5,127	5,142	5,289	5,445	5,496	8,053
Fine Gael	Patrick Doyle	8.4	3,974	3,986	4,166	4,278	4,314	
Fianna Fáil	Daniel Hogan	8.0	3,795	3,803	3,994	4,293	6,069	6,241
Fianna Fáil	Laurence Brady	7.1	3,390	3,407	3,666			
Labour	Edward Breen	5.3	2,517	2,794				
Electorate: 60,945 Valid: 47,587 Quota: 7,932 Turnout: 78.1%

=== 1933 general election ===
1933 general election: Leix–Offaly
Party	Candidate	FPv%	Count					
Party	Candidate	FPv%	1	2	3	4	5	6
Fianna Fáil	Eamon Donnelly	16.5	8,326	8,359	8,365	8,421		
Cumann na nGaedheal	Thomas F. O'Higgins	15.2	7,640	9,383				
Labour	William Davin	14.1	7,120	7,208	7,228	7,446	7,643	8,321
Fianna Fáil	Patrick Boland	12.3	6,209	6,246	6,257	6,336	6,412	8,084
National Centre Party	Jack Finlay	11.5	5,784	6,270	6,502	9,335		
Fianna Fáil	Patrick Gorry	10.3	5,199	5,243	5,253	5,311	5,413	7,549
Fianna Fáil	Laurence Brady	9.1	4,563	4,575	4,576	4,607	4,615	
Cumann na nGaedheal	Patrick Doyle	5.6	2,808	3,084	3,788			
Cumann na nGaedheal	Eugene O'Brien	5.4	2,740					
Electorate: 60,364 Valid: 50,389 Quota: 8,399 Turnout: 83.5%

=== 1932 general election ===
1932 general election: Leix–Offaly
Party	Candidate	FPv%	Count							
Party	Candidate	FPv%	1	2	3	4	5	6	7	8
Fianna Fáil	Patrick Boland	17.3	8,082							
Labour	William Davin	14.3	6,687	7,016	8,801					
Fianna Fáil	Patrick Gorry	12.2	5,693	5,921	6,010	6,145	6,264	7,006	7,064	7,289
Cumann na nGaedheal	Thomas F. O'Higgins	10.3	4,811	5,030	5,055	5,126	6,204	6,251	6,254	7,455
Fianna Fáil	Eamon Donnelly	8.7	4,087	4,183	4,238	4,400	4,436	6,800	6,999	7,120
Cumann na nGaedheal	Patrick Doyle	8.2	3,820	3,865	3,916	3,995	4,738	4,928	4,938	
Cumann na nGaedheal	Eugene O'Brien	7.9	3,713	3,932	4,025	4,251	5,014	5,090	5,094	7,901
Fianna Fáil	James Bowles	7.4	3,448	3,516	3,627	3,904	3,973			
Cumann na nGaedheal	James Dwyer	5.8	2,711	2,938	2,973	3,016				
Labour	John Gill	4.8	2,240	2,274						
Farmers' Party	Daniel Kennedy	3.3	1,553							
Electorate: 59,774 Valid: 46,845 Quota: 7,808 Turnout: 78.4%

=== September 1927 general election ===
September 1927 general election: Leix–Offaly
Party	Candidate	FPv%	Count						
Party	Candidate	FPv%	1	2	3	4	5	6	7
Cumann na nGaedheal	William Aird	19.4	8,472						
Cumann na nGaedheal	James Dwyer	16.1	7,046	7,851					
Fianna Fáil	Patrick Boland	15.5	6,766	6,834	6,835	6,937	7,531		
Labour	William Davin	15.1	6,585	6,718	6,732	9,115			
Cumann na nGaedheal	Andrew Fay	9.3	4,067	4,223	4,764	4,856	5,217	5,230	5,302
Fianna Fáil	Patrick Gorry	9.0	3,914	3,925	3,932	4,165	4,556	4,742	8,314
Fianna Fáil	Thomas Tynan	8.8	3,840	3,854	3,859	3,946	4,308	4,364	
Labour	John Gill	6.8	2,962	2,971	2,978				
Electorate: 61,568 Valid: 43,652 Quota: 7,276 Turnout: 70.9%

=== June 1927 general election ===
June 1927 general election: Leix–Offaly
Party	Candidate	FPv%	Count						
Party	Candidate	FPv%	1	2	3	4	5	6	7
Labour	William Davin	23.1	9,973						
Fianna Fáil	Patrick Boland	14.1	6,095	6,147	6,182	6,232	6,323	7,009	7,162
Labour	John Gill	8.6	3,730	5,670	6,064	6,207	6,587	6,717	7,115
Cumann na nGaedheal	Patrick Egan	8.1	3,488	3,605	3,694	4,602	4,887	4,944	5,803
Cumann na nGaedheal	James Dwyer	7.9	3,411	3,662	3,777	5,132	5,650	5,712	7,408
Farmers' Party	William Cobbe	7.6	3,257	3,345	3,518	3,768	4,495	4,615	
Fianna Fáil	Thomas Tynan	7.5	3,240	3,305	3,354	3,374	3,764	5,946	6,155
Fianna Fáil	Patrick Gorry	7.3	3,162	3,206	3,261	3,299	3,519		
Cumann na nGaedheal	Francis Bulfin	6.6	2,838	2,909	2,976				
Independent	Richard Hipwell	6.6	2,835	2,937	2,998	3,048			
Independent	Michael Cahill	2.6	1,105	1,158					
Electorate: 61,568 Valid: 43,134 Quota: 7,190 Turnout: 70.1%

=== 1926 by-election ===
Republican TD Seán McGuinness was disqualified on 30 November 1925. A by-election was held to fill the vacancy on 18 February 1926.

1926 by-election: Leix–Offaly
Party	Candidate	FPv%	Count	
Party	Candidate	FPv%	1	2
Cumann na nGaedheal	James Dwyer	40.3	16,618	19,345
Republican	Art O'Connor	37.4	15,400	18,523
Labour	John Gill	22.3	9,187	
Electorate: 64,199 Valid: 41,205 Spoilt: 233 Quota: 20,603 Turnout: 64.2%

=== 1923 general election ===
1923 general election: Leix–Offaly
Party	Candidate	FPv%	Count										
Party	Candidate	FPv%	1	2	3	4	5	6	7	8	9	10	11
Labour	William Davin	15.7	6,323	6,405	6,428	6,471	6,563	6,698	6,898				
Cumann na nGaedheal	Francis Bulfin	14.1	5,689	5,763	5,777	5,950	6,140	6,553	6,972				
Republican	Seán McGuinness	13.8	5,572	5,606	5,850	5,897	6,023	6,048	6,092	6,094	6,098	6,198	6,811
Republican	Laurence Brady	11.8	4,751	4,762	5,059	5,074	5,170	5,181	5,292	5,296	5,303	5,619	5,745
Cumann na nGaedheal	Patrick Egan	9.0	3,630	3,711	3,724	3,884	3,978	4,643	4,955	5,100	5,117	5,806	6,860
Labour	Denis Cullen	6.7	2,717	2,843	2,850	2,862	2,898	2,958	2,972	2,974	3,007	3,162	
Farmers' Party	Daniel Kennedy	5.5	2,227	2,232	2,249	2,317	2,338	2,425					
National Democratic	Joseph Delaney	5.1	2,049	2,070	2,091	2,114	2,451	2,480	2,857	2,894	2,928		
Farmers' Party	Patrick Bermingham	5.0	1,996	2,018	2,028	2,642	3,033	3,072	3,788	3,850	3,879	4,235	4,330
National Democratic	Patrick Belton	3.6	1,445	1,457	1,462	1,490							
Cumann na nGaedheal	Seán Kelly	3.5	1,416	1,447	1,472	1,506	1,533						
Farmers' Party	Francis Doorley	3.1	1,248	1,257	1,267								
Republican	Patrick Gorry	1.7	697	708									
Independent	Andrew Byrne	1.4	557										
Electorate: 64,211 Valid: 40,317 Quota: 6,720 Turnout: 62.8%

=== 1922 general election ===
1922 general election: Leix–Offaly
Party	Candidate	FPv%	Count		
Party	Candidate	FPv%	1	2	3
Labour	William Davin	46.5	15,167		
Sinn Féin (Pro-Treaty)	Kevin O'Higgins	20.8	6,792		
Sinn Féin (Pro-Treaty)	Francis Bulfin	19.8	6,446	8,945	
Sinn Féin (Pro-Treaty)	Patrick McCartan	8.6	2,796	5,614	6,451
Sinn Féin (Pro-Treaty)	Joseph Lynch	4.3	1,391	4,722	5,779
Electorate: 46,031 Valid: 32,592 Quota: 6,519 Turnout: 70.8%

=== 1921 general election ===
1921 general election: Leix–Offaly (Note: Constituency named "King's County–Queen's County" in legislation) (uncontested)
Party	Candidate
Sinn Féin	Francis Bulfin
Sinn Féin	Joseph Lynch
Sinn Féin	Patrick McCartan
Sinn Féin	Kevin O'Higgins

== See also ==
- Dáil constituencies
- Politics of the Republic of Ireland
- Historic Dáil constituencies
- Elections in the Republic of Ireland
