= Darrell Figgis =

Irish politician and writer (1882–1925)

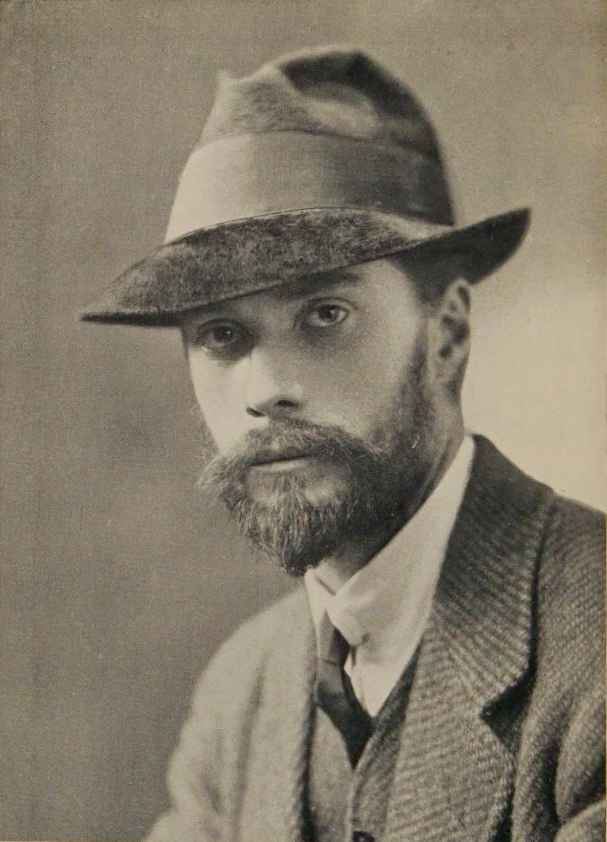
- Figgis in 1924

Teachta Dála
- In office June 1922 – 27 October 1925
- Constituency: Dublin County

Personal details
- Born: 17 September 1882 Rathmines, Dublin, Ireland
- Died: 27 October 1925 (aged 43) Finsbury, Islington, London, England
- Party: Sinn Féin; Independent
- Spouse: Millie Tate (1905–1924; her death)
- Occupation: Journalist; Politician; Businessman; Poet; Novelist; Playwright

Darrell Edmund Figgis (Irish: Darghal Figes; 17 September 1882 – 27 October 1925) was an Irish writer, Sinn Féin activist and independent parliamentarian in the Irish Free State.

== Early life ==
Darrell Figgis was born at Glen na Smoil, Palmerstown Park, Rathmines in Dublin, the son of Arthur William Figges, tea merchant, and Mary Anne Deane. While he was still an infant, his family emigrated to Calcutta. There his father worked as an agent in the tea business, founding A W Figgis & Co. They returned when Darrell was ten years of age, though his father continued to spend much of his time in India.

As a young man he worked in London at the tea brokerage owned by his uncle and it was at this time that he began to develop his interest in literature and literary criticism.

== Literary career ==
In 1910 Figgis, with the help of G. K. Chesterton, who wrote the introduction to his first book of verse, joined the Dent publishing company. For much of his time with Dent, Figgis resided at 42 Asmuns Hill, Hampstead Gardens in London. He moved to Pollagh, Achill Island, in 1913 to write, learn Irish and (like others of the Gaelic Revival) gain an appreciation of Irish culture, as perceived by many of his contemporaries to uniquely exist on the western seaboard. On his detention following the Easter Rising, he and the publishing house 'parted company'. Subsequently, he established his own firm in which he republished the works of William Carleton and others.

== Political life ==
=== Irish Volunteers and gun-running ===
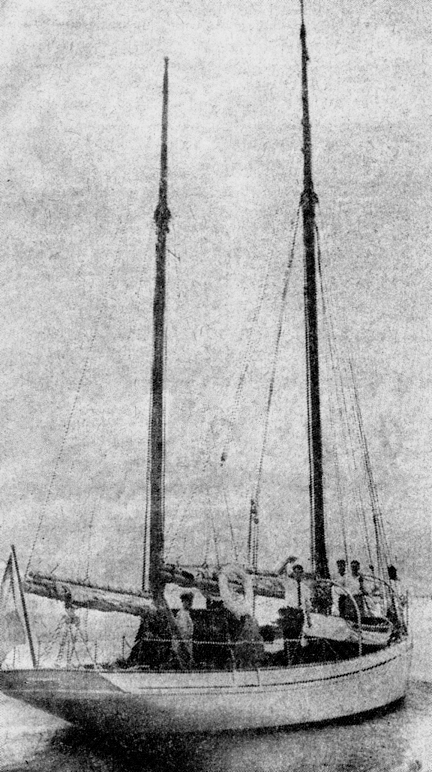
Asgard at sea, near Dublin.

Figgis joined the Irish Volunteers in Dublin in 1913 and organised the original Battalion of Volunteers in Achill, where he had built a house. While in London, he was contacted by The O'Rahilly, who acquainted him with the arms dealers who had supplied the Ulster Volunteers. In this way he became part of the London group that discussed the financing and supply of German rifles for the Volunteers. This group of gun-runners included Molly and Erskine Childers, Mary Spring Rice, Alice Stopford Green and Roger Casement. He travelled with Erskine Childers, initially to Belgium and from there to Germany to make the purchase of the army surplus Mauser rifles. Figgis then chartered the tug Gladiator, from which the arms were transferred at sea to Childers' yacht Asgard and Conor O'Brien's Kelpie. As well as the Childers and Spring Rice, Asgard was crewed by Captain Gordon Shephard of the Royal Flying Corps, and Patrick McGinley and Charles Duggan, two fishermen from Gola Island, County Donegal.

At this time the Royal Navy was patrolling the Irish Sea in anticipation of imminent war with Germany, and Figgis was tasked with taking a motor boat to Lambay Island to signal to the Asgard the all-clear. By his own account, he was unable to persuade the skipper of the pilot vessel to put to sea, as one of the worst storms in many years had been raging. Due to luck and the skill of the crews, the three over-laden yachts arrived at their destinations. Figgis, accompanied by Seán McGarry, watched Asgard helplessly from Howth pier until Erskine, with Molly at the helm, decided to take a calculated risk and sailed into the harbour. Against the odds, the conspiracy with Casement, Eoin MacNeill and Bulmer Hobson to buy rifles in Germany and land them safely in Ireland had succeeded. A large party of Volunteers, on their way to Dublin with rifles and ammunition was confronted by a detachment of the King's Own Scottish Borderers and Dublin Metropolitan Police. With their route blocked, Figgis and Thomas MacDonagh engaged the officers in an attempt to distract them. Figgis gave much of the credit for co-ordinating the quiet dispersal of the Volunteers with their contraband to "Commandant Kerrigan, a former soldier."

=== Internment and 1917 by-election ===
Although he did not participate in the 1916 Easter Rising, Figgis was arrested and interned by the British authorities between 1916 and 1917 in Reading Gaol. His wife Millie wrote to The New Age, detailing her husband's conditions in jail and what she saw as the excessively broad terms by which he was interned under the Defence of the Realm Act 1914. After his release, Figgis returned to Ireland. At the 1917 Sinn Féin Ardfheis he and Austin Stack were elected Honorary Secretaries of the party. The conference saw Éamon de Valera replace Arthur Griffith as President of the party. Griffith and Michael O'Flanagan became Vice-Presidents. Two Honorary Treasurers were also elected, W. T. Cosgrave and Laurence Ginnell. This duality of offices reflected the coalition nature of Sinn Féin between those of the constitutional tradition, and those who advocated a more militarist approach. Shortly after, Figgis was one of four recently released internees who travelled to campaign for Joseph McGuinness in the 1917 South Longford by-election caused by the death of John Phillips. The overwhelming victory of the Sinn Féin candidate over the Irish Parliamentary Party nominee marked the beginning of the eclipse of the latter party by the former party. In May 1918, Figgis was arrested for his alleged part in the spurious German Plot a second time and again deported to England. In 1918, he became editor of the newspaper The Republic.

=== Irish War of Independence (1919–1921) ===
From September 1919 to 1921 Figgis headed the Commission of Inquiry into the Resources and Industries of Ireland. At this time a serious rift between Figgis and Michael Collins, then Minister for Finance, became a matter of public record. This close attention of Collins would pursue Figgis in his later activities on the Constitution Committee.

While Figgis was participating in a Dáil Court at Carrick on Shannon, the proceedings were interrupted by a British Army raid. An officer named Captain Cyril Crawford summarily "condemned" Figgis and Peadar Kearney to be hanged. He ordered rope for the purpose, but another officer intervened and Keaney and Figgis were set free.

=== Truce ===
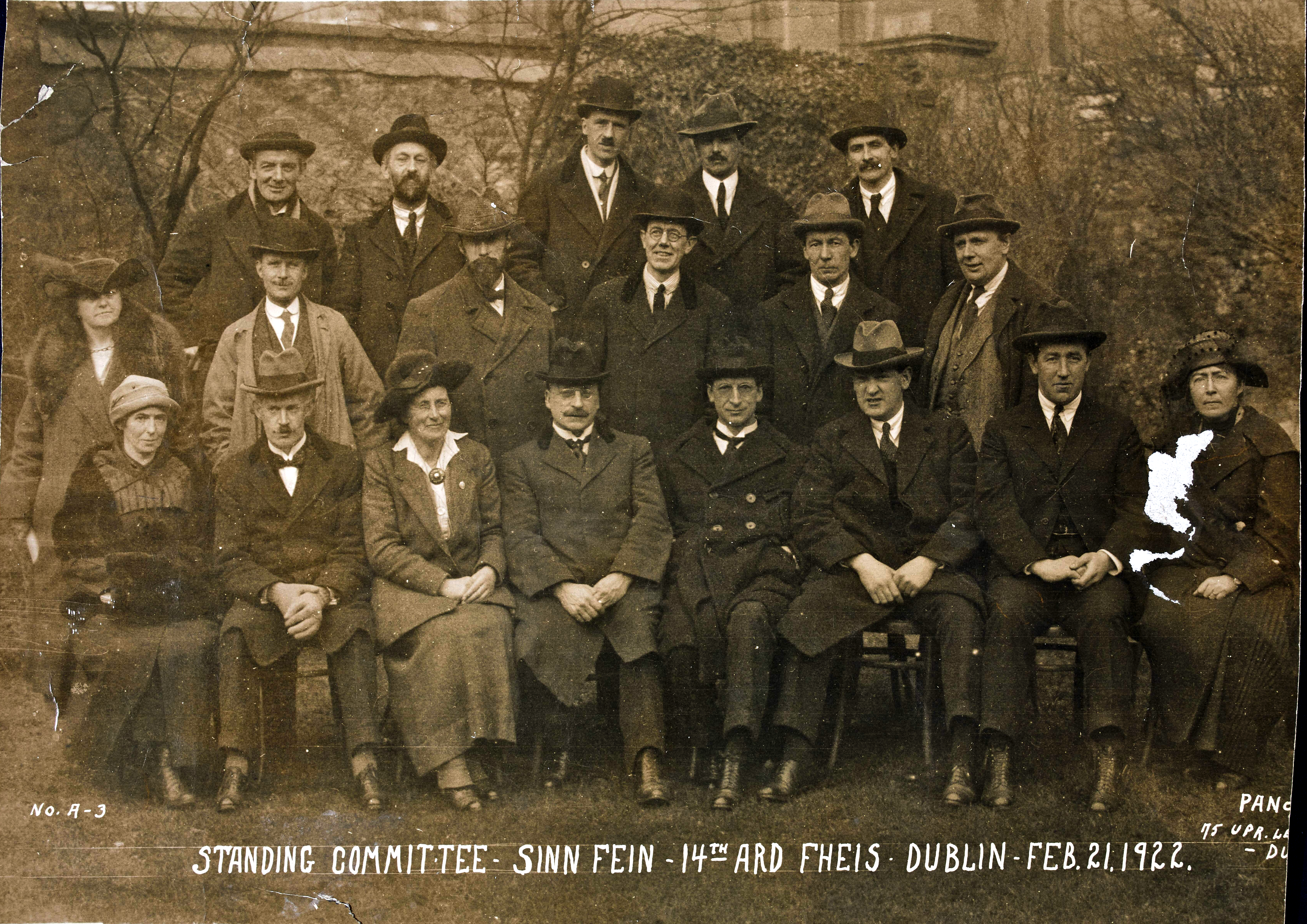
Figgis (second row, second from left) as a member of Sinn Féin's leadership in February 1922

Figgis supported the Anglo-Irish Treaty. He was extremely critical of the Collins/De Valera Pact for the June 1922 elections which was an attempt to avoid a split in the Sinn Féin party and, more importantly, in the IRA. On 25 May 1922 he attended a meeting of the executive council of the Farmers' Union and representatives of business interests, and encouraged them to put forward candidates in constituencies where anti-Treaty candidates might otherwise have headed the poll. As Figgis was a member of the Sinn Féin Ard Chomhairle National Executive at the time, he was expelled from the party. This contravention of policy must be assessed in the light of the flagrant breaches of the terms of the Truce that were a daily occurrence at the time. These were an unambiguous indication that the IRA was not under the control of Dáil Éireann and efforts at party unity were to a certain extent cosmetic.

=== Assault by Republicans ===
"Never a time went by without a bit of fun. Such an occasion was the degrading of Darrell Figgis...You should see him strolling down O'Connell Street in smartly cut clothes, with his red hair gleaming like newly polished boots, and a fine, red, square-cut beard that was his special pride. Now Figgis started making some very detrimental remarks about the IRA. We did not consider him a menace, he was too much the lightweight but he annoyed us with his waspish stings...Some of us held him tipped back on his swivel chair while one man produced a glittering razor. Figgis squealed like a pig ...I think he would have been happier had we just cut his throat."

— from Robert Briscoe's memoir, 1958.

On 11 June 1922, Darrell Figgis was assaulted and violently cut off his beard. The Evening Herald reported that shortly before midnight, Millie Figgis had answered a knock at the door. Three men rushed past her seeking out her husband. Mrs. Figgis, fearing that they intended to shoot him, pushed into the room and attempted to lock it but was prevented from doing so by the intruders. The paper went on to say that "Mrs. Figgis is suffering severely from shock". Details of the attack remained vague until one of those responsible broke his silence 36 years later.

This was future Lord Mayor of Dublin, Robert Briscoe, at the time of this disclosure the most prominent and respected politician from the Jewish community in Ireland. A less than sympathetic attitude to the attack was not confined to Anti-Treatyites. In a letter to Collins on 13 June, his fiancée Kitty Kiernan wrote the following:

"Poor Darrell Figgis lost his nice red beard. When I read about it I could imagine you laughing and enjoying it very much. But it was a mean thing for Harry's cronies to do, wasn't it? Funny, this ages I've been expecting that something might happen to Figgis (from reading papers). He was lucky it was only his beard."

=== Constitution Committee ===
The Constitution Committee meeting at the Shelbourne Hotel, Dublin; Figgis is seated fourth from the left.

Soon after the signing of the Treaty, the necessity of quickly drafting a constitution for the proposed Free State became apparent. It was intended by Arthur Griffith that Figgis would chair the Constitution Committee, but this proposal was vetoed by Collins who nominated himself for the position specifically to minimise Figgis's influence. The animosity between Collins and Figgis remained an undercurrent of the project and in Collins's absence after the inaugural gathering, James G. Douglas, a Collins nominee, kept him briefed of developments by detailed weekly meetings. Douglas, who in his memoirs admitted his dislike for Figgis, brought with him onto the committee James McNeill, Clement J. France and R.J.P Mortished who had worked closely with him at the Irish White Cross thus consolidating further Collins's control. The mutual animosity between Figgis and Douglas stemmed from the early days of the Irish White Cross. Darrell Figgis had sought nomination as its Secretary. Douglas backed McNeill. In the end, Collins decided the job should go to Captain David Robinson, but this did nothing to heal the Figgis-Douglas rift.

=== Elections ===
In the 1922 and 1923 general elections he was elected as an independent Teachta Dála (member of parliament) for Dublin County.

While still a TD, he stood in the 1925 election to Seanad Éireann, where he polled only 512 first preferences.

=== Wireless Broadcasting Enquiry ===
In December 1923, it was decided that a committee be established to investigate the means by which a public radio broadcasting service should be operated in the Free State. A central issue of contention was whether the service should be run and controlled directly by the State or operated commercially by an Irish Broadcasting Company. The latter option, it was suggested, would follow the model adopted in the UK by the establishment of the BBC. Figgis was co-opted onto the committee, and this decision led to a series of allegations resulting in the new State's first corruption scandal of which Figgis himself was the focus.

A former business associate of Figgis, Andrew Belton, sent a letter to J. J. Walsh the Postmaster General. Walsh's own preferences for a private syndicate, which would include Belton and business acquaintances from Cork, together with his personal animosity towards Figgis, were evident from the outset. In the letter leaked by Walsh, Belton stated that Figgis had promised to use his political influence to assist him to gain government contracts. The accusation resulted in Figgis resigning from the Broadcasting committee and a second enquiry being launched to investigate these new allegations.

Figgis strenuously denied any impropriety, claiming they were motivated by personal animosity when Belton's expectations of preferential treatment were unfulfilled. Belton's apparent connections with senior finance and political figures in London, including Lord Beaverbrook, were also matters of considerable disquiet.

== Personal life and suicide ==
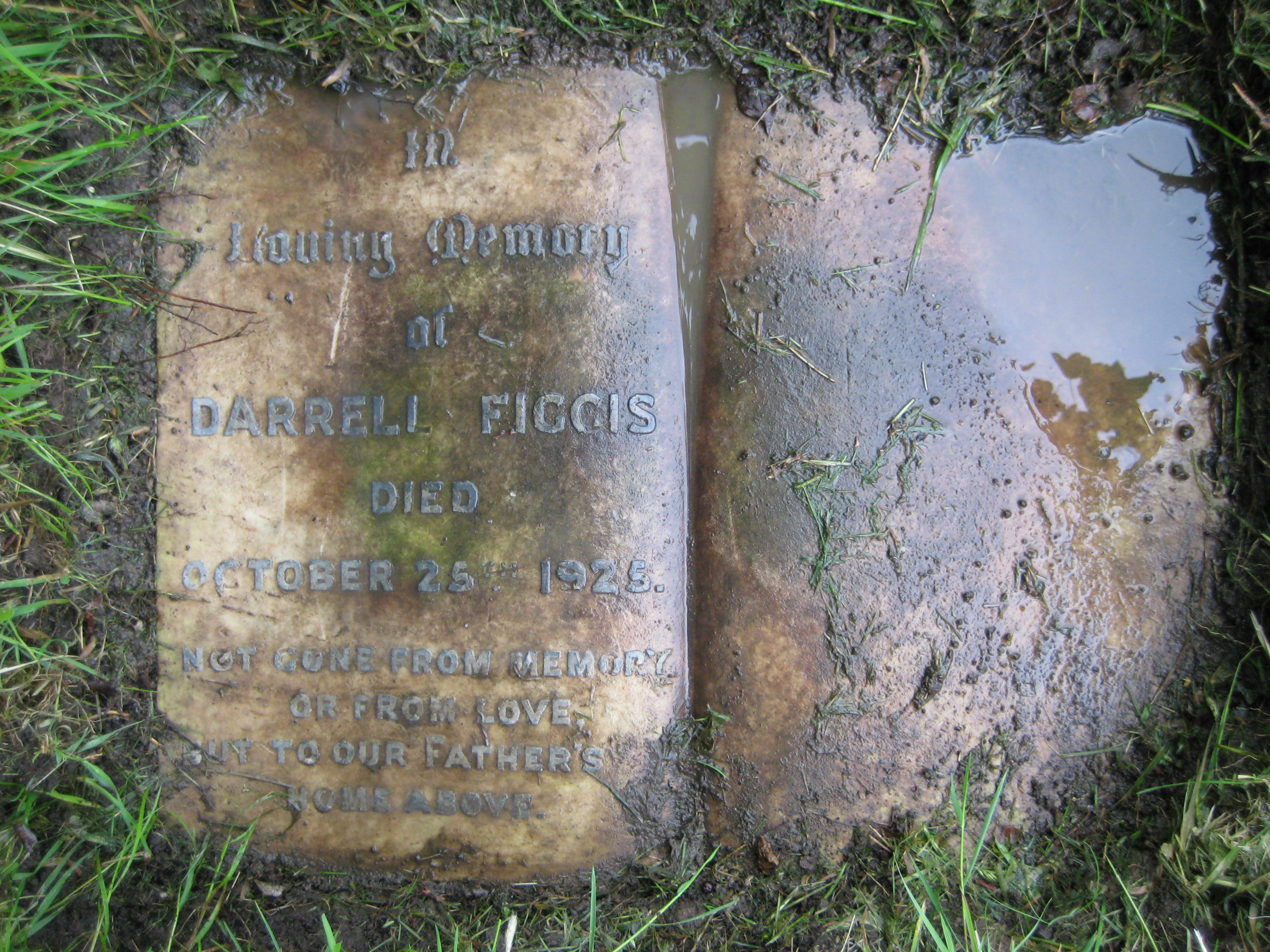
Figgis's headstone – rediscovered May 2008. Date of death mistakenly given as 25 October. (Located at No. 35, Section J 8)

On 18 November 1924, Figgis's wife Millie committed suicide using a Webley revolver given to them by Collins following the 1922 assault. According to the inquest, she shot herself in the head in the back of a taxi in Rathfarnham, having previously ordered the driver to take her to the Hellfire Club. Two bullets in the gun were discharged. She was taken to the Meath Hospital and pronounced dead. A bloodstained suicide letter was handed by the Matron to Figgis when he arrived there. In her letter, she expressed her sorrow for the pain her action would cause to her husband and referred to injuries and depression arising from the 1922 attack. She was buried at Mount Jerome Cemetery, Dublin.

A year later, Figgis's new love, a 21-year-old Catholic woman named Rita North, died due to medical difficulties, when Dr Lake tried to surgically remove an already dead child. The court, after investigating North's death, determined that she died, "due to peritonitis" - and inflammation in the lining of the abdominal cavity. However, many suspected that she died in a failed illegal abortion. Her body was brought back from London and she was buried by her family at Glasnevin Cemetery.

Figgis himself committed suicide in a London boarding-house, in Granville Street, Finsbury, on 27 October 1925, just a week after giving evidence at North's inquest and only weeks after his unsuccessful attempt to take a Seanad seat. He had been staying at the Royal Automobile Club until the day before his death, as was usual when he visited London. A small group of mourners comprising close family and friends attended his interment at the West Hampstead Cemetery.

The by-election caused by his death was won by William Norton of the Labour Party.

== Documents ==
Dublin Castle Records for Darrell Figgis

Military intelligence file for Darrell Figgis

== Works ==
- A Vision of Life (1909) poems (Gutenberg)
- Shakespeare: A Study (1911)
- The Crucibles of Time (1911) poems
- Studies and Appreciations (1912)
- Broken Arcs (1912) novel
- Queen Tara (1913) play
- Jacob Elthorne (1914) novel as Michael Ireland
- The Mount of Transfiguration (1915) poems
- AE (George W. Russell). A Study of a Man and a Nation (1916)
- The Gaelic State in the Past & Future, or, "The Crown of a Nation" (1917) (Gutenberg)
- A Chronicle of Jails (1917) (Gutenberg)
- Bye-Ways of Study (1918) essays
- Children of Earth (1918) novel as Michael Ireland
- The Historic Case for Irish Independence (1918)
- Carleton's Stories of Irish Life (1918/9) by William Carleton, editor
- A Second Chronicle of Jails (1919)
- Bogach Bán (1922) poem
- The Economic Case for Irish Independence (1920)
- Planning for the Future (1922) address to the Architectural Association of Ireland
- The House of Success (1922) novel as Michael Ireland
- The Irish Constitution Explained (Dublin: Mellifont Press, 1922 (Gutenberg)
- The Return of the Hero (1923) novel, as Michael Ireland
- The Paintings of William Blake (1925)
- John Milton and Darrell Figgis [editor]
- Comus: A Mask with Eight Illustrations By William Blake (1926) John Milton, editor
- Recollections of the Irish War (1927)

== Notes ==
=== Bibliography ===
- Wessel-Felter, M (1993). "Darrell Figgis- An Overview of his Work". Journal of Irish Literature. 22 (2). 0047-2514.
- Dunn, John J. (January 1986). "A Man Nearly Anonymous". Journal of Irish Literature. 15 (1). 0047-2514.
- Dunn, John J. (May–September 1973). "In Memory of Darrell Figgis- A Poem". Journal of Irish Literature. 0047-2514.
- Savage, Robert J. (1996). Irish Television: The Political and Social Origins. Greenwood Publishing Group. ISBN 978-0-275-95457-4.
- Kuhn, Raymond (1985). Broadcasting and Politics in Western Europe. Routledge. ISBN 978-0-7146-3274-2.
- Briscoe, Robert & Alden R. Hatch: For the Life of Me: Little and Brown: Boston (1958)
- Colum, Mary Maguire: Life and the Dream: Dolmen Press: Dublin (1966)
- Douglas, James Green & Anthony J.Gaughan, (ed.): Memoirs of James G. Douglas- Concerned Citizen; ISBN 1-900621-19-3.
- Hogan, Robert & Richard Burnham: The Years of O'Casey, 1921-1926- A Documentary History; ISBN 0-85105-428-5
- McInerney, Michael: The Riddle of Erskine Childers (Dublin 1971)
- Ó Broin, León (ed) In Great Haste: The Letters of Michael Collins and Kitty Kiernan; ISBN 978-0-7171-2398-8.
- Pine, Richard; 2RN and the Origins of Irish Radio; ISBN 978-1-85182-604-9.
- "Figgis, Darrell" . Thom's Irish Who's Who . Dublin: Alexander Thom and Son Ltd. 1923. p. 80 – via Wikisource.

Dáil	Election	Deputy (Party)	Deputy (Party)	Deputy (Party)	Deputy (Party)	Deputy (Party)	Deputy (Party)	Deputy (Party)	Deputy (Party)
2nd	1921	Michael Derham (SF)	George Gavan Duffy (SF)	Séamus Dwyer (SF)	Desmond FitzGerald (SF)	Frank Lawless (SF)	Margaret Pearse (SF)	6 seats 1921–1923	
3rd	1922	Michael Derham (PT-SF)	George Gavan Duffy (PT-SF)	Thomas Johnson (Lab)	Desmond FitzGerald (PT-SF)	Darrell Figgis (Ind)	John Rooney (FP)	6 seats 1921–1923	
4th	1923	Michael Derham (CnaG)	Bryan Cooper (Ind)	Thomas Johnson (Lab)	Desmond FitzGerald (CnaG)	Darrell Figgis (Ind)	John Good (Ind)	Kathleen Lynn (Rep)	Kevin O'Higgins (CnaG)
4th	1924 by-election	Batt O'Connor (CnaG)	Bryan Cooper (Ind)	Thomas Johnson (Lab)	Desmond FitzGerald (CnaG)	Darrell Figgis (Ind)	John Good (Ind)	Kathleen Lynn (Rep)	Kevin O'Higgins (CnaG)
4th	1926 by-election	Batt O'Connor (CnaG)	Bryan Cooper (Ind)	Thomas Johnson (Lab)	Desmond FitzGerald (CnaG)	William Norton (Lab)	John Good (Ind)	Kathleen Lynn (Rep)	Kevin O'Higgins (CnaG)
5th	1927 (Jun)	Batt O'Connor (CnaG)	Bryan Cooper (Ind)	Thomas Johnson (Lab)	Desmond FitzGerald (CnaG)	Patrick Belton (FF)	John Good (Ind)	Seán MacEntee (FF)	Kevin O'Higgins (CnaG)
5th	1927 by-election	Batt O'Connor (CnaG)	Bryan Cooper (Ind)	Thomas Johnson (Lab)	Desmond FitzGerald (CnaG)	Patrick Belton (FF)	John Good (Ind)	Seán MacEntee (FF)	Gearóid O'Sullivan (CnaG)
6th	1927 (Sep)	Batt O'Connor (CnaG)	Bryan Cooper (CnaG)	Joseph Murphy (Ind)	Desmond FitzGerald (CnaG)	Seán Brady (FF)	John Good (Ind)	Seán MacEntee (FF)	Gearóid O'Sullivan (CnaG)
6th	1930 by-election	Batt O'Connor (CnaG)	Thomas Finlay (CnaG)	Joseph Murphy (Ind)	Desmond FitzGerald (CnaG)	Seán Brady (FF)	John Good (Ind)	Seán MacEntee (FF)	Gearóid O'Sullivan (CnaG)
7th	1932	Batt O'Connor (CnaG)	Thomas Finlay (CnaG)	Patrick Curran (Lab)	Henry Dockrell (CnaG)	Seán Brady (FF)	John Good (Ind)	Seán MacEntee (FF)	Gearóid O'Sullivan (CnaG)
8th	1933	Batt O'Connor (CnaG)	John A. Costello (CnaG)	Margaret Mary Pearse (FF)	Henry Dockrell (CnaG)	Seán Brady (FF)	John Good (Ind)	Seán MacEntee (FF)	Gearóid O'Sullivan (CnaG)
8th	1935 by-election	Cecil Lavery (FG)	John A. Costello (CnaG)	Margaret Mary Pearse (FF)	Henry Dockrell (CnaG)	Seán Brady (FF)	John Good (Ind)	Seán MacEntee (FF)	Gearóid O'Sullivan (CnaG)
9th	1937	Cecil Lavery (FG)	Henry Dockrell (FG)	Gerrard McGowan (Lab)	Patrick Fogarty (FF)	Seán Brady (FF)	5 seats 1937–1948		
10th	1938	Patrick Belton (FG)	Henry Dockrell (FG)	Thomas Mullen (FF)	Patrick Fogarty (FF)	Seán Brady (FF)	5 seats 1937–1948		
11th	1943	Liam Cosgrave (FG)	Henry Dockrell (FG)	James Tunney (Lab)	Patrick Fogarty (FF)	Seán Brady (FF)	5 seats 1937–1948		
12th	1944	Liam Cosgrave (FG)	Henry Dockrell (FG)	Patrick Burke (FF)	Patrick Fogarty (FF)	Seán Brady (FF)	5 seats 1937–1948		
12th	1947 by-election	Liam Cosgrave (FG)	Henry Dockrell (FG)	Patrick Burke (FF)	Seán MacBride (CnaP)	Seán Brady (FF)	5 seats 1937–1948		
13th	1948	Éamon Rooney (FG)	Seán Dunne (Lab)	Patrick Burke (FF)	3 seats 1948–1961				
14th	1951	Éamon Rooney (FG)	Seán Dunne (Lab)	Patrick Burke (FF)	3 seats 1948–1961				
15th	1954	Éamon Rooney (FG)	Seán Dunne (Lab)	Patrick Burke (FF)	3 seats 1948–1961				
16th	1957	Éamon Rooney (FG)	Kevin Boland (FF)	Patrick Burke (FF)	3 seats 1948–1961				
17th	1961	Éamon Rooney (FG)	Kevin Boland (FF)	Patrick Burke (FF)	Mark Clinton (FG)	Seán Dunne (Ind)	5 seats 1961–1969		
18th	1965	Des Foley (FF)	Kevin Boland (FF)	Patrick Burke (FF)	Mark Clinton (FG)	Seán Dunne (Lab)	5 seats 1961–1969		
19th	1969	Constituency abolished. See Dublin County North and Dublin County South							
