= 1926 Leix–Offaly by-election =

By-election to the 4th Dáil

- 18 February 1926
- Turnout: 41,438 (64.5%)
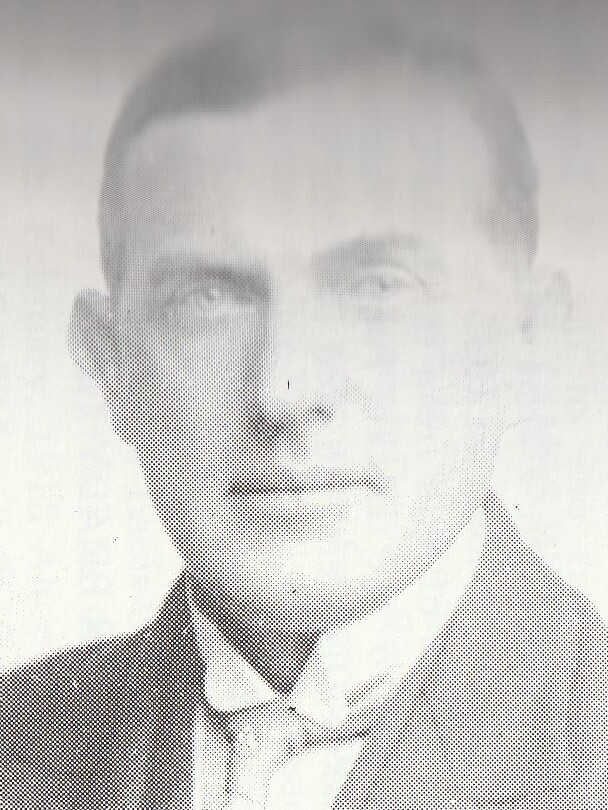

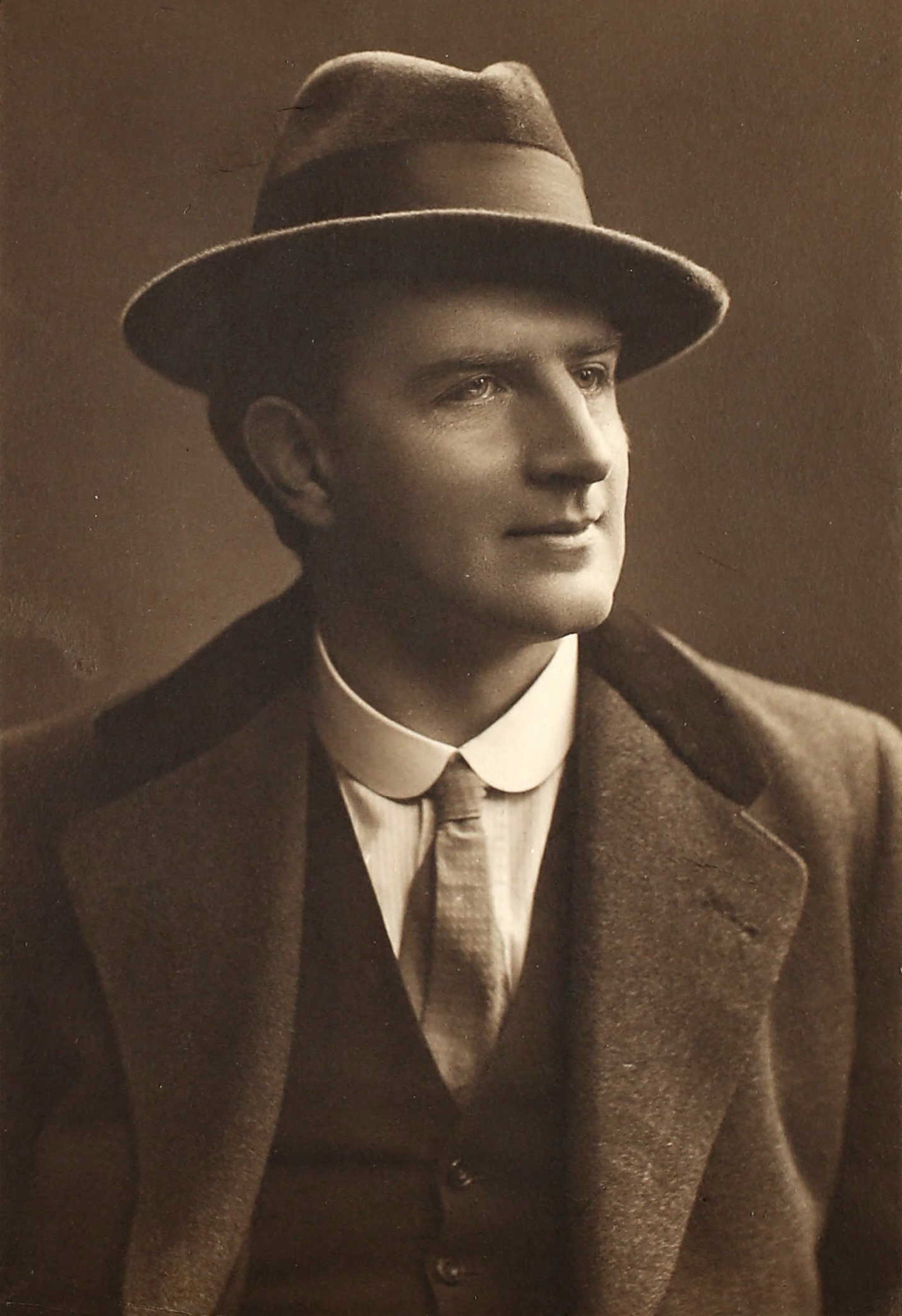
| | | | Gill |
| Nominee | James Dwyer | Art O'Connor | John Gill |
| Party | Cumann na nGaedheal | Republican | Labour |
| First preferences | 16,618 | 15,400 | 9,187 |
| Percentage | 40.3% | 37.4% | 22.3% |
| Final count | 19,345 | 18,523 | – |
TD before election
Seán McGuinness
Republican
TD after election
James Dwyer
Cumann na nGaedheal

A Dáil by-election was held in the constituency of Leix–Offaly in the Irish Free State on Thursday, 18 February 1926, to fill a vacancy in the 4th Dáil. Leix–Offaly was a five seat constituency comprising the counties of County Leix and County Offaly.

Seán McGuinness was a veteran of the War of Independence who took the Anti-Treaty side in the Civil War. He was elected as a Republican TD for Leix–Offaly at the 1923 general election. He was charged with two counts of assault in April 1924. On 29 October 1925, he was sentenced to a term of eighteen months' imprisonment. As his sentence was for more than six months, he was disqualified from the Oireachtas under section 51 of the Electoral Act 1923, taking effect 30 days after the imposition of the sentence.

On 27 January 1926, the Dáil directed the Clerk to issue the writ of election to fill the vacancy. James Dwyer contested for Cumann na nGaedheal. Art O'Connor, a TD from 1918 to 1922, contested as a Republican candidate. John Gill contested for the Labour Party.

== Result ==
The by-election was held on 18 February 1926, the same day as the 1926 Dublin County by-election. The seat was won by James Dwyer.

1926 Leix–Offaly by-election
| Party | Candidate | FPv% | Count | |
| Party | Candidate | FPv% | 1 | 2 |
|---|---|---|---|---|
| Cumann na nGaedheal | James Dwyer | 40.3 | 16,618 | 19,345 |
| Republican | Art O'Connor | 37.4 | 15,400 | 18,523 |
| Labour | John Gill | 22.3 | 9,187 | |
Electorate: 64,199 Valid: 41,205 Spoilt: 233 Quota: 20,603 Turnout: 64.5%

Dwyer took his seat in Dáil Éireann on 24 February, after taking the Oath of Allegiance required under Article 17 of the Constitution of the Irish Free State.

The third-place candidate, John Gill, was elected for Leix–Offaly at the June 1927 general election, but was defeated at the September 1927 general election.
