= 1926 Dublin County by-election =

By-election to the 4th Dáil

- 18 February 1926
- Turnout: 33,050 (33.7%)

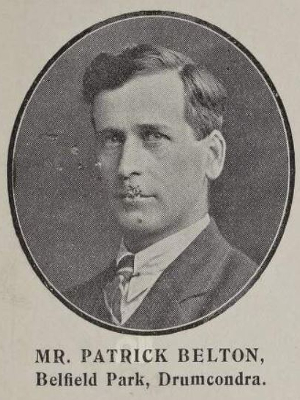
		Healy
Nominee	William Norton	Thomas Healy	Patrick Belton
Party	Labour	Cumann na nGaedheal	Independent
First preferences	11,797	12,279	8,974
Percentage	35.7%	37.2%	27.2%
Final count	15,168	14,303	–
TD before election
Darrell Figgis
Independent
TD after election
William Norton
Labour

A Dáil by-election was held in the constituency of Dublin County in the Irish Free State on Thursday, 18 February 1926, to fill a vacancy in the 4th Dáil. Dublin County was an eight seat constituency comprising the administrative county of County Dublin.

Darrell Figgis was a journalist and nationalist activist who had taken part in the 1914 Howth gun-running, was a judge in the Dáil Courts and was vice-chairman of the Committee that drafted the Constitution of the Irish Free State. He was elected as an independent TD for Dublin County at the 1922 general election and the 1923 general election. On 27 October 1925, he killed himself while staying in London.

On 27 January 1926, the Dáil directed the Clerk to issue the writ of election to fill the vacancy. Thomas Healy contested for Cumann na nGaedheal. William Norton, an officer in the Post Office Workers' Union, contested for the Labour Party. Patrick Belton, who had taken part in the Easter Rising and had contested the 1923 general election in Leix–Offaly for the National Democratic Party, contested this by-election as an independent candidate. It was held on the same day as the 1926 Leix–Offaly by-election.

== Result ==
The by-election was held on 18 February 1926. The seat was won by William Norton. It was first by-election in Ireland won by the Labour Party; it did not gain a seat again at a by-election until the 1976 Dublin South-West by-election.

1926 Dublin County by-election
Party	Candidate	FPv%	Count	
Party	Candidate	FPv%	1	2
Cumann na nGaedheal	Thomas Healy	37.2	12,279	14,303
Labour	William Norton	35.7	11,797	15,168
Independent	Patrick Belton	27.2	8,974	
Electorate: 98,187 Valid: 33,050 Quota: 16,526 Turnout: 33.7%

Norton took his seat in Dáil Éireann on 26 March, after taking the Oath of Allegiance required under Article 17 of the Constitution of the Irish Free State. He later served as leader of the Labour Party (1932–1960) and Tánaiste (1948–1951, 1954–1957).

The third-place candidate, Patrick Belton, was elected at the June 1927 general election for Fianna Fáil. He split with the party when he took his seat in the 5th Dáil on 26 July before a change in party policy. He later joined Cumann na nGaedheal, spending various periods as a member of that party (and its successor Fine Gael) and again as an independent.
