= Communication Workers Union (Ireland) =

Trade union

- Founded: 1922
- Headquarters: Dublin, Ireland
- Location: Ireland
- Members: 19,550
- Key people: Seán McDonagh, General Secretary
- Affiliations: ICTU
- Website: www.cwu.ie

The Communication Workers Union is a trade union in Ireland.

The union was founded in 1922 as the Irish Post Office Engineering Union, splitting from the British Post Office Engineering Union following the establishment of the Irish Free State. The following year, it merged with the Irish Postal Union and the Irish Postal Workers' Union, forming the United Postal Union, but the IPOEU was unhappy with the arrangements, and so withdrew before the merger was completed, continuing an independent existence.

It was renamed the Communications Union of Ireland in 1985, while in 1989, it was joined by the Postal Telecommunications Workers' Union and adopted its current name.

== General Secretaries ==
1945: Francis Walsh
1946: Seán Mac Bhárd
1949: Malachy Dooney
1967: Seamus De Paor
1990: David Begg
1997: Con Scanlon
2004: Steve Fitzpatrick
2022: Seán McDonagh
