= Workplace Relations Commission =

Adjudication body in Ireland

- An Coimisiún um Chaidreamh san Áit Oibre

State Agency of the Department of Enterprise, Tourism and Employment overview
- Formed: 1 October 2015
- Preceding agencies: Labour Relations Commission; Employment Appeals Tribunal; National Employment Rights Authority
- Jurisdiction: Ireland
- Headquarters: O'Brien Road, Carlow, R93 E920
- Employees: 246 (2021)
- Annual budget: €15.170m (2021)
- State Agency of the Department of Enterprise, Tourism and Employment executives: Audrey Cahill, Director General; Dr David Begg, Chair
- Parent department: Department of Enterprise, Tourism and Employment
- Website: https://www.workplacerelations.ie/

The Workplace Relations Commission (also known as its abbreviation, the WRC and sometimes referred to as the Commission; Irish: An Coimisiún um Chaidreamh san Áit Oibre) is the independent State agency responsible for industrial relations in Ireland, established under the Workplace Relations Act 2015.

Upon its formation, it replaced, and took over all the functions of the Labour Relations Commission, Employment Appeals Tribunal and the National Employment Rights Authority.

== History ==
Before the formation of the Workplace Relations Commission in 2015, there were several organisations that were responsible for industrial relations in the State, including the Labour Relations Commission, Employment Appeals Tribunal and the National Employment Rights Authority.

These different organisations caused confusion amongst employees and employers, as it was unclear what organisation was the correct one to raise certain issues with. This led to the then-Minister for Jobs, Enterprise and Innovation Richard Bruton submitting a proposal to the Oireachtas Committee on Jobs, Enterprise and Innovation in July 2012 that a new Workplace Relations Commission be formed.

Two years later in July 2014, the Workplace Relations Act 2015 was presented to the Oireachtas (the Irish Parliament), and was signed into law by the President in May 2015. In July 2015, in a Statutory Order, the Minister set 1 October 2015 as the date that the Workplace Relations Act would be commenced (i.e. when the new Workplace Relations Commission would form and the preceding agencies would dissolve).

== Services provided by the Workplace Relations Commission ==
The Workplace Relations Commission's primary and most-known service is their complaints service, where employees can present complaints in relation to contraventions of, and disputes as to entitlements under employment, equality and equal status legislation to the Director General of the Workplace Relations Commission. It also provides alternative dispute relation services including conciliation and mediation.

The WRC's Information and Customer Service Division provides advice and guidance to employees and employers on employment law rights, equality rights and industrial relations. New regulations in 2024 introduced on-the-spot fines for breaches in employment laws, pertaining to redundancies, contracts, and distribution of tips and gratuities.

The WRC also conducts inspections of workplaces and ensures employers compliance with employment law. The WRC advises the Minister for Enterprise, Trade and Employment about the application of, and compliance with, relevant employment legislation.
