= Maurice Cosgrave =

- Born: 7 March 1922
- Died: 1 September 1996 (aged 74)
- Occupation: Trade union leader

Maurice Cosgrave (7 March 1922 – 1 September 1996) was an Irish trade union leader.

Cosgrave worked at the Curragh Camp during World War II. He became active in the Post Office Workers' Union, and in 1966 was elected as its general secretary. He represented the union at the Irish Congress of Trade Unions (ICTU), and was President of the ICTU in 1970–1971. In this role, he developed new policies on secondary picketing and prioritised agreeing minimum wages in industries where there had not previously been one in force.

Cosgrave stood down as leader of the union in 1973, and became active in the Labour Court, serving as its chair from 1977 until 1984. In 1985, he was appointed to the Electricity Supply Board Industrial Council, serving for three years, during which time he was involved in creating a single civil service pension scheme.

Trade union offices
Preceded by William Bell	General Secretary of the Post Office Workers' Union; 1966–1973	Succeeded by Terry Quinlan
Preceded by James Morrow	President of the Irish Congress of Trade Unions; 1970–1971	Succeeded by Jim Cox
