= David Begg (trade unionist) =

Irish trade union leader, later charity CEO

- Born: 7 March 1950 (age 76); Dublin, Ireland
- Occupations: Trade Union Leader (retired) and NGO CEO
- Known for: General Secretary of the Irish Congress of Trade Unions, later CEO of Concern Worldwide (development charity)
- Predecessor: Peter Cassells (ICTU)

David Begg (born 7 March 1950) is a former General Secretary of the main Irish organised labour body, the Irish Congress of Trade Unions, between 2001 and 2015, and later CEO of major development charity Concern Worldwide. In 2021, he was appointed as chairperson of the Workplace Relations Commission for five years by Damien English.

He has also been a director of Ireland's Central Bank (1995–2010), a governor of the Irish Times Trust (2001–2011), a non-executive director of Aer Lingus, a member of the National Economic and Social Council (NESC), and of the Advisory Board of Development Co-operation Ireland. Begg is also Chairperson of the Irish Pensions Authority and is listed as an adjunct professor at Maynooth University.

== Early life ==
Begg was born in north Dublin.

== Education ==
Begg holds master's degree in international relations from DCU and a PhD in sociology from Maynooth University. He is an adjunct professor at Maynooth University Institute of Social Sciences (MUSSI).

== Controversies ==
After the Jobstown Protest in November 2014, which saw a sit-down protest occur in front of Tánaiste Joan Burton's car, Begg stated that he believed that Burton's assistant, Labour Party official Karen O'Connell, was beaten and kicked. Some protestors were subsequently taken to court for false imprisonment but acquitted and subsequently charges were dropped against the remaining protestors.

On 13 January 2016 the same Tánaiste, Joan Burton, in her role as Social Protection Minister, appointed Begg as chair of the Pension Authority.

In 2022, University College Cork (UCC) were given a place on the Board of the Workplace Relations Commission when UCC HR Director Barry O'Brien was appointed to the board. In 2023, while a board member of the Workplace Relations Commission acting for UCC, O'Brien breached an employment contract and unilaterally fired the Dutch professor Wim Naude from UCC with no notice, no due process or right of appeal.

In the wake of a scandal in which a bicycle shelter at Irish government buildings cost the Irish taxpayer €336,000, a wall at the front of the Workplace Relations Commission building in Dublin was found to cost nearly half a million euros from public funds in 2022 and 2023.

In September 2025, Begg resigned from the board of the Mater Hospital while stating to Jennifer Carroll MacNeill, "you may be the health minister but you're not God."

Trade union offices
Preceded by John Mitchell	General Secretary of the Electricity Supply Board Officers' Association; 1982–1985	Succeeded by John Hall
Preceded by Terry Quinlan	General Secretary of the Post Office Workers' Union; 1985–1989	Succeeded by Position abolished
Preceded by Seamus De Paor	General Secretary of the Communication Workers' Union; 1990–1997	Succeeded by Con Scanlon
Preceded by Peter Cassells	General Secretary of the ICTU; 2001–2015	Succeeded by Patricia King
