= William Norton =

Irish politician (1900–1963)

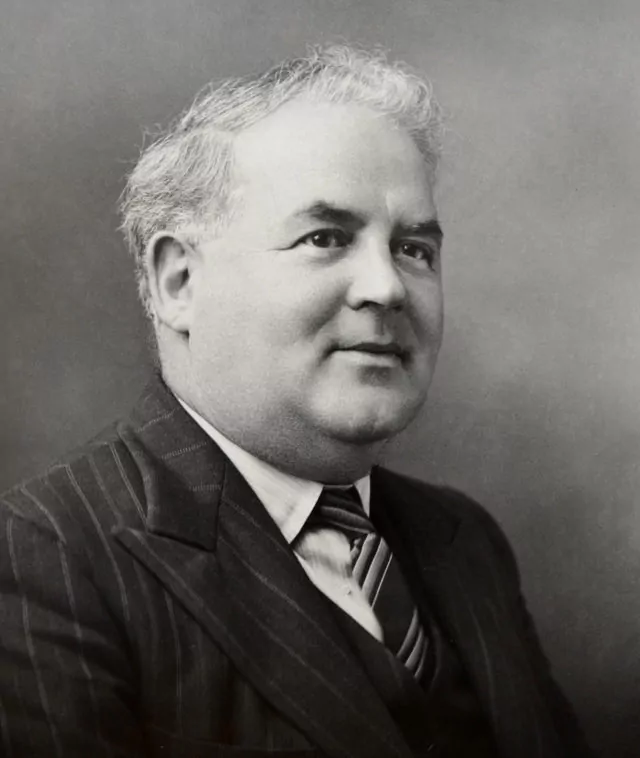
- Norton, c. 1940s

Tánaiste
- In office 2 June 1954 – 20 March 1957
- Taoiseach: John A. Costello
- Preceded by: Seán Lemass
- Succeeded by: Seán Lemass
- In office 18 February 1948 – 13 June 1951
- Taoiseach: John A. Costello
- Preceded by: Seán Lemass
- Succeeded by: Seán Lemass

Leader of the Labour Party
- In office 19 July 1932 – 2 March 1960
- Preceded by: Thomas J. O'Connell
- Succeeded by: Brendan Corish

Minister for Social Welfare
- In office 18 February 1948 – 13 June 1951
- Taoiseach: John A. Costello
- Preceded by: Seán Lemass
- Succeeded by: Seán Lemass

Minister for Industry and Commerce
- In office 2 June 1954 – 20 March 1957
- Taoiseach: John A. Costello
- Preceded by: Seán Lemass
- Succeeded by: Seán Lemass

Teachta Dála
- In office February 1948 – 4 December 1963
- Constituency: Kildare
- In office February 1937 – February 1948
- Constituency: Carlow–Kildare
- In office February 1932 – July 1937
- Constituency: Kildare
- In office February 1926 – June 1927
- Constituency: Dublin County

Personal details
- Born: 2 November 1900 Abbotstown, Dublin, Ireland
- Died: 4 December 1963 (aged 63) Dublin, Ireland
- Party: Labour Party
- Spouse: Helen MacNamee (m. 1922)
- Children: 5, including Patrick

William Joseph Norton (2 November 1900 – 4 December 1963) was an Irish Labour Party politician who served as Tánaiste from 1948 to 1951 and from 1954 to 1957, Leader of the Labour Party from 1932 to 1960, Minister for Social Welfare from 1948 to 1951 and Minister for Industry and Commerce from 1954 to 1957. He was a Teachta Dála (TD) from 1926 to 1927 and from 1932 to 1961.

Norton was born in Dublin in 1900. He joined the postal service in 1916. By 1920, he was a prominent member of the Irish Postal Union and the wider trade union movement in Ireland. From 1924 to 1957, he served as Secretary of the Post Office Workers' Union.

Norton as a young TD, circa late 1920s

He was elected as a Labour Party TD for Dublin County at a by-election in 1926, but was defeated at the June 1927 general election. On constitutional matters, Norton opposed the introduction into force of the Executive Authority (External Relations) Act 1936 which continued a role for the British King after the King was removed from the Constitution of Ireland. In Norton’s view, the association with the British King should have ended when Edward VIII “voluntarily relinquished his objectionable role here”.

In Professor Tom Garvin's review of the 1950s 'News from a New Republic', he comes in for praise as a moderniser. Garvin places him with a cross party group including Gerard Sweetman and Daniel Morrissey of Fine Gael as well as Seán Lemass of Fianna Fáil who were pushing a modernising agenda. He represented Kildare from 1932 until his death in 1963.

In 1932, he became leader of the Labour Party. In the First Inter-Party Government from 1948 to 1951, Norton became Tánaiste and Minister for Social Welfare. In the Second Inter-Party Government from 1954 to 1957, Norton served as Tánaiste and Minister for Industry and Commerce.

William Norton died in Dublin in 1963. His son Patrick Norton served as a TD for Kildare from 1965 to 1969.

== See also ==
- Families in the Oireachtas

Political offices
Preceded by James Ryan	Minister for Social Welfare; 1948–1951	Succeeded by James Ryan
Preceded by Seán Lemass	Tánaiste; 1948–1951	Succeeded by Seán Lemass
Preceded by Seán Lemass	Minister for Industry and Commerce; 1954–1957	Succeeded by Seán Lemass
Preceded by Seán Lemass	Tánaiste; 1954–1957	Succeeded by Seán Lemass
Party political offices
Preceded by Thomas J. O'Connell	Leader of the Labour Party; 1932–1960	Succeeded by Brendan Corish
Trade union offices
New office	General Secretary of the Post Office Workers' Union; 1924–1957	Succeeded by William Bell
Preceded by Charles Geddes	President of the Postal, Telegraph and Telephone International; 1957–1960	Succeeded by Carl Stenger

Dáil	Election	Deputy (Party)	Deputy (Party)	Deputy (Party)	Deputy (Party)
9th	1937	William Norton (Lab)	Thomas Harris (FF)	Francis Humphreys (FF)	Sydney Minch (FG)
10th	1938	William Norton (Lab)	Thomas Harris (FF)	Francis Humphreys (FF)	James Hughes (FG)
11th	1943	William Norton (Lab)	Thomas Harris (FF)	Francis Humphreys (FF)	James Hughes (FG)
12th	1944	William Norton (Lab)	Thomas Harris (FF)	Francis Humphreys (FF)	James Hughes (FG)
13th	1948	Constituency abolished. See Carlow–Kilkenny and Kildare			

Dáil	Election	Deputy (Party)	Deputy (Party)	Deputy (Party)
4th	1923	Hugh Colohan (Lab)	John Conlan (FP)	George Wolfe (CnaG)
5th	1927 (Jun)	Hugh Colohan (Lab)	Domhnall Ua Buachalla (FF)	George Wolfe (CnaG)
6th	1927 (Sep)	Hugh Colohan (Lab)	Domhnall Ua Buachalla (FF)	George Wolfe (CnaG)
6th	1931 by-election	Thomas Harris (FF)	Domhnall Ua Buachalla (FF)	George Wolfe (CnaG)
7th	1932	Thomas Harris (FF)	William Norton (Lab)	Sydney Minch (CnaG)
8th	1933	Thomas Harris (FF)	William Norton (Lab)	Sydney Minch (CnaG)
9th	1937	Constituency abolished. See Carlow–Kildare		

Dáil	Election	Deputy (Party)	Deputy (Party)	Deputy (Party)	Deputy (Party)	Deputy (Party)
13th	1948	William Norton (Lab)	Thomas Harris (FF)	Gerard Sweetman (FG)	3 seats until 1961	3 seats until 1961
14th	1951	William Norton (Lab)	Thomas Harris (FF)	Gerard Sweetman (FG)	3 seats until 1961	3 seats until 1961
15th	1954	William Norton (Lab)	Thomas Harris (FF)	Gerard Sweetman (FG)	3 seats until 1961	3 seats until 1961
16th	1957	William Norton (Lab)	Patrick Dooley (FF)	Gerard Sweetman (FG)	3 seats until 1961	3 seats until 1961
17th	1961	William Norton (Lab)	Patrick Dooley (FF)	Gerard Sweetman (FG)	Brendan Crinion (FF)	4 seats 1961–1969
17th	1964 by-election	Terence Boylan (FF)	Patrick Dooley (FF)	Gerard Sweetman (FG)	Brendan Crinion (FF)	4 seats 1961–1969
18th	1965	Terence Boylan (FF)	Patrick Norton (Lab)	Gerard Sweetman (FG)	Brendan Crinion (FF)	4 seats 1961–1969
19th	1969	Terence Boylan (FF)	Paddy Power (FF)	Gerard Sweetman (FG)	3 seats 1969–1981	3 seats 1969–1981
19th	1970 by-election	Terence Boylan (FF)	Paddy Power (FF)	Patrick Malone (FG)	3 seats 1969–1981	3 seats 1969–1981
20th	1973	Joseph Bermingham (Lab)	Paddy Power (FF)	Patrick Malone (FG)	3 seats 1969–1981	3 seats 1969–1981
21st	1977	Joseph Bermingham (Lab)	Paddy Power (FF)	Charlie McCreevy (FF)	3 seats 1969–1981	3 seats 1969–1981
22nd	1981	Joseph Bermingham (Lab)	Paddy Power (FF)	Charlie McCreevy (FF)	Bernard Durkan (FG)	Alan Dukes (FG)
23rd	1982 (Feb)	Joseph Bermingham (Lab)	Paddy Power (FF)	Charlie McCreevy (FF)	Gerry Brady (FF)	Alan Dukes (FG)
24th	1982 (Nov)	Joseph Bermingham (Lab)	Paddy Power (FF)	Charlie McCreevy (FF)	Bernard Durkan (FG)	Alan Dukes (FG)
25th	1987	Emmet Stagg (Lab)	Paddy Power (FF)	Charlie McCreevy (FF)	Bernard Durkan (FG)	Alan Dukes (FG)
26th	1989	Emmet Stagg (Lab)	Seán Power (FF)	Charlie McCreevy (FF)	Bernard Durkan (FG)	Alan Dukes (FG)
27th	1992	Emmet Stagg (Lab)	Seán Power (FF)	Charlie McCreevy (FF)	Bernard Durkan (FG)	Alan Dukes (FG)
28th	1997	Constituency abolished. See Kildare North and Kildare South				

Dáil	Election	Deputy (Party)	Deputy (Party)	Deputy (Party)	Deputy (Party)	Deputy (Party)	Deputy (Party)	Deputy (Party)	Deputy (Party)
2nd	1921	Michael Derham (SF)	George Gavan Duffy (SF)	Séamus Dwyer (SF)	Desmond FitzGerald (SF)	Frank Lawless (SF)	Margaret Pearse (SF)	6 seats 1921–1923	
3rd	1922	Michael Derham (PT-SF)	George Gavan Duffy (PT-SF)	Thomas Johnson (Lab)	Desmond FitzGerald (PT-SF)	Darrell Figgis (Ind)	John Rooney (FP)	6 seats 1921–1923	
4th	1923	Michael Derham (CnaG)	Bryan Cooper (Ind)	Thomas Johnson (Lab)	Desmond FitzGerald (CnaG)	Darrell Figgis (Ind)	John Good (Ind)	Kathleen Lynn (Rep)	Kevin O'Higgins (CnaG)
4th	1924 by-election	Batt O'Connor (CnaG)	Bryan Cooper (Ind)	Thomas Johnson (Lab)	Desmond FitzGerald (CnaG)	Darrell Figgis (Ind)	John Good (Ind)	Kathleen Lynn (Rep)	Kevin O'Higgins (CnaG)
4th	1926 by-election	Batt O'Connor (CnaG)	Bryan Cooper (Ind)	Thomas Johnson (Lab)	Desmond FitzGerald (CnaG)	William Norton (Lab)	John Good (Ind)	Kathleen Lynn (Rep)	Kevin O'Higgins (CnaG)
5th	1927 (Jun)	Batt O'Connor (CnaG)	Bryan Cooper (Ind)	Thomas Johnson (Lab)	Desmond FitzGerald (CnaG)	Patrick Belton (FF)	John Good (Ind)	Seán MacEntee (FF)	Kevin O'Higgins (CnaG)
5th	1927 by-election	Batt O'Connor (CnaG)	Bryan Cooper (Ind)	Thomas Johnson (Lab)	Desmond FitzGerald (CnaG)	Patrick Belton (FF)	John Good (Ind)	Seán MacEntee (FF)	Gearóid O'Sullivan (CnaG)
6th	1927 (Sep)	Batt O'Connor (CnaG)	Bryan Cooper (CnaG)	Joseph Murphy (Ind)	Desmond FitzGerald (CnaG)	Seán Brady (FF)	John Good (Ind)	Seán MacEntee (FF)	Gearóid O'Sullivan (CnaG)
6th	1930 by-election	Batt O'Connor (CnaG)	Thomas Finlay (CnaG)	Joseph Murphy (Ind)	Desmond FitzGerald (CnaG)	Seán Brady (FF)	John Good (Ind)	Seán MacEntee (FF)	Gearóid O'Sullivan (CnaG)
7th	1932	Batt O'Connor (CnaG)	Thomas Finlay (CnaG)	Patrick Curran (Lab)	Henry Dockrell (CnaG)	Seán Brady (FF)	John Good (Ind)	Seán MacEntee (FF)	Gearóid O'Sullivan (CnaG)
8th	1933	Batt O'Connor (CnaG)	John A. Costello (CnaG)	Margaret Mary Pearse (FF)	Henry Dockrell (CnaG)	Seán Brady (FF)	John Good (Ind)	Seán MacEntee (FF)	Gearóid O'Sullivan (CnaG)
8th	1935 by-election	Cecil Lavery (FG)	John A. Costello (CnaG)	Margaret Mary Pearse (FF)	Henry Dockrell (CnaG)	Seán Brady (FF)	John Good (Ind)	Seán MacEntee (FF)	Gearóid O'Sullivan (CnaG)
9th	1937	Cecil Lavery (FG)	Henry Dockrell (FG)	Gerrard McGowan (Lab)	Patrick Fogarty (FF)	Seán Brady (FF)	5 seats 1937–1948		
10th	1938	Patrick Belton (FG)	Henry Dockrell (FG)	Thomas Mullen (FF)	Patrick Fogarty (FF)	Seán Brady (FF)	5 seats 1937–1948		
11th	1943	Liam Cosgrave (FG)	Henry Dockrell (FG)	James Tunney (Lab)	Patrick Fogarty (FF)	Seán Brady (FF)	5 seats 1937–1948		
12th	1944	Liam Cosgrave (FG)	Henry Dockrell (FG)	Patrick Burke (FF)	Patrick Fogarty (FF)	Seán Brady (FF)	5 seats 1937–1948		
12th	1947 by-election	Liam Cosgrave (FG)	Henry Dockrell (FG)	Patrick Burke (FF)	Seán MacBride (CnaP)	Seán Brady (FF)	5 seats 1937–1948		
13th	1948	Éamon Rooney (FG)	Seán Dunne (Lab)	Patrick Burke (FF)	3 seats 1948–1961				
14th	1951	Éamon Rooney (FG)	Seán Dunne (Lab)	Patrick Burke (FF)	3 seats 1948–1961				
15th	1954	Éamon Rooney (FG)	Seán Dunne (Lab)	Patrick Burke (FF)	3 seats 1948–1961				
16th	1957	Éamon Rooney (FG)	Kevin Boland (FF)	Patrick Burke (FF)	3 seats 1948–1961				
17th	1961	Éamon Rooney (FG)	Kevin Boland (FF)	Patrick Burke (FF)	Mark Clinton (FG)	Seán Dunne (Ind)	5 seats 1961–1969		
18th	1965	Des Foley (FF)	Kevin Boland (FF)	Patrick Burke (FF)	Mark Clinton (FG)	Seán Dunne (Lab)	5 seats 1961–1969		
19th	1969	Constituency abolished. See Dublin County North and Dublin County South							
