= Andrew Belton =

British yeoman soldier and colonial army officer

- Born: 17 April 1882; Cleator Moor, Cumberland, England
- Died: 1970 (aged 87–88); South Africa
- Military career
- Allegiance: British Empire
- Branch: Legion of Frontiersmen
- Rank: Major General
- Nickname: Kaid

Andrew Belton (17 April 1882 – 1970) was a British Army officer and veteran of campaigns in South Africa and Morocco. He was an early exponent of the use of aircraft for military purposes, enrolling at the Chicago School of Aviation in April 1911. He was an entrepreneur who registered a number of companies in the newly established Irish Free State.

== Military career ==
Following the deaths of two of his brothers during the Second Boer War, and though under age, Belton enlisted and saw service in Africa. On his return to England, he became aware of the developing military dispute in Morocco, subsequently known as the First Moroccan Crisis. Having apparently resigned his military commission, he assisted Abdelhafid, Caliph of Marrakesh pretender to the sultanate, in overthrowing his brother Abdelaziz, then sultan of Morocco, in the 1907–08 coup d'état known as the Hafidiya. This is how Belton acquired the title Kaid, or Commander.

During the Spanish Civil War, he was arrested in Seville having crossed the border from Gibraltar. He was instrumental in establishing the Independent Overseas Command of the Legion of Frontiersmen in Africa.

== Broadcasting enquiry ==
In 1924, Belton was at the centre of an investigation concerning allegations of Government corruption in the Irish Free State. He came to public attention when a letter from him to the Irish Postmaster General, J. J. Walsh was revealed by Walsh. Accusations of impropriety centred around the business relationship between Belton and Deputy Darrell Figgis, and Wireless Broadcasting concessions, which led to Belton almost gaining control of the Irish Broadcasting Company. The ensuing scandal finished Figgis' political career.

== Death ==
Andrew Belton died in South Africa in 1970 at the age of 88. He was survived by his third wife, Kathleen Belton née Mossop, who was a niece of the late Dean F.C Clayton, and also a son and daughter who lived in the south of England.
