= James Morrow (trade unionist) =

James Morrow (July 1904 – 1986) was an Irish trade unionist and politician.

Morrow grew up in Belfast, and studied at the Belfast Technical School. He became active in the Northern Ireland Labour Party and served as its chairman in 1949/50. He worked as an organiser for the Amalgamated Engineering Union, and in 1970 he served as President of the Irish Congress of Trade Unions.

Morrow contested Belfast South in the 1945 UK general election, taking 17.5% of the vote, then in Belfast North, at the 1951 general election, where he took 39.3%. He came closest to election in Belfast Duncairn at the 1945 Northern Ireland general election, taking 45.5% of the vote, but his share dropped to 16.9% in 1949, and recovered only slightly at a by-election held later in the year.

Trade union offices
Preceded by Jimmy Dunne	President of the Irish Congress of Trade Unions; 1970	Succeeded by Maurice Cosgrave
