= Energy Services Union =

- Energy Services Union {of Ireland} (Aontas Oibrithe Fuinnimh {na hEireann})
- Founded: 1959
- Headquarters: 43 East James's Place, Dublin
- Location: Ireland
- Members: 1,300
- Key people: Karen Halpenny (President) Karan O'Loughlin (General Secretary) Maria Irish (Vice President)
- Affiliations: Irish Congress of Trade Unions
- Website: www.esu.ie

The Energy Services Union {of Ireland} (Aontas Oibrithe Fuinnimh {na hEireann} is a trade union representing workers at the ESB Group in Ireland. As of 2024 ESU is the last "in-house" trade union left in Ireland.

Until the late 1950s, most staff at the Electricity Supply Board (ESB) were represented by the Amalgamated Transport and General Workers' Union. In 1959, a strike among clerical staff at the ESB was unsuccessful, and this led the clerical section to found a new union, Electricity Supply Board Officers' Association (ESBOA). By the following year had a membership of 1,116, growing to 1,800 ten years later, and 3,005 in 1990. It affiliated to the Irish Congress of Trades Unions in 1976. David Begg became its general secretary in 1982, serving for three years.

By 2012, the union also had members working for Endesa, EirGrid and Airtricity, and as a result it renamed itself as the "Energy Services Union [of Ireland]".

== Presidents ==
1986-90 Delores "Delo" Collier
1990-94 Paddy Reilly
1994-98 Tony Mullins
1998-2002: Philomena Harrington
2002-06: John Nugent
2006-10: Dave Byrne
2010-13: Treasa Ni Mhurchú
2013-17: Ann Lynch
2017-21: Karen Halpenny
2021-25: Anthony Kelly
2025- : Karen Halpenny

== General Secretaries ==
1960: Franklin O'Sullivan
1964: N. Farrelly
1965: R. Kinch
1968: R. McElroy
1969: E. Harpur
1972: Louis Gillick
1975: Micheál Ó Foghlú
1978: John Mitchell
1982: David Begg
1985: John Hall
1991: Willie Cremins
2008: Tony Dunne
2010: Fran O'Neill
2024: Karan O'Loughlin
