= Irish Postal Union =

Defunct Irish trade union

- Merged into: Post Office Workers' Union
- Founded: 1900
- Dissolved: 1923
- Headquarters: 4 Cavendish Row, Dublin
- Location: Ireland
- Members: 2,500 (1921)

The Irish Postal Union (IPU) was a trade union representing clerks, telegraphists and telephonists working in the Post Office in Ireland.

The union was founded in 1900 as the Dual Workers' Association, and in 1904 it was renamed as the Association of Irish Post Office Clerks. That year, it was recognised for negotiating purposes by the Postmaster General, but the union's journal was consistently critical of Post Office policies and, as a result, recognition was withdrawn in 1909. Following an agreement to stop publishing critical articles, recognition was reinstated.

By the 1910s, the union was the only body representing sorting clerks, telegraphists and telephonists in the Post Office in Ireland. Unlike most other unions in the service, it did not merge into the Union of Post Office Workers (UPW) on its formation. Once Northern Ireland was created, the IPU's members in the state were transferred to the UPW.

In 1920, the union renamed itself as the "Irish Postal Union". In 1923, it merged with the Irish Post Office Engineering Union and the Irish Postal Workers' Union, forming the Post Office Workers' Union.
