= Postal and Telecommunications Workers' Union =

Postal Telecommunications Workers' Union
- Merged into: Communication Workers' Union
- Founded: 1923
- Dissolved: 1989
- Location: Ireland
- Members: 7,821 (1970)
- Key people: William Norton (Gen Sec)
- Publication: An Dion: Postal Worker
- Affiliations: ICTU

The Postal and Telecommunications Workers' Union was a trade union representing communication workers in Ireland.

The union was founded in 1923 when the Irish Postal Union merged with the Irish Postal Workers' Union and the Irish Post Office Engineering Union (IPOEU), and was initially named the United Postal Union. The union immediately affiliated with the Irish Trades Union Congress, and from the start worked closely with the British Union of Post Office Workers. The IPOEU was unhappy with the merger arrangements, and so it withdrew early on, to continue an independent existence. The union was soon renamed as the Post Office Workers' Union (POWU).

From 1924 to 1957, the union was led by William Norton, who for much of this time also served as leader of the Labour Party. Under his leadership, the union steadily grew, from 4,000 members in 1930, to 7,302 in 1960. The small Transferred Officers' Protection Association amalgamated with the union in 1930, and the Post Office Clerical Association joined in 1958.

The union became the Postal Telecommunications Workers' Union in 1984. In 1989, it merged into the Communications Union of Ireland, which renamed itself as the Communication Workers' Union.

== General Secretaries ==
1924: William Norton
1957: William Bell
1966: Maurice Cosgrave
1973: Terry Quinlan
1985: David Begg
