= Seán McGuinness =

Irish politician (died 1978)

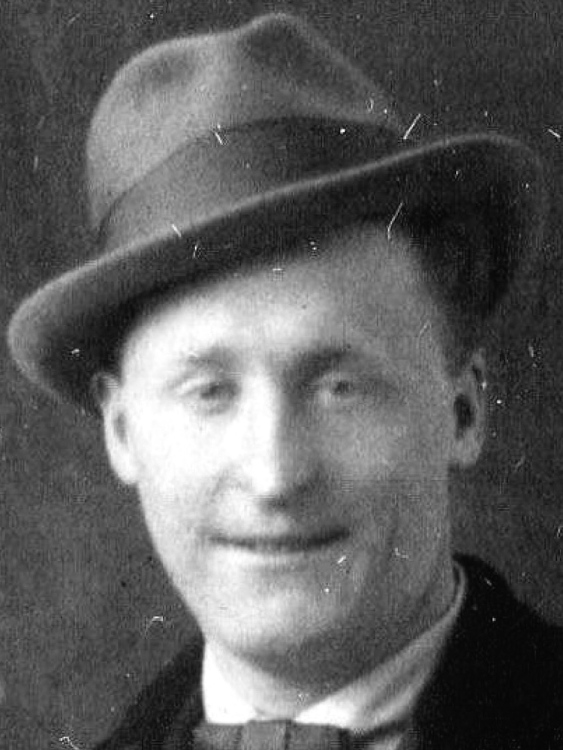
- McGuinness, c. early 1920s

Teachta Dála
- In office August 1923 – 30 November 1925
- Constituency: Laois–Offaly

Personal details
- Died: 28 October 1978
- Party: Sinn Féin; Saor Éire

Military service
- Branch/service: Irish Republican Army; Anti-Treaty IRA
- Rank: Officer commanding
- Unit: Offaly No. 1 Brigade
- Battles/wars: Irish War of Independence; Irish Civil War

Seán McGuinness (died 28 October 1978), born John McGuinness, was an Irish republican who fought in the Irish War of Independence as well as the Irish Civil War. After the wars, he was elected to Dáil Éireann but did not take his seat and was later disqualified for allegedly assaulting a member of the Garda Siochana. Following a period of exile in the United States, McGuinness returned to Ireland where he resumed his membership of the IRA and continued to push for radical action as well as becoming a founder of the Saor Éire party. Over the years, McGuinness repeatedly clashed with the leadership of the IRA over the direction they should take in the post-Civil War era, with McGuinness being amongst those in the IRA who believed the organisation needed to be tied to social issues in order to receive public support.

== Soldier ==
During the Irish War of Independence McGuinness was officer commanding of the Offaly Brigade of the Irish Republican Army. Following the signing of the Anglo-Irish Treaty in December 1921 which ended the War of Independence, McGuinness choose the Anti-Treaty side in the ensuing Irish Civil War. It is alleged that, under his command, an incident occurred in January 1923 in which members of the Offaly brigade rounded up a number of local women, shaved their heads and chained them to railings as punishment for "consorting with the enemy". It was also during the Civil War that three men under McGuinness' command were expelled for "minor misdemeanours". Following their expulsion, the three men were later executed by the National Army for what McGuinness said was a "few minor robberies", but which court records stated was "summary execution for armed robbery". McGuinness stated that "their crime was nothing compared with that of the great betrayal of the Republic by the authority responsible for the killing of these three youths".

== TD ==
Immediately following the end of the Civil War in May 1923, McGuinness was elected at the August 1923 general election as an anti-Treaty Sinn Féin Teachta Dála (TD) for Laois–Offaly; along with other Republican TDs elected in that Dáil, he did not take his seat. In 1924, McGuinness wrote a letter to the IRA leadership in which he stated his belief that the republican movement needed to be built around the issues of land agitation and land redistribution.

On 29 October 1925 McGuinness was convicted of assaulting, resisting and obstructing a sergeant of the Garda Síochána and of a similar charge relating to a Peace Officer. He was sentenced to 18 months imprisonment with hard labour and was therefore disqualified from membership of the Dáil on 30 November 1925 under section 51(2)(a) of the Electoral Act 1923. The resulting by-election for his seat in the 4th Dáil was held on 18 February 1926, and won by the Cumann na nGaedheal candidate James Dwyer. Initially McGuinness was imprisoned in Mountjoy Prison, however he managed to escape in November 1925 and fled to the United States, where he remained for 5 years before returning to his homeland in 1930.

== Social agitation ==
Upon his return to Ireland, McGuinness once again became active in the Irish Republican Army amidst the increasingly tense political atmosphere in the country. In April 1931, McGuinness was reported to have openly drilled with 100 members of the IRA in public. When members of the Gardai appeared, McGuinness reportedly dared them to try and arrest him or any of his men.

In 1931 McGuinness became a founding member of the National Executive Board for Saor Éire, a far-left political organisation established in September 1931 by communist-leaning members of the Irish Republican Army (IRA), with the backing of the IRA leadership. After Saor Éire was not only denounced by the government but also members of the Catholic clergy, McGuinness tried to argue that as a "Sound Catholic" himself, his membership of both the IRA and Saor Éire proved that one could be a member of those organisations without compromising one's faith. McGuinness' public acknowledgement of his membership in both the IRA and Saor Éire eventually led to McGuinness once again being arrested and sentenced for membership of a proscribed organisation in April 1931. This time McGuinness served his sentence in Ireland until March 1932, when he was released under a general amnesty to members of the IRA granted by the newly elected Fianna Fáil government, who had just won the 1932 general election.

McGuinness continued to push for radical action following his release. At first, he petitioned the leadership of the IRA to allow him to conduct a campaign against the payment of "land annuities" by the Irish public. The "land annuities" were taxes levied on the Irish citizenry to pay off debts owed to the British government going back to the 1880s. Following the establishment of an independent Irish state, these taxes continued to be paid but by 1932, Republican political thought come to believe this debt should no longer exist. Following a debate on the matter in May 1932, the IRA leadership rejected McGuinness's plan, fearing it would interfere with Éamon de Valera's own plans to end the annuities as part of the Anglo-Irish trade war. However, McGuinness continued to advocate his anti-annuities ideas, and even published them in the Labour magazine Workers Voice, for which he was reprimanded.

Continuing to defy the IRA leadership, McGuinness and the Offaly IRA members under his influence became involved in trying to prevent the eviction of an elderly man, Patrick Craven, from an estate in Kinnitty in July 1932. Working as a caretaker, Craven had lived in the gatehouse of the estate for 19 years. However, the Irish Land Commission had taken control of the estate and had sold it to Captain Joseph Nugent, formerly an officer in the National Army during the Civil War, and now sought to evict Craven as part of the sale. Believing he had found an issue he could leverage to the IRA's advantage, McGuinness ordered his men to occupy and barricade the gatehouse to prevent an eviction. Simultaneously, McGuinness' brother Patrick (who was head of the local Fianna Fáil branch), wired local Fianna Fáil TDs Patrick Boland and Patrick Gorry to demand they support the action and join protests in its favour. Both Boland and Gorry did arrive on the scene immediately, but it did not take part. Instead, Boland convinced the local Fianna Fáil branches that Fianna Fáil was now locked in an economic war with the UK and could not commit itself to minor local matters. Gorry, on the other hand, met with McGuinness personally, and while opining that the land belonged legally to Nugent, he had managed to arrange with the Sherriff to hold off on the eviction for two days to give Craven a chance to move. Taking Gorry on his word, McGuinness stood down his men. According to Gorry, Gorry then left for Dublin, where he met with the Minister of Justice James Geoghegan, where he was assured there would be no eviction. However, by the next morning, the Craven family was evicted and sent to the poor house.

Moss Twomey, IRA Chief-of-Staff, was furious with McGuinness. Twomey stated that not only had McGuinness defied his orders, he had been hoodwinked and left the IRA looking incompetent to the public. McGuinness retorted that, rather than embarrassing the IRA, the event had shown there was no difference between Fianna Fáil and Cumann na nGaedheal governments in practice. Attempting to salvage the situation, McGuinness tried to arrange a boycott of Nugent. He also requested from the IRA leadership that two speakers be sent to him, one of them being the socialist Peadar O'Donnell. McGuinness' requests for speakers was denied, as they believed locals should speak on the matter, however, O'Donnell arrived nonetheless upon learning of the situation. At an organised protest, McGuinness and O'Donnell tried to lay blame at the feet of the Fianna Fáil government. However, many other speakers at the protest were Fianna Fáil TDs and councillors, all of whom redirected criticisms elsewhere. The protests did not reinstate the Craven family onto the property, however, money was raised to build them a new home elsewhere.

The Kinnitty eviction left McGuinness disillusioned with attempting to drive the IRA against Fianna Fáil and thereafter his social agitation ceased.

| Dáil | Election | Deputy (Party) | Deputy (Party) | Deputy (Party) | Deputy (Party) | Deputy (Party) |
|---|---|---|---|---|---|---|
| 2nd | 1921 | Joseph Lynch (SF) | Patrick McCartan (SF) | Francis Bulfin (SF) | Kevin O'Higgins (SF) | 4 seats 1921–1923 |
| 3rd | 1922 | William Davin (Lab) | Patrick McCartan (PT-SF) | Francis Bulfin (PT-SF) | Kevin O'Higgins (PT-SF) | 4 seats 1921–1923 |
| 4th | 1923 | William Davin (Lab) | Laurence Brady (Rep) | Francis Bulfin (CnaG) | Patrick Egan (CnaG) | Seán McGuinness (Rep) |
| 4th | 1926 by-election | William Davin (Lab) | Laurence Brady (Rep) | Francis Bulfin (CnaG) | Patrick Egan (CnaG) | James Dwyer (CnaG) |
| 5th | 1927 (Jun) | William Davin (Lab) | Patrick Boland (FF) | Thomas Tynan (FF) | John Gill (Lab) | James Dwyer (CnaG) |
| 6th | 1927 (Sep) | William Davin (Lab) | Patrick Boland (FF) | Patrick Gorry (FF) | William Aird (CnaG) | James Dwyer (CnaG) |
| 7th | 1932 | William Davin (Lab) | Patrick Boland (FF) | Patrick Gorry (FF) | Thomas F. O'Higgins (CnaG) | Eugene O'Brien (CnaG) |
| 8th | 1933 | William Davin (Lab) | Patrick Boland (FF) | Eamon Donnelly (FF) | Thomas F. O'Higgins (CnaG) | Jack Finlay (NCP) |
| 9th | 1937 | William Davin (Lab) | Patrick Boland (FF) | Patrick Gorry (FF) | Thomas F. O'Higgins (FG) | Jack Finlay (FG) |
| 10th | 1938 | William Davin (Lab) | Patrick Boland (FF) | Patrick Gorry (FF) | Thomas F. O'Higgins (FG) | Daniel Hogan (FF) |
| 11th | 1943 | William Davin (Lab) | Patrick Boland (FF) | Patrick Gorry (FF) | Thomas F. O'Higgins (FG) | Oliver J. Flanagan (IMR) |
| 12th | 1944 | William Davin (Lab) | Patrick Boland (FF) | Patrick Gorry (FF) | Thomas F. O'Higgins (FG) | Oliver J. Flanagan (IMR) |
| 13th | 1948 | William Davin (Lab) | Patrick Boland (FF) | Patrick Gorry (FF) | Tom O'Higgins, Jnr (FG) | Oliver J. Flanagan (Ind.) |
| 14th | 1951 | William Davin (Lab) | Patrick Boland (FF) | Peadar Maher (FF) | Tom O'Higgins, Jnr (FG) | Oliver J. Flanagan (Ind.) |
| 15th | 1954 | William Davin (Lab) | Nicholas Egan (FF) | Peadar Maher (FF) | Tom O'Higgins, Jnr (FG) | Oliver J. Flanagan (FG) |
| 15th | 1956 by-election | Kieran Egan (FF) | Nicholas Egan (FF) | Peadar Maher (FF) | Tom O'Higgins, Jnr (FG) | Oliver J. Flanagan (FG) |
| 16th | 1957 | Kieran Egan (FF) | Nicholas Egan (FF) | Peadar Maher (FF) | Tom O'Higgins, Jnr (FG) | Oliver J. Flanagan (FG) |
| 17th | 1961 | Kieran Egan (FF) | Nicholas Egan (FF) | Patrick Lalor (FF) | Tom O'Higgins, Jnr (FG) | Oliver J. Flanagan (FG) |
| 18th | 1965 | Henry Byrne (Lab) | Nicholas Egan (FF) | Patrick Lalor (FF) | Tom O'Higgins, Jnr (FG) | Oliver J. Flanagan (FG) |
| 19th | 1969 | Ger Connolly (FF) | Bernard Cowen (FF) | Patrick Lalor (FF) | Tom Enright (FG) | Oliver J. Flanagan (FG) |
| 20th | 1973 | Ger Connolly (FF) | Charles McDonald (FG) | Patrick Lalor (FF) | Tom Enright (FG) | Oliver J. Flanagan (FG) |
| 21st | 1977 | Ger Connolly (FF) | Bernard Cowen (FF) | Patrick Lalor (FF) | Tom Enright (FG) | Oliver J. Flanagan (FG) |
| 22nd | 1981 | Ger Connolly (FF) | Bernard Cowen (FF) | Liam Hyland (FF) | Tom Enright (FG) | Oliver J. Flanagan (FG) |
| 23rd | 1982 (Feb) | Ger Connolly (FF) | Bernard Cowen (FF) | Liam Hyland (FF) | Tom Enright (FG) | Oliver J. Flanagan (FG) |
| 24th | 1982 (Nov) | Ger Connolly (FF) | Bernard Cowen (FF) | Liam Hyland (FF) | Tom Enright (FG) | Oliver J. Flanagan (FG) |
| 24th | 1984 by-election | Ger Connolly (FF) | Brian Cowen (FF) | Liam Hyland (FF) | Tom Enright (FG) | Oliver J. Flanagan (FG) |
| 25th | 1987 | Ger Connolly (FF) | Brian Cowen (FF) | Liam Hyland (FF) | Tom Enright (FG) | Charles Flanagan (FG) |
| 26th | 1989 | Ger Connolly (FF) | Brian Cowen (FF) | Liam Hyland (FF) | Tom Enright (FG) | Charles Flanagan (FG) |
| 27th | 1992 | Ger Connolly (FF) | Brian Cowen (FF) | Liam Hyland (FF) | Pat Gallagher (Lab) | Charles Flanagan (FG) |
| 28th | 1997 | John Moloney (FF) | Brian Cowen (FF) | Seán Fleming (FF) | Tom Enright (FG) | Charles Flanagan (FG) |
| 29th | 2002 | John Moloney (FF) | Brian Cowen (FF) | Seán Fleming (FF) | Olwyn Enright (FG) | Tom Parlon (PDs) |
| 30th | 2007 | John Moloney (FF) | Brian Cowen (FF) | Seán Fleming (FF) | Olwyn Enright (FG) | Charles Flanagan (FG) |
| 31st | 2011 | Brian Stanley (SF) | Barry Cowen (FF) | Seán Fleming (FF) | Marcella Corcoran Kennedy (FG) | Charles Flanagan (FG) |
| 32nd | 2016 | Constituency abolished. See Laois and Offaly. | | | | |
| 33rd | 2020 | Brian Stanley (SF) | Barry Cowen (FF) | Seán Fleming (FF) | Carol Nolan (Ind.) | Charles Flanagan (FG) |
| 33rd | 2024 | Brian Stanley (SF) | (Vacant) | Seán Fleming (FF) | Carol Nolan (Ind.) | Charles Flanagan (FG) |
| 34th | 2024 | Constituency abolished. See Laois and Offaly. | | | | |
