= 24th Dáil =

TDs from 1982 to 1987

←	23rd Dáil	25th Dáil	→

Overview
- Legislative body: Dáil Éireann
- Jurisdiction: Ireland
- Meeting place: Leinster House
- Term: 14 December 1982 – 20 January 1987
- Election: November 1982 general election
- Government: 19th government of Ireland
- Members: 166
- Ceann Comhairle: Tom Fitzpatrick
- Taoiseach: Garret FitzGerald
- Tánaiste: Peter Barry — Dick Spring until 20 January 1987
- Chief Whip: Fergus O'Brien — Seán Barrett until 13 February 1986
- Leader of the Opposition: Charles Haughey

Sessions
- 1st: 14 December 1982 – 8 July 1983
- 2nd: 5 July 1984 – 30 June 1988
- 3rd: 10 October 1984 – 11 July 1985
- 4th: 23 October 1985 – 4 July 1986
- 5th: 22 October 1986 – 19 December 1986

The 24th Dáil was elected at the November 1982 general election on 24 November 1982 and met on 14 December 1982. The members of Dáil Éireann, the house of representatives of the Oireachtas (legislature), of Ireland are known as TDs. It sat with the 17th Seanad as the two Houses of the Oireachtas.

On 20 January 1987, President Patrick Hillery dissolved the Dáil at the request of the Taoiseach Garret FitzGerald. The 24th Dáil lasted 4 years, 37 days.

== Composition of the 24th Dáil ==
- 19th government coalition parties

Party	Nov. 1982	Jan. 1987	Change
Fianna Fáil	75	71	▼4
Fine Gael	70	67	▼3
Labour	16	14	▼2
Workers' Party	2	2	Steady
Progressive Democrats	—N/a	5	▲5
Independent Fianna Fáil	1	1	Steady
Independent	2	4	▲2
Ceann Comhairle	—N/a	1	▲1
Vacant	—N/a	1	▲1
Total	166		

Fine Gael and the Labour Party formed the 19th government of Ireland. Labour left the government on 20 January 1987, after which FitzGerald sought a dissolution of the Dáil.

=== Graphical representation ===
This is a graphical comparison of party strengths in the 24th Dáil from December 1982. This was not the official seating plan.

== Ceann Comhairle ==
On the meeting of the Dáil, Tom Fitzpatrick (FG) was proposed by Garret FitzGerald (FG) and seconded by Peter Barry (FG) for the position of Ceann Comhairle. John O'Connell (Ind), who had served in the position in the previous two Dála, was proposed by Neil Blaney (IFF) and seconded by Proinsias De Rossa (WP). Fitzpatrick was elected on a vote of 86 to 80.

== TDs by constituency ==
The list of the 166 TDs elected is given in alphabetical order by Dáil constituency.

Members of the 24th Dáil
Constituency	Name	Party
Carlow–Kilkenny	Liam Aylward	Fianna Fáil
Carlow–Kilkenny	Kieran Crotty	Fine Gael
Carlow–Kilkenny	Dick Dowling	Fine Gael
Carlow–Kilkenny	M. J. Nolan	Fianna Fáil
Carlow–Kilkenny	Séamus Pattison	Labour
Cavan–Monaghan	John Conlan	Fine Gael
Cavan–Monaghan	Tom Fitzpatrick	Fine Gael
Cavan–Monaghan	Jimmy Leonard	Fianna Fáil
Cavan–Monaghan	Rory O'Hanlon	Fianna Fáil
Cavan–Monaghan	John Wilson	Fianna Fáil
Clare	Sylvester Barrett	Fianna Fáil
Clare	Donal Carey	Fine Gael
Clare	Brendan Daly	Fianna Fáil
Clare	Madeleine Taylor-Quinn	Fine Gael
Cork East	Michael Ahern	Fianna Fáil
Cork East	Myra Barry	Fine Gael
Cork East	Patrick Hegarty	Fine Gael
Cork East	Ned O'Keeffe	Fianna Fáil
Cork North-Central	Bernard Allen	Fine Gael
Cork North-Central	Liam Burke	Fine Gael
Cork North-Central	Denis Lyons	Fianna Fáil
Cork North-Central	Toddy O'Sullivan	Labour
Cork North-Central	Dan Wallace	Fianna Fáil
Cork North-West	Donal Creed	Fine Gael
Cork North-West	Frank Crowley	Fine Gael
Cork North-West	Donal Moynihan	Fianna Fáil
Cork South-Central	Peter Barry	Fine Gael
Cork South-Central	Hugh Coveney	Fine Gael
Cork South-Central	Eileen Desmond	Labour
Cork South-Central	Gene Fitzgerald	Fianna Fáil
Cork South-Central	Pearse Wyse	Fianna Fáil
Cork South-West	Jim O'Keeffe	Fine Gael
Cork South-West	P. J. Sheehan	Fine Gael
Cork South-West	Joe Walsh	Fianna Fáil
Donegal North-East	Neil Blaney	Independent Fianna Fáil
Donegal North-East	Hugh Conaghan	Fianna Fáil
Donegal North-East	Paddy Harte	Fine Gael
Donegal South-West	Clement Coughlan	Fianna Fáil
Donegal South-West	Pat "the Cope" Gallagher	Fianna Fáil
Donegal South-West	Dinny McGinley	Fine Gael
Dublin Central	Bertie Ahern	Fianna Fáil
Dublin Central	George Colley	Fianna Fáil
Dublin Central	Alice Glenn	Fine Gael
Dublin Central	Tony Gregory	Independent
Dublin Central	Michael Keating	Fine Gael
Dublin North	John Boland	Fine Gael
Dublin North	Ray Burke	Fianna Fáil
Dublin North	Nora Owen	Fine Gael
Dublin North-Central	Vincent Brady	Fianna Fáil
Dublin North-Central	Richard Bruton	Fine Gael
Dublin North-Central	George Birmingham	Fine Gael
Dublin North-Central	Charles Haughey	Fianna Fáil
Dublin North-East	Michael Joe Cosgrave	Fine Gael
Dublin North-East	Liam Fitzgerald	Fianna Fáil
Dublin North-East	Maurice Manning	Fine Gael
Dublin North-East	Michael Woods	Fianna Fáil
Dublin North-West	Michael Barrett	Fianna Fáil
Dublin North-West	Proinsias De Rossa	Workers' Party
Dublin North-West	Mary Flaherty	Fine Gael
Dublin North-West	Jim Tunney	Fianna Fáil
Dublin South	Niall Andrews	Fianna Fáil
Dublin South	Séamus Brennan	Fianna Fáil
Dublin South	Nuala Fennell	Fine Gael
Dublin South	John Kelly	Fine Gael
Dublin South	Alan Shatter	Fine Gael
Dublin South-Central	Ben Briscoe	Fianna Fáil
Dublin South-Central	Frank Cluskey	Labour
Dublin South-Central	Gay Mitchell	Fine Gael
Dublin South-Central	Fergus O'Brien	Fine Gael
Dublin South-Central	John O'Connell	Independent
Dublin South-East	Gerard Brady	Fianna Fáil
Dublin South-East	Joe Doyle	Fine Gael
Dublin South-East	Garret FitzGerald	Fine Gael
Dublin South-East	Ruairi Quinn	Labour
Dublin South-West	Mary Harney	Fianna Fáil
Dublin South-West	Michael O'Leary	Fine Gael
Dublin South-West	Mervyn Taylor	Labour
Dublin South-West	Seán Walsh	Fianna Fáil
Dublin West	Eileen Lemass	Fianna Fáil
Dublin West	Brian Lenihan	Fianna Fáil
Dublin West	Tomás Mac Giolla	Workers' Party
Dublin West	Jim Mitchell	Fine Gael
Dublin West	Liam Skelly	Fine Gael
Dún Laoghaire	David Andrews	Fianna Fáil
Dún Laoghaire	Monica Barnes	Fine Gael
Dún Laoghaire	Seán Barrett	Fine Gael
Dún Laoghaire	Barry Desmond	Labour
Dún Laoghaire	Liam T. Cosgrave	Fine Gael
Galway East	Paul Connaughton Snr	Fine Gael
Galway East	Michael P. Kitt	Fianna Fáil
Galway East	Noel Treacy	Fianna Fáil
Galway West	Fintan Coogan Jnr	Fine Gael
Galway West	John Donnellan	Fine Gael
Galway West	Frank Fahey	Fianna Fáil
Galway West	Máire Geoghegan-Quinn	Fianna Fáil
Galway West	Bobby Molloy	Fianna Fáil
Kerry North	Denis Foley	Fianna Fáil
Kerry North	Tom McEllistrim	Fianna Fáil
Kerry North	Dick Spring	Labour
Kerry South	Michael Begley	Fine Gael
Kerry South	Michael Moynihan	Labour
Kerry South	John O'Leary	Fianna Fáil
Kildare	Joseph Bermingham	Labour
Kildare	Alan Dukes	Fine Gael
Kildare	Bernard Durkan	Fine Gael
Kildare	Charlie McCreevy	Fianna Fáil
Kildare	Paddy Power	Fianna Fáil
Laois–Offaly	Ger Connolly	Fianna Fáil
Laois–Offaly	Bernard Cowen	Fianna Fáil
Laois–Offaly	Tom Enright	Fine Gael
Laois–Offaly	Oliver J. Flanagan	Fine Gael
Laois–Offaly	Liam Hyland	Fianna Fáil
Limerick East	Michael Noonan	Fine Gael
Limerick East	Willie O'Dea	Fianna Fáil
Limerick East	Tom O'Donnell	Fine Gael
Limerick East	Desmond O'Malley	Fianna Fáil
Limerick East	Frank Prendergast	Labour
Limerick West	Gerry Collins	Fianna Fáil
Limerick West	Michael J. Noonan	Fianna Fáil
Limerick West	William O'Brien	Fine Gael
Longford–Westmeath	Patrick Cooney	Fine Gael
Longford–Westmeath	Gerry L'Estrange	Fine Gael
Longford–Westmeath	Mary O'Rourke	Fianna Fáil
Longford–Westmeath	Albert Reynolds	Fianna Fáil
Louth	Michael Bell	Labour
Louth	Pádraig Faulkner	Fianna Fáil
Louth	Séamus Kirk	Fianna Fáil
Louth	Brendan McGahon	Fine Gael
Mayo East	Seán Calleary	Fianna Fáil
Mayo East	P. J. Morley	Fianna Fáil
Mayo East	Paddy O'Toole	Fine Gael
Mayo West	Pádraig Flynn	Fianna Fáil
Mayo West	Denis Gallagher	Fianna Fáil
Mayo West	Enda Kenny	Fine Gael
Meath	John Bruton	Fine Gael
Meath	John Farrelly	Fine Gael
Meath	Jim Fitzsimons	Fianna Fáil
Meath	Colm Hilliard	Fianna Fáil
Meath	Frank McLoughlin	Labour
Roscommon	Seán Doherty	Fianna Fáil
Roscommon	Terry Leyden	Fianna Fáil
Roscommon	Liam Naughten	Fine Gael
Sligo–Leitrim	Matt Brennan	Fianna Fáil
Sligo–Leitrim	Joe McCartin	Fine Gael
Sligo–Leitrim	Ray MacSharry	Fianna Fáil
Sligo–Leitrim	Ted Nealon	Fine Gael
Tipperary North	David Molony	Fine Gael
Tipperary North	Michael O'Kennedy	Fianna Fáil
Tipperary North	John Ryan	Labour
Tipperary South	Seán Byrne	Fianna Fáil
Tipperary South	Brendan Griffin	Fine Gael
Tipperary South	Seán McCarthy	Fianna Fáil
Tipperary South	Seán Treacy	Labour
Waterford	Edward Collins	Fine Gael
Waterford	Austin Deasy	Fine Gael
Waterford	Jackie Fahey	Fianna Fáil
Waterford	Donal Ormonde	Fianna Fáil
Wexford	John Browne	Fianna Fáil
Wexford	Hugh Byrne	Fianna Fáil
Wexford	Michael D'Arcy	Fine Gael
Wexford	Avril Doyle	Fine Gael
Wexford	Ivan Yates	Fine Gael
Wicklow	Paudge Brennan	Fianna Fáil
Wicklow	Gemma Hussey	Fine Gael
Wicklow	Liam Kavanagh	Labour
Wicklow	Godfrey Timmins	Fine Gael

== Changes ==
Date	Constituency	Loss	Gain	Note
14 December 1982	Cavan–Monaghan	Fine Gael	Ceann Comhairle	Tom Fitzpatrick takes office as Ceann Comhairle
1 February 1983	Donegal South-West	Fianna Fáil		Death of Clement Coughlan
8 February 1983	Roscommon	Fianna Fáil	Independent	Seán Doherty resigns Fianna Fáil whip after revelations of the phone tapping scandal emerged
13 May 1983	Donegal South-West		Fianna Fáil	Cathal Coughlan holds the seat vacated by the death of his brother Clement Coughlan
17 September 1983	Dublin Central	Fianna Fáil		Death of George Colley
23 November 1983	Dublin Central		Fianna Fáil	Tom Leonard holds seat vacated by the death of Colley
24 January 1984	Laois–Offaly	Fianna Fáil		Death of Bernard Cowen
18 May 1984	Limerick East	Fianna Fáil	Independent	Desmond O'Malley loses Fianna Fáil whip after support for New Ireland Forum Report
14 June 1984	Laois–Offaly		Fianna Fáil	Brian Cowen holds seat vacated by the death of his father Bernard Cowen
5 December 1984	Roscommon	Independent	Fianna Fáil	Seán Doherty readmitted to parliamentary party
18 February 1985	Dublin South-Central	Independent	Fianna Fáil	John O'Connell joins Fianna Fáil
21 February 1985	Tipperary South	Labour	Independent	Seán Treacy leaves Labour after voting against Health (Family Planning) (Amendment) Bill 1985
27 November 1985	Dublin South-West	Fianna Fáil	Independent	Mary Harney loses Fianna Fáil whip after voting for the Anglo-Irish Agreement
21 December 1985	Limerick East	Independent	Progressive Democrats	Desmond O'Malley founds the Progressive Democrats as leader
21 December 1985	Dublin South-West	Independent	Progressive Democrats	Mary Harney founds the Progressive Democrats
20 January 1986	Cork South-Central	Fianna Fáil	Progressive Democrats	Pearse Wyse leaves Fianna Fáil and joins the Progressive Democrats
23 January 1986	Galway West	Fianna Fáil	Progressive Democrats	Bobby Molloy leaves Fianna Fáil and joins the Progressive Democrats
9 April 1986	Dublin Central	Fine Gael	Progressive Democrats	Michael Keating leaves Fine Gael and joins the Progressive Democrats
10 June 1986	Kildare	Labour	Independent	Joseph Bermingham leaves Labour Party
9 December 1986	Dublin Central	Fine Gael	Independent	Alice Glenn leaves Fine Gael
21 June 1986	Donegal South-West	Fianna Fáil		Death of Cathal Coughlan
