= 26th Dáil =

TDs from 1989 to 1992

←	25th Dáil	27th Dáil	→

Overview
- Legislative body: Dáil Éireann
- Jurisdiction: Ireland
- Meeting place: Leinster House
- Term: 29 June 1989 – 5 November 1992
- Election: 1989 general election
- Government: 21st government of Ireland (1989–1992); 22nd government of Ireland (1992–1993)
- Members: 166
- Ceann Comhairle: Seán Treacy
- Taoiseach: Albert Reynolds — Charles Haughey until 11 February 1992
- Tánaiste: John Wilson — Brian Lenihan until 31 October 1990
- Chief Whip: Noel Dempsey — Dermot Ahern until 11 February 1992 — Vincent Brady until 14 November 1991
- Leader of the Opposition: John Bruton — Alan Dukes until 20 November 1990

Sessions
- 1st: 29 June 1989 – 20 July 1989
- 2nd: 24 October 1989 – 13 July 1990
- 3rd: 28 August 1990 – 12 July 1991
- 4th: 16 October 1991 – 10 July 1992
- 5th: 7 October 1992 – 5 November 1992

The 26th Dáil was elected at the 1989 general election on 15 June 1989 and met on 29 June 1989. The members of Dáil Éireann, the house of representatives of the Oireachtas (legislature) of Ireland, are known as TDs. It sat with the 19th Seanad as the two Houses of the Oireachtas.

The 26th Dáil lasted 3 years, 129 days, and saw a change of Taoiseach from Charles Haughey to Albert Reynolds. The 26th Dáil was dissolved by President Mary Robinson on 5 November 1992, at the request of the Taoiseach Albert Reynolds. There were no by-elections during the 26th Dáil.

== Composition of the 26th Dáil ==
- 21st, 22nd government coalition parties

Party	June 1989	Nov. 1992	Change
Fianna Fáil	77	77	Steady
Fine Gael	55	55	Steady
Labour (Note: The Democratic Socialist Party merged into Labour in May 1990.)	15	16	▲1
Workers' Party (Note: 6 Workers' Party TDs broke away and formed Democratic Left in February 1992.)	7	1	▼6
Progressive Democrats	6	6	Steady
Green	1	1	Steady
Democratic Socialist	1	—N/a	▼1
Democratic Left	—N/a	6	▲6
Independent Fianna Fáil	1	1	Steady
Independent	3	2	▼1
Ceann Comhairle	—N/a	1	▲1
Total	166		

On 12 July 1989, Fianna Fáil and the Progressive Democrats formed the 21st government of Ireland, led by Charles Haughey. On 11 February 1992, they formed the 22nd government of Ireland led by Albert Reynolds. The Progressive Democrats left the government on 4 November 1992.

=== Graphical representation ===
This is a graphical comparison of party strengths in the 26th Dáil from June 1989. This was not the official seating plan.

== Ceann Comhairle ==
On 29 June 1989, Seán Treacy (Ind) was proposed by Charles Haughey for the position of Ceann Comhairle. Alan Dukes proposed Paddy Harte for the position. Treacy was approved by a vote of 87 to 78.

== TDs by constituency ==
The list of the 166 TDs elected is given in alphabetical order by Dáil constituency.

Members of the 26th Dáil
Constituency	Name	Party
Carlow–Kilkenny	Liam Aylward	Fianna Fáil
Carlow–Kilkenny	John Browne	Fine Gael
Carlow–Kilkenny	Phil Hogan	Fine Gael
Carlow–Kilkenny	M. J. Nolan	Fianna Fáil
Carlow–Kilkenny	Séamus Pattison	Labour
Cavan–Monaghan	Andrew Boylan	Fine Gael
Cavan–Monaghan	Bill Cotter	Fine Gael
Cavan–Monaghan	Jimmy Leonard	Fianna Fáil
Cavan–Monaghan	Rory O'Hanlon	Fianna Fáil
Cavan–Monaghan	John Wilson	Fianna Fáil
Clare	Donal Carey	Fine Gael
Clare	Brendan Daly	Fianna Fáil
Clare	Síle de Valera	Fianna Fáil
Clare	Madeleine Taylor-Quinn	Fine Gael
Cork East	Michael Ahern	Fianna Fáil
Cork East	Paul Bradford	Fine Gael
Cork East	Ned O'Keeffe	Fianna Fáil
Cork East	Joe Sherlock	Workers' Party
Cork North-Central	Bernard Allen	Fine Gael
Cork North-Central	Denis Lyons	Fianna Fáil
Cork North-Central	Gerry O'Sullivan	Labour
Cork North-Central	Máirín Quill	Progressive Democrats
Cork North-Central	Dan Wallace	Fianna Fáil
Cork North-West	Michael Creed	Fine Gael
Cork North-West	Frank Crowley	Fine Gael
Cork North-West	Laurence Kelly	Fianna Fáil
Cork South-Central	Peter Barry	Fine Gael
Cork South-Central	John Dennehy	Fianna Fáil
Cork South-Central	Micheál Martin	Fianna Fáil
Cork South-Central	Toddy O'Sullivan	Labour
Cork South-Central	Pearse Wyse	Progressive Democrats
Cork South-West	Jim O'Keeffe	Fine Gael
Cork South-West	P. J. Sheehan	Fine Gael
Cork South-West	Joe Walsh	Fianna Fáil
Donegal North-East	Neil Blaney	Independent Fianna Fáil
Donegal North-East	Paddy Harte	Fine Gael
Donegal North-East	Jim McDaid	Fianna Fáil
Donegal South-West	Mary Coughlan	Fianna Fáil
Donegal South-West	Pat "the Cope" Gallagher	Fianna Fáil
Donegal South-West	Dinny McGinley	Fine Gael
Dublin Central	Bertie Ahern	Fianna Fáil
Dublin Central	Dermot Fitzpatrick	Fianna Fáil
Dublin Central	Tony Gregory	Independent
Dublin Central	Pat Lee	Fine Gael
Dublin Central	John Stafford	Fianna Fáil
Dublin North	Ray Burke	Fianna Fáil
Dublin North	Nora Owen	Fine Gael
Dublin North	Seán Ryan	Labour
Dublin North-Central	Vincent Brady	Fianna Fáil
Dublin North-Central	Richard Bruton	Fine Gael
Dublin North-Central	Ivor Callely	Fianna Fáil
Dublin North-Central	Charles Haughey	Fianna Fáil
Dublin North-East	Michael Joe Cosgrave	Fine Gael
Dublin North-East	Liam Fitzgerald	Fianna Fáil
Dublin North-East	Pat McCartan	Workers' Party
Dublin North-East	Michael Woods	Fianna Fáil
Dublin North-West	Michael Barrett	Fianna Fáil
Dublin North-West	Proinsias De Rossa	Workers' Party
Dublin North-West	Mary Flaherty	Fine Gael
Dublin North-West	Jim Tunney	Fianna Fáil
Dublin South	Séamus Brennan	Fianna Fáil
Dublin South	Nuala Fennell	Fine Gael
Dublin South	Roger Garland	Green
Dublin South	Tom Kitt	Fianna Fáil
Dublin South	Alan Shatter	Fine Gael
Dublin South-Central	Ben Briscoe	Fianna Fáil
Dublin South-Central	Eric Byrne	Workers' Party
Dublin South-Central	Gay Mitchell	Fine Gael
Dublin South-Central	Fergus O'Brien	Fine Gael
Dublin South-Central	John O'Connell	Fianna Fáil
Dublin South-East	Gerard Brady	Fianna Fáil
Dublin South-East	Joe Doyle	Fine Gael
Dublin South-East	Garret FitzGerald	Fine Gael
Dublin South-East	Ruairi Quinn	Labour
Dublin South-West	Chris Flood	Fianna Fáil
Dublin South-West	Mary Harney	Progressive Democrats
Dublin South-West	Pat Rabbitte	Workers' Party
Dublin South-West	Mervyn Taylor	Labour
Dublin West	Austin Currie	Fine Gael
Dublin West	Liam Lawlor	Fianna Fáil
Dublin West	Brian Lenihan	Fianna Fáil
Dublin West	Jim Mitchell	Fine Gael
Dublin West	Tomás Mac Giolla	Workers' Party
Dún Laoghaire	David Andrews	Fianna Fáil
Dún Laoghaire	Monica Barnes	Fine Gael
Dún Laoghaire	Seán Barrett	Fine Gael
Dún Laoghaire	Eamon Gilmore	Workers' Party
Dún Laoghaire	Brian Hillery	Fianna Fáil
Galway East	Paul Connaughton Snr	Fine Gael
Galway East	Michael Kitt	Fianna Fáil
Galway East	Noel Treacy	Fianna Fáil
Galway West	Frank Fahey	Fianna Fáil
Galway West	Máire Geoghegan-Quinn	Fianna Fáil
Galway West	Michael D. Higgins	Labour
Galway West	Pádraic McCormack	Fine Gael
Galway West	Bobby Molloy	Progressive Democrats
Kerry North	Jimmy Deenihan	Fine Gael
Kerry North	Tom McEllistrim	Fianna Fáil
Kerry North	Dick Spring	Labour
Kerry South	Michael Moynihan	Labour
Kerry South	John O'Donoghue	Fianna Fáil
Kerry South	John O'Leary	Fianna Fáil
Kildare	Alan Dukes	Fine Gael
Kildare	Bernard Durkan	Fine Gael
Kildare	Charlie McCreevy	Fianna Fáil
Kildare	Seán Power	Fianna Fáil
Kildare	Emmet Stagg	Labour
Laois–Offaly	Ger Connolly	Fianna Fáil
Laois–Offaly	Brian Cowen	Fianna Fáil
Laois–Offaly	Tom Enright	Fine Gael
Laois–Offaly	Charles Flanagan	Fine Gael
Laois–Offaly	Liam Hyland	Fianna Fáil
Limerick East	Peadar Clohessy	Progressive Democrats
Limerick East	Jim Kemmy	Democratic Socialist
Limerick East	Michael Noonan	Fine Gael
Limerick East	Willie O'Dea	Fianna Fáil
Limerick East	Desmond O'Malley	Progressive Democrats
Limerick West	Gerry Collins	Fianna Fáil
Limerick West	Michael Finucane	Fine Gael
Limerick West	Michael J. Noonan	Fianna Fáil
Longford–Westmeath	Louis Belton	Fine Gael
Longford–Westmeath	Paul McGrath	Fine Gael
Longford–Westmeath	Mary O'Rourke	Fianna Fáil
Longford–Westmeath	Albert Reynolds	Fianna Fáil
Louth	Dermot Ahern	Fianna Fáil
Louth	Séamus Kirk	Fianna Fáil
Louth	Brendan McGahon	Fine Gael
Louth	Michael Bell	Labour
Mayo East	Seán Calleary	Fianna Fáil
Mayo East	Jim Higgins	Fine Gael
Mayo East	P. J. Morley	Fianna Fáil
Mayo West	Pádraig Flynn	Fianna Fáil
Mayo West	Enda Kenny	Fine Gael
Mayo West	Martin O'Toole	Fianna Fáil
Meath	John Bruton	Fine Gael
Meath	Noel Dempsey	Fianna Fáil
Meath	John Farrelly	Fine Gael
Meath	Colm Hilliard	Fianna Fáil
Meath	Mary Wallace	Fianna Fáil
Roscommon	John Connor	Fine Gael
Roscommon	Tom Foxe	Independent
Roscommon	Terry Leyden	Fianna Fáil
Sligo–Leitrim	Matt Brennan	Fianna Fáil
Sligo–Leitrim	John Ellis	Fianna Fáil
Sligo–Leitrim	Ted Nealon	Fine Gael
Sligo–Leitrim	Gerry Reynolds	Fine Gael
Tipperary North	Michael Lowry	Fine Gael
Tipperary North	Michael O'Kennedy	Fianna Fáil
Tipperary North	Michael Smith	Fianna Fáil
Tipperary South	Theresa Ahearn	Fine Gael
Tipperary South	Noel Davern	Fianna Fáil
Tipperary South	Michael Ferris	Labour
Tipperary South	Seán Treacy	Independent
Waterford	Austin Deasy	Fine Gael
Waterford	Jackie Fahey	Fianna Fáil
Waterford	Brendan Kenneally	Fianna Fáil
Waterford	Brian O'Shea	Labour
Wexford	John Browne	Fianna Fáil
Wexford	Séamus Cullimore	Fianna Fáil
Wexford	Brendan Howlin	Labour
Wexford	Michael D'Arcy	Fine Gael
Wexford	Ivan Yates	Fine Gael
Wicklow	Dick Roche	Fianna Fáil
Wicklow	Joe Jacob	Fianna Fáil
Wicklow	Liam Kavanagh	Labour
Wicklow	Godfrey Timmins	Fine Gael

== Changes ==
Date	Constituency	Loss	Gain	Note
29 June 1989	Tipperary South	Independent	Ceann Comhairle	Seán Treacy takes office as Ceann Comhairle
1 May 1990	Limerick East	Democratic Socialist	Labour	Jim Kemmy joins Labour following DSP approval of merger
22 February 1992	Dublin North-West	Workers' Party	Democratic Left	Proinsias De Rossa leaves Workers' Party and establishes new party Democratic Left, initially called New Agenda, as party leader
22 February 1992	Cork East	Workers' Party	Democratic Left	Joe Sherlock leaves Workers' Party to join Democratic Left
22 February 1992	Dublin North-East	Workers' Party	Democratic Left	Pat McCartan leaves Workers' Party to join Democratic Left
22 February 1992	Dublin South-Central	Workers' Party	Democratic Left	Eric Byrne leaves Workers' Party to join Democratic Left
22 February 1992	Dublin South-West	Workers' Party	Democratic Left	Pat Rabbitte leaves Workers' Party to join Democratic Left
22 February 1992	Dún Laoghaire	Workers' Party	Democratic Left	Eamon Gilmore leaves Workers' Party to join Democratic Left
