= Garret Ahearn =

Irish politician (born 1980)

Senator Garret Ahearn
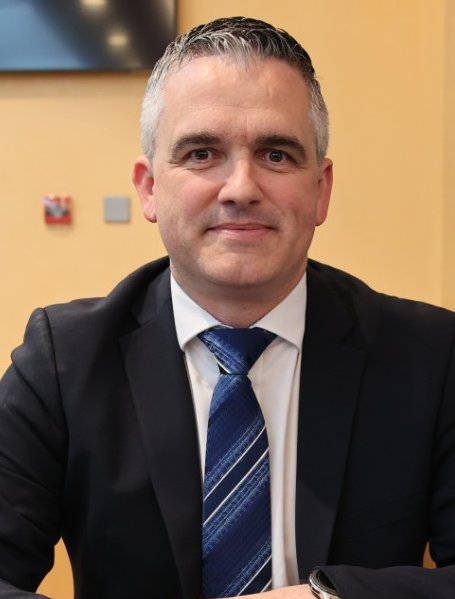
- Ahearn in 2025

Leader of the Seanad
- Incumbent
- Assumed office 17 June 2026
- Taoiseach: Micheál Martin
- Preceded by: Seán Kyne

Senator
- Incumbent
- Assumed office 29 June 2020
- Constituency: Administrative Panel

Tipperary County Councillor
- In office May 2019 – April 2020
- Constituency: Clonmel

Personal details
- Born: 1980 or 1981 (age 45–46) Dublin, Ireland
- Party: Fine Gael
- Spouse: Laura Whelan
- Children: 2
- Parent: Theresa Ahearn (mother)

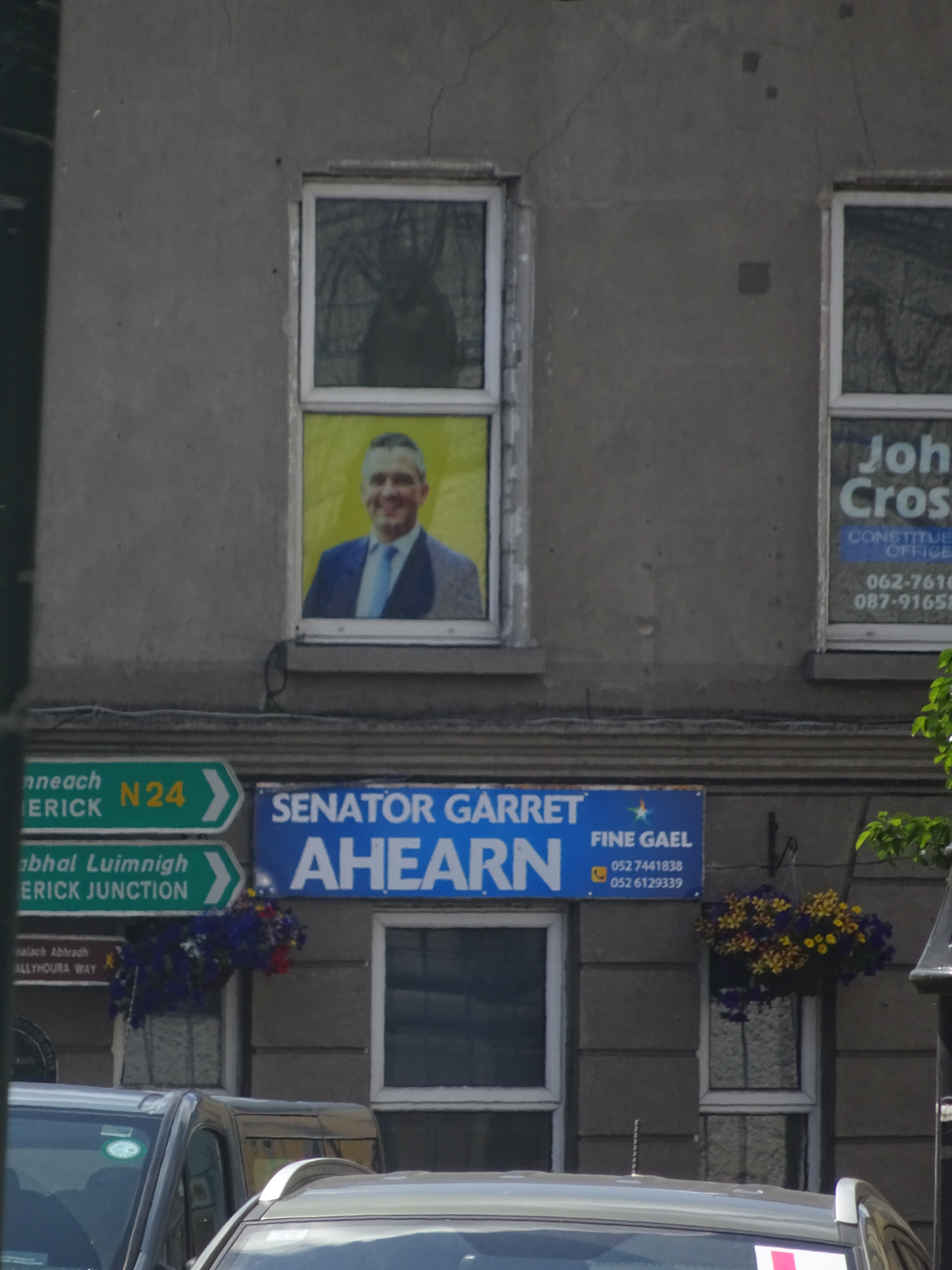
Office in Tipperary Town

Garret Ahearn (born 1980) is the Leader of the Seanad and an Irish Fine Gael politician who has been a senator for the Administrative Panel since April 2020. He is vice-chair of the Joint Oireachtas Committee on Foreign Affairs and Trade.

He was vice-chair of the Fine Gael parliamentary party until March 2025. He was Seanad Government chief whip until June 2026. He is Fine Gael spokesperson for Foreign Affairs. He was vice-chair of the Oireachtas Joint Committee on Enterprise, Trade and Employment until November 2024.

Prior to becoming a senator, he was a member of Tipperary County Council from 2019 to 2020. He was Mayor of Clonmel from 2019 to 2020.

He unsuccessfully contested the Tipperary constituency at the 2020 general election.

He is the son of Theresa Ahearn, who served as a Fine Gael TD for the Tipperary South constituency from 1989 to 2000.

Ahearn was appointed as Leader of the Seanad in June 2026.
