= Timoney =

Timoney is a surname. Notable people with the surname include:

- Bill Timoney (born 1958), American actor, voice actor, director, script writer and producer
- John Timoney (police chief) (1948−2016), Chief of Police of Miami from 2006
- John Timoney (politician) (1909–1961), Irish Clann na Poblachta politician
- Nathan Timoney (born 2000), Irish rower
- Pádraig Timoney (born 1968), Irish artist

== See also ==
- Timoney Technology Limited of Ireland
- McTimoney College of Chiropractic, chiropractic college, managed and operated by BPP University in Abingdon, Oxfordshire, England
- Timoney (armoured personnel carrier)
