= John Timoney =

John Timoney may refer to:

- John Timoney (police officer) (1948−2016), Chief of Police of Miami from 2006
- John Timoney (politician) (1909–1961), Irish Clann na Poblachta politician
