= Brendan Griffin =

Brendan Griffin may refer to:

- Brendan Griffin (Tipperary politician) (born 1935), Irish Fine Gael politician representing Tipperary South
- Brendan Griffin (Kerry politician) (born 1982), Irish Fine Gael politician representing Kerry South
