= Michael Ferris =

Michael Ferris may refer to:

- Michael Ferris (politician) (1931–2000), Irish Labour Party politician
- Michael Ferris (screenwriter), American screenwriter
