= 2004 South Tipperary County Council election =

Part of the 2004 Irish local elections

- 11 June 2004

All 26 seats on South Tipperary County Council
	First party	Second party	Third party
Party	Fianna Fáil	Fine Gael	Labour
Seats won	10	8	2
Seat change	-2	-1	+1
	Fourth party
Party	Independent
Seats won	6
Seat change	+2
- Map showing the area of South Tipperary County Council
Council control after election
TBD

An election to South Tipperary County Council took place on 11 June 2004 as part of that year's Irish local elections. 26 councillors were elected from five local electoral areas (LEAs) for a five-year term of office on the electoral system of proportional representation by means of the single transferable vote (PR-STV).

== Results by party ==
Party	Seats	±	First Pref. votes	FPv%	±%
Fianna Fáil	10	-2	14,561	34.86	
Fine Gael	8	-1	11,641	27.87	
Labour	2	+1	4,000	9.58	
Independent	6	+2	8,751	20.95	
Totals	26	-	41,770	100.00	—

== Results by local electoral area ==
=== Cahir ===
Cahir - 4 seats
Party	Candidate	FPv%	Count									
Party	Candidate	FPv%	1	2	3	4	5	6	7	8	9	10
Fianna Fáil	Mattie McGrath*	27.58	1,902									
Fianna Fáil	Michael Anglim*	16.24	1,120	1,315	1,322	1,363	1,474					
Fine Gael	Liam Ahearn	11.21	773	818	824	849	870	878	900	977	1,054	1,297
Labour	Seanie Lonergan	9.15	631	667	693	712	733	740	823	940	978	1,080
Fine Gael	Dan Costigan*	7.87	543	566	582	604	633	641	694	768	803	941
Fine Gael	Marie Murphy	6.93	478	522	524	555	568	570	609	651	774	
Fianna Fáil	Martin Neville	5.06	349	411	412	428	449	484	504	528		
Independent	Gerry Duffy	4.77	329	351	378	392	401	407	448			
Sinn Féin	Michael Nugent	4.07	281	306	315	319	345	351				
Fianna Fáil	Patrick Byron	3.22	222	257	257	275						
Progressive Democrats	Seán English	2.49	172	195	199							
Independent	Liam Roche	1.41	97	109								
Electorate: 10,248 Valid: 6,897 (67.30%) Spoilt: 107 Quota: 1,380 Turnout: 7,004 (68.35%)

=== Cashel ===
Cashel - 4 seats
Party	Candidate	FPv%	Count						
Party	Candidate	FPv%	1	2	3	4	5	6	7
Fine Gael	Jack Crowe*	20.62	1,565						
Fianna Fáil	Dr. Seán McCarthy*	16.53	1,255	1,262	1,337	1,398	1,481	1,522	
Independent	Tom Wood*	16.39	1,244	1,250	1,375	1,474	1,731		
Fianna Fáil	Roger Kennedy	10.08	765	771	829	876	984	1,029	1,427
Fine Gael	Catherine McLoughlin*	9.75	740	754	772	862	941	1,003	1,135
Fianna Fáil	Joseph O'Connell	8.27	628	632	652	759	788	805	
Independent	Patrick Downey	6.44	489	491	556	599			
Labour	Jim Hickey	5.99	455	460	504				
Sinn Féin	Liam Browne	5.93	450	452					
Electorate: 11,949 Valid: 7,591 (63.53%) Spoilt: 84 Quota: 1,519 Turnout: 7,675 (64.23%)

=== Clonmel ===
Clonmel - 7 seats
Party	Candidate	FPv%	Count											
Party	Candidate	FPv%	1	2	3	4	5	6	7	8	9	10	11	12
Workers and Unemployed	Phil Prendergast*	13.56	1,353											
Fianna Fáil	Tom Ambrose*	10.63	1,061	1,067	1,073	1,093	1,161	1,191	1,217	1,277				
Workers and Unemployed	Billy Shoer	8.68	866	895	927	947	983	1,064	1,169	1,198	1,198	1,299		
Workers and Unemployed	Pat English	8.04	802	815	827	836	866	908	978	1,011	1,013	1,070	1,079	1,240
Fianna Fáil	Pat Norris*	7.12	710	713	725	762	777	786	794	815	820	956	964	1,048
Fine Gael	Seán Nyhan*	6.31	630	638	653	667	699	747	776	918	921	1,004	1,012	1,129
Fianna Fáil	Martin O'Brien	6.30	629	637	649	660	682	709	738	770	772	885	891	963
Fine Gael	Derry Foley*	6.21	620	623	627	663	700	717	729	939	946	1,006	1,014	1,142
Fianna Fáil	Niall Dennehy*	5.92	591	596	602	620	665	690	710	745	751			
Fine Gael	Josephine Chamney	5.68	567	571	579	598	627	663	674					
Green	Bernard Lennon	5.21	520	526	536	569	591	639	708	770	774	850	862	
Sinn Féin	Brian Gearon	4.31	430	433	447	451	462	487						
Independent	Ted Boyle	3.72	371	375	384	393								
Labour	Anne Taylor	3.64	363	372	434	440	454							
Progressive Democrats	P.J. Long	2.49	248	249	251									
Labour	Cyril O'Flaherty	2.16	216	219										
Electorate: 16,321 Valid: 9,977 (61.13%) Spoilt: 177 Quota: 1,248 Turnout: 10,154 (62.21%)

=== Fethard ===
Fethard - 6 seats
Party	Candidate	FPv%	Count								
Party	Candidate	FPv%	1	2	3	4	5	6	7	8	9
Labour	Denis Landy*	15.30	1,449								
Independent	Eddie O'Meara*	14.35	1,359								
Fine Gael	John Fahey*	11.91	1,128	1,130	1,141	1,238	1,272	1,383			
Fine Gael	Michael O'Brien	9.52	901	904	917	963	981	1,087	1,114	1,127	1,130
Fianna Fáil	Susan Meagher*	8.99	851	852	895	976	1,014	1,441			
Fine Gael	Joe Brennan	8.87	840	856	931	965	1,067	1,108	1,117	1,127	1,129
Fianna Fáil	Pat O'Meara*	8.01	758	758	767	916	937				
Fianna Fáil	Denis Bourke*	7.17	679	702	888	903	1,072	1,136	1,188	1,195	1,196
Sinn Féin	David Dunne	5.79	548	565	623	655					
Labour	Noel Quinlan	5.37	508	523	534						
Fianna Fáil	Sylvia Cooney-Sheehan	4.72	447	466							
Electorate: 14,623 Valid: 9,468 (64.75%) Spoilt: 170 Quota: 1,353 Turnout: 9,638 (65.91%)

=== Tipperary ===
Tipperary - 5 seats
Party	Candidate	FPv%	Count							
Party	Candidate	FPv%	1	2	3	4	5	6	7	8
Fine Gael	Michael Fitzgerald*	22.04	1,727							
Fianna Fáil	Michael Maguire*	11.94	936	1,004	1,037	1,061	1,157	1,295	1,417	
Fianna Fáil	Joe Donovan*	11.18	876	949	982	1,012	1,065	1,109	1,163	1,179
Fianna Fáil	Dr. John Wallace	9.98	782	800	829	864	918	999	1,142	1,172
Independent	Christy Kinahan*	9.20	721	748	762	868	991	1,026	1,268	1,299
Independent	Denis Leahy	7.75	607	631	645	697	778	822		
Fine Gael	John Crosse	7.60	596	715	727	772	863	1,105	1,249	1,271
Fine Gael	P.J. Maher	6.80	533	580	590	605	659			
Independent	Mick Byrnes	6.55	513	528	539	600				
Labour	Billy Bourke	4.82	378	391	403					
Progressive Democrats	David Mullins	2.14	168	184						
Electorate: 12,473 Valid: 7,837 (62.83%) Spoilt: 130 Quota: 1,307 Turnout: 7,967 (63.87%)
