= William Ryan (Irish politician) =

Irish politician (1921–1994)

Senator
- In office 14 December 1961 – 1 November 1989
- Constituency: Agricultural Panel

Personal details
- Born: 21 September 1921 County Tipperary, Ireland
- Died: 2 January 1994 (aged 72) County Tipperary, Ireland
- Party: Fianna Fáil

William Ryan (21 September 1921 – 2 January 1994) was an Irish Fianna Fáil politician from County Tipperary. He was a senator from 1961 to 1989.

Born in Kilfeacle, County Tipperary, Ryan was elected in 1961 to the 10th Seanad on the Agricultural Panel. He was re-elected eight times, until he stood down at the 1989 election to the 19th Seanad.

Ryan also stood as a Fianna Fáil candidate for Dáil Éireann in the Tipperary South constituency at three successive general elections: 1965, 1969, 1973. He was unsuccessful on each occasion.
