= Theresa Ahearn =

Irish politician (1951–2000)

Teachta Dála
- In office June 1989 – 20 September 2000
- Constituency: Tipperary South

Personal details
- Born: Theresa Scott; 1 May 1951 Waterford, Ireland
- Died: 20 September 2000 (aged 49) Dublin, Ireland
- Party: Fine Gael
- Spouse: Liam Ahearn (m. 1981)
- Children: 4, including Garret
- Education: University College Dublin; St Patrick's College, Maynooth

Theresa Ahearn (née Scott; 1 May 1951 – 20 September 2000) was an Irish Fine Gael politician who served as a Teachta Dála for the Tipperary South constituency from 1989 to 2000.

== Political career ==
Her first elected office was as a member of South Tipperary County Council from 1983 until 1999. Noted as a highly effective orator, she was elected to the 26th Dáil as a Fine Gael TD for Tipperary South at the 1989 general election, becoming the only female Fine Gael deputy representing a rural constituency in the Dáil. She was re-elected at the 1992 and the 1997 general elections.

She served as Fine Gael spokesperson on higher-education in 1991, at one time calling for the Dublin Institute of Technology to be granted the power to award their own degrees, stating "The colleges, in particular the DIT, at this stage rightly claim to have long experience of teaching to degree level... I suggest that now is the time to give the colleges this power to award their own degrees".

She was appointed as a Fine Gael spokesperson on Labour in 1992, and from 1992 to 1993 on Energy. She was the spokesperson on Women's Affairs and Chairperson of Oireachtas Committee on Women's Rights 1993–1995. She had been the Fine Gael Junior spokesperson on Equality and Disability since September 1997. Ahearn was a member of the Joint Committees on Foreign Affairs and on Justice, Equality and Women's Rights, and of the Committee on Procedure and Privileges.

== Personal life ==
Theresa Scott was born in Waterford in 1951. She was from Golden, County Tipperary. She was educated at University College Dublin graduating with a Bachelor of Arts in History, Economics and Maths, and St Patrick's College, Maynooth with a Higher Diploma in Education, qualifying as a post-primary school teacher. She married Liam Ahearn in 1981, and they had four sons. They lived on the family farm near Clonmel, County Tipperary; her husband was a farmer.

Until her election to the Dáil, she taught mathematics at the Central Technical Institute, Clonmel.

Ahearn died of cancer on 20 September 2000 at Mount Carmel Hospital, Dublin. At the time of her death she was both a member of Fine Gael's National Executive Committee, and the first-ever female trustee of the party.

In the by-election after death, her Dáil seat in Tipperary South was retained for Fine Gael by Tom Hayes of Kilfeakle. She was the second TD in that constituency to die in 2000, the Labour's Michael Ferris having died on 20 March.

One of her sons, Garret Ahearn, was elected to Seanad Éireann in April 2020.

| Dáil | Election | Deputy (Party) | Deputy (Party) | Deputy (Party) | Deputy (Party) |
|---|---|---|---|---|---|
| 13th | 1948 | Michael Davern (FF) | Richard Mulcahy (FG) | Dan Breen (FF) | John Timoney (CnaP) |
| 14th | 1951 | Michael Davern (FF) | Richard Mulcahy (FG) | Dan Breen (FF) | Patrick Crowe (FG) |
| 15th | 1954 | Michael Davern (FF) | Richard Mulcahy (FG) | Dan Breen (FF) | Patrick Crowe (FG) |
| 16th | 1957 | Michael Davern (FF) | Richard Mulcahy (FG) | Dan Breen (FF) | Frank Loughman (FF) |
| 17th | 1961 | Michael Davern (FF) | Patrick Hogan (FG) | Dan Breen (FF) | Seán Treacy (Note: Treacy served as Ceann Comhairle in the 20th Dáil from 1973 to 1977, and was returned automatically at the 1977 election. He lost the Labour party whip in February 1985.) (Lab) |
| 18th | 1965 | Don Davern (FF) | Patrick Hogan (FG) | Jackie Fahey (FF) | Seán Treacy (Lab) |
| 19th | 1969 | Noel Davern (FF) | Patrick Hogan (FG) | Jackie Fahey (FF) | Seán Treacy (Lab) |
| 20th | 1973 | Noel Davern (FF) | Brendan Griffin (FG) | Jackie Fahey (FF) | Seán Treacy (Lab) |
| 21st | 1977 | Noel Davern (FF) | Brendan Griffin (FG) | 3 seats 1977–1981 | Seán Treacy (Lab) |
| 22nd | 1981 | Carrie Acheson (FF) | Brendan Griffin (FG) | Seán McCarthy (FF) | Seán Treacy (Lab) |
| 23rd | 1982 (Feb) | Seán Byrne (FF) | Brendan Griffin (FG) | Seán McCarthy (FF) | Seán Treacy (Lab) |
| 24th | 1982 (Nov) | Seán Byrne (FF) | Brendan Griffin (FG) | Seán McCarthy (FF) | Seán Treacy (Lab) |
| 25th | 1987 | Noel Davern (FF) | Brendan Griffin (FG) | Seán McCarthy (FF) | Seán Treacy (Note: Treacy served as Ceann Comhairle in the 25th, 26th and 27th Dáil from 1987 to 1997, and was returned automatically at the 1989 and 1992 elections.) (Ind.) |
| 26th | 1989 | Noel Davern (FF) | Theresa Ahearn (FG) | Michael Ferris (Lab) | Seán Treacy (Ind.) |
| 27th | 1992 | Noel Davern (FF) | Theresa Ahearn (FG) | Michael Ferris (Lab) | Seán Treacy (Ind.) |
| 28th | 1997 | Noel Davern (FF) | Theresa Ahearn (FG) | Michael Ferris (Lab) | 3 seats from 1997 |
| 28th | 2000 by-election | Noel Davern (FF) | Theresa Ahearn (FG) | Séamus Healy (Ind.) | 3 seats from 1997 |
| 28th | 2001 by-election | Noel Davern (FF) | Tom Hayes (FG) | Séamus Healy (Ind.) | 3 seats from 1997 |
| 29th | 2002 | Noel Davern (FF) | Tom Hayes (FG) | Séamus Healy (Ind.) | 3 seats from 1997 |
| 30th | 2007 | Mattie McGrath (FF) | Tom Hayes (FG) | Martin Mansergh (FF) | 3 seats from 1997 |
| 31st | 2011 | Mattie McGrath (Ind.) | Tom Hayes (FG) | Séamus Healy (WUA) | 3 seats from 1997 |
| 32nd | 2016 | Constituency abolished. See Tipperary | | | |

| Dáil | Election | Deputy (Party) | Deputy (Party) | Deputy (Party) |
|---|---|---|---|---|
| 34th | 2024 | Mattie McGrath (Ind.) | Michael Murphy (FG) | Séamus Healy (Ind.) |
