= Tom Hayes (Irish politician) =

Irish former politician (born 1952)

Minister of State
- 2013–2016: Agriculture, Food and the Marine

Teachta Dála
- In office June 2001 – February 2016
- Constituency: Tipperary South

Senator
- In office 17 September 1997 – 30 June 2001
- Constituency: Agricultural Panel

South Tipperary County Councillor
- In office 1991–2001
- Constituency: Cashel

Personal details
- Born: 16 February 1952 (age 74) Golden, County Tipperary, Ireland
- Party: Fine Gael
- Spouse: Marian Hayes
- Education: University College Cork

Tom Hayes (born 16 February 1952) is an Irish former Fine Gael politician who served as a Minister of State from 2013 to 2016. He served as a Teachta Dála (TD) for the Tipperary South constituency from 2001 to 2016. He was a Senator for the Agricultural Panel from 1997 to 2001.

Hayes was educated at Mount Melleray College, Waterford, and Tipperary Vocational School.

He was elected in 1997 to the 21st Seanad for the Agricultural Panel. He was Fine Gael Seanad spokesperson on Agriculture. He was elected on 30 June 2001 to the 28th Dáil, as a TD for Tipperary South, when he held the seat for Fine Gael in a by-election following the death of Theresa Ahearn. He was re-elected at the 2002, 2007 and 2011 general elections.

Hayes served as Chair of the Fine Gael parliamentary party from September 2002 to March 2010. He was party deputy spokesperson on Transport, with responsibility for Road Safety from October 2010 to March 2011.

On 5 June 2013, he was appointed by the Fine Gael–Labour government as Minister of State at the Department of Agriculture, Food and the Marine with responsibility for Forestry, Horticulture, the Greyhound Industry and Food Safety.

He lost his seat at the 2016 general election. He continued in office as a Minister of State until the formation of a new government on 6 May 2016.

Party political offices
| Preceded by Pádraic McCormack | Chair of the Fine Gael parliamentary party 2002–2010 | Succeeded by Pádraic McCormack |

| Dáil | Election | Deputy (Party) | Deputy (Party) | Deputy (Party) | Deputy (Party) |
|---|---|---|---|---|---|
| 13th | 1948 | Michael Davern (FF) | Richard Mulcahy (FG) | Dan Breen (FF) | John Timoney (CnaP) |
| 14th | 1951 | Michael Davern (FF) | Richard Mulcahy (FG) | Dan Breen (FF) | Patrick Crowe (FG) |
| 15th | 1954 | Michael Davern (FF) | Richard Mulcahy (FG) | Dan Breen (FF) | Patrick Crowe (FG) |
| 16th | 1957 | Michael Davern (FF) | Richard Mulcahy (FG) | Dan Breen (FF) | Frank Loughman (FF) |
| 17th | 1961 | Michael Davern (FF) | Patrick Hogan (FG) | Dan Breen (FF) | Seán Treacy (Note: Treacy served as Ceann Comhairle in the 20th Dáil from 1973 to 1977, and was returned automatically at the 1977 election. He lost the Labour party whip in February 1985.) (Lab) |
| 18th | 1965 | Don Davern (FF) | Patrick Hogan (FG) | Jackie Fahey (FF) | Seán Treacy (Lab) |
| 19th | 1969 | Noel Davern (FF) | Patrick Hogan (FG) | Jackie Fahey (FF) | Seán Treacy (Lab) |
| 20th | 1973 | Noel Davern (FF) | Brendan Griffin (FG) | Jackie Fahey (FF) | Seán Treacy (Lab) |
| 21st | 1977 | Noel Davern (FF) | Brendan Griffin (FG) | 3 seats 1977–1981 | Seán Treacy (Lab) |
| 22nd | 1981 | Carrie Acheson (FF) | Brendan Griffin (FG) | Seán McCarthy (FF) | Seán Treacy (Lab) |
| 23rd | 1982 (Feb) | Seán Byrne (FF) | Brendan Griffin (FG) | Seán McCarthy (FF) | Seán Treacy (Lab) |
| 24th | 1982 (Nov) | Seán Byrne (FF) | Brendan Griffin (FG) | Seán McCarthy (FF) | Seán Treacy (Lab) |
| 25th | 1987 | Noel Davern (FF) | Brendan Griffin (FG) | Seán McCarthy (FF) | Seán Treacy (Note: Treacy served as Ceann Comhairle in the 25th, 26th and 27th Dáil from 1987 to 1997, and was returned automatically at the 1989 and 1992 elections.) (Ind.) |
| 26th | 1989 | Noel Davern (FF) | Theresa Ahearn (FG) | Michael Ferris (Lab) | Seán Treacy (Ind.) |
| 27th | 1992 | Noel Davern (FF) | Theresa Ahearn (FG) | Michael Ferris (Lab) | Seán Treacy (Ind.) |
| 28th | 1997 | Noel Davern (FF) | Theresa Ahearn (FG) | Michael Ferris (Lab) | 3 seats from 1997 |
| 28th | 2000 by-election | Noel Davern (FF) | Theresa Ahearn (FG) | Séamus Healy (Ind.) | 3 seats from 1997 |
| 28th | 2001 by-election | Noel Davern (FF) | Tom Hayes (FG) | Séamus Healy (Ind.) | 3 seats from 1997 |
| 29th | 2002 | Noel Davern (FF) | Tom Hayes (FG) | Séamus Healy (Ind.) | 3 seats from 1997 |
| 30th | 2007 | Mattie McGrath (FF) | Tom Hayes (FG) | Martin Mansergh (FF) | 3 seats from 1997 |
| 31st | 2011 | Mattie McGrath (Ind.) | Tom Hayes (FG) | Séamus Healy (WUA) | 3 seats from 1997 |
| 32nd | 2016 | Constituency abolished. See Tipperary | | | |

| Dáil | Election | Deputy (Party) | Deputy (Party) | Deputy (Party) |
|---|---|---|---|---|
| 34th | 2024 | Mattie McGrath (Ind.) | Michael Murphy (FG) | Séamus Healy (Ind.) |
