= Seán Byrne (politician) =

Irish politician (1937–2018)

Senator
- In office 17 February 1993 – 17 September 1997
- Constituency: Nominated by the Taoiseach
- In office 25 April 1987 – 17 February 1993
- Constituency: Cultural and Educational Panel

Teachta Dála
- In office February 1982 – February 1987
- Constituency: Tipperary South

Personal details
- Born: 16 May 1937 County Tipperary, Ireland
- Died: 5 March 2018 (aged 80) County Tipperary, Ireland
- Party: Fianna Fáil

Seán Byrne (16 May 1937 – 5 March 2018) was an Irish Fianna Fáil politician.

== Career ==
A farmer before entering politics, he was unsuccessful on the first two occasions when he stood for election to Dáil Éireann, as a Fianna Fáil candidate in the Tipperary South constituency at the 1977 and 1981 general elections. He finally won a seat there at the February 1982 general election, and was re-elected at the November 1982 general election. At the 1987 general election he lost his seat to his Fianna Fáil colleague Noel Davern.

However, in the subsequent elections to the 18th Seanad Byrne was elected by the Cultural and Educational Panel. He did not contest the 1989 general election, but was re-elected to the 19th Seanad. In the 1992 general election he stood again in Tipperary South, but was not elected. He was defeated in the 1993 election to the 20th Seanad, but was instead nominated by the Taoiseach, Albert Reynolds.

He contested the 1997 Seanad election on the Administrative Panel, but failed to win a seat and did not stand again.

== Death ==
On 5 March 2018, he died after a long illness. Fianna Fáil leader Micheál Martin said, "The Fianna Fáil organisation, locally in Tipperary and nationally, has lost a loyal and valued member and supporter."

Dáil	Election	Deputy (Party)	Deputy (Party)	Deputy (Party)	Deputy (Party)
13th	1948	Michael Davern (FF)	Richard Mulcahy (FG)	Dan Breen (FF)	John Timoney (CnaP)
14th	1951	Michael Davern (FF)	Richard Mulcahy (FG)	Dan Breen (FF)	Patrick Crowe (FG)
15th	1954	Michael Davern (FF)	Richard Mulcahy (FG)	Dan Breen (FF)	Patrick Crowe (FG)
16th	1957	Michael Davern (FF)	Richard Mulcahy (FG)	Dan Breen (FF)	Frank Loughman (FF)
17th	1961	Michael Davern (FF)	Patrick Hogan (FG)	Dan Breen (FF)	Seán Treacy (Note: Treacy served as Ceann Comhairle in the 20th Dáil from 1973 to 1977, and was returned automatically at the 1977 election. He lost the Labour party whip in February 1985.) (Lab)
18th	1965	Don Davern (FF)	Patrick Hogan (FG)	Jackie Fahey (FF)	Seán Treacy (Lab)
19th	1969	Noel Davern (FF)	Patrick Hogan (FG)	Jackie Fahey (FF)	Seán Treacy (Lab)
20th	1973	Noel Davern (FF)	Brendan Griffin (FG)	Jackie Fahey (FF)	Seán Treacy (Lab)
21st	1977	Noel Davern (FF)	Brendan Griffin (FG)	3 seats 1977–1981	Seán Treacy (Lab)
22nd	1981	Carrie Acheson (FF)	Brendan Griffin (FG)	Seán McCarthy (FF)	Seán Treacy (Lab)
23rd	1982 (Feb)	Seán Byrne (FF)	Brendan Griffin (FG)	Seán McCarthy (FF)	Seán Treacy (Lab)
24th	1982 (Nov)	Seán Byrne (FF)	Brendan Griffin (FG)	Seán McCarthy (FF)	Seán Treacy (Lab)
25th	1987	Noel Davern (FF)	Brendan Griffin (FG)	Seán McCarthy (FF)	Seán Treacy (Note: Treacy served as Ceann Comhairle in the 25th, 26th and 27th Dáil from 1987 to 1997, and was returned automatically at the 1989 and 1992 elections.) (Ind.)
26th	1989	Noel Davern (FF)	Theresa Ahearn (FG)	Michael Ferris (Lab)	Seán Treacy (Ind.)
27th	1992	Noel Davern (FF)	Theresa Ahearn (FG)	Michael Ferris (Lab)	Seán Treacy (Ind.)
28th	1997	Noel Davern (FF)	Theresa Ahearn (FG)	Michael Ferris (Lab)	3 seats from 1997
28th	2000 by-election	Noel Davern (FF)	Theresa Ahearn (FG)	Séamus Healy (Ind.)	3 seats from 1997
28th	2001 by-election	Noel Davern (FF)	Tom Hayes (FG)	Séamus Healy (Ind.)	3 seats from 1997
29th	2002	Noel Davern (FF)	Tom Hayes (FG)	Séamus Healy (Ind.)	3 seats from 1997
30th	2007	Mattie McGrath (FF)	Tom Hayes (FG)	Martin Mansergh (FF)	3 seats from 1997
31st	2011	Mattie McGrath (Ind.)	Tom Hayes (FG)	Séamus Healy (WUA)	3 seats from 1997
32nd	2016	Constituency abolished. See Tipperary			

Dáil	Election	Deputy (Party)	Deputy (Party)	Deputy (Party)
34th	2024	Mattie McGrath (Ind.)	Michael Murphy (FG)	Séamus Healy (Ind.)
