= Tipperary South (Dáil constituency) =

Dáil constituency (1948–2016, 2024–present)

- Dáil constituency
- Location of Tipperary South within Ireland
- Interactive map of constituency boundaries since the 2024 general election
- Major settlements: Cahir; Carrick-on-Suir; Cashel; Clonmel; Tipperary

Current constituency
- Created: 2024
- Seats: 3
- TDs: Séamus Healy (Ind); Mattie McGrath (Ind); Michael Murphy (FG)
- Local government area: County Tipperary
- Created from: Tipperary

Tipperary South
- Former Dáil constituency

Former constituency
- Created: 1948
- Abolished: 2016
- Seats: 4 (1948–1977); 3 (1977–1981); 4 (1981–1997); 3 (1997–2016)
- Local government areas: South Tipperary; County Waterford
- Created from: Tipperary
- Replaced by: Tipperary

Tipperary South is a parliamentary constituency represented in Dáil Éireann, the lower house of the Irish parliament or Oireachtas. The constituency elects three deputies (Teachtaí Dála, commonly known as TDs) on the system of proportional representation by means of the single transferable vote (PR-STV).

== History and boundaries ==
At the 1948 general election, the former constituency of Tipperary was divided into Tipperary North and Tipperary South. Tipperary South was primarily based around the former county of South Tipperary. The principal population centres were Tipperary, Clonmel, Cashel, Carrick-on-Suir, and Cahir. The counties of North Tipperary and South Tipperary were abolished in 2014, and succeeded by County Tipperary.

The constituency of Tipperary South was abolished at the 2016 general election and replaced by the new Tipperary constituency.

In 2023, the Electoral Commission recommended the establishment of a new three-seat constituency of Tipperary South.

For the 2024 general election, the Electoral (Amendment) Act 2023 defines the constituency as:

"The county of Tipperary except the part thereof which is comprised in the constituency of Tipperary North."

Changes to the Tipperary South constituency 1948–2016
Years	TDs	Boundaries	Notes
1948–1961	4	Tipperary South Riding	Created from Tipperary
1961–1977	4	Tipperary South Riding, except the part in the constituency of Tipperary North and and in County Waterford the district electoral divisions of: Ballymacarbry, Graignagower, Gurteen, Kilmacomma, Kilronan, St. Mary's, in the former Rural District of Clonmel No. 2; Dromana, Dromore, in the former Rural District of Dungarvan; Ballyduff, Ballyhane, Bally in, Ballynamult, Ballysaggartmore, Cappoquin, Castlerichard, Drumroe, Gortnapeaky, Kilcockan, Kilwatermoy East, Kilwatermoy West, Lismore Rural, Lismore Urban, Mocollop, Modelligo, Tallow, in the former Rural District of Lismore; Templemichael, in the former Rural District of Youghal No. 2.	Transfer to Tipperary North of the district electoral divisions of: Clonoulty East, in the former Rural District of Cashel; Buolick, Fennor, Kilcooly, New Birmingham, Poyntstown, in the former Rural District of Slievardagh; and transfer from Waterford of the district electoral divisions of: Ballymacarbry, Graignagower, Gurteen, Kilmacomma, Kilronan, St. Mary's, in the former Rural District of Clonmel No. 2; Dromana, Dromore, in the former Rural District of Dungarvan; Ballyduff, Ballyhane, Bally in, Ballynamult, Ballysaggartmore, Cappoquin, Castlerichard, Drumroe, Gortnapeaky, Kilcockan, Kilwatermoy East, Kilwatermoy West, Lismore Rural, Lismore Urban, Mocollop, Modelligo, Tallow, in the former Rural District of Lismore; Templemichael, in the former Rural District of Youghal No. 2.
1977–1981	3	Tipperary South Riding, except the part in the constituency of Tipperary North	Transfer to North Tipperary of the district electoral divisions of: Ballysheehan, Gaile, Graystown, Killenaule, Nodstown, in the former Rural District of Cashel; Ballingarry, Ballyphilip, Crohane, Farranrory, Modeshil, in the former Rural District of Slievardagh; and Transfer to Waterford of the district electoral divisions of: Ballymacarbry, Graignagower, Gurteen, Kilmacomma, Kilronan, St. Mary's, in the former Rural District of Clonmel No. 2; Dromana, Dromore, in the former Rural District of Dungarvan; Ballyduff, Ballyhane, Bally in, Ballynamult, Ballysaggartmore, Cappoquin, Castlerichard, Drumroe, Gortnapeaky, Kilcockan, Kilwatermoy East, Kilwatermoy West, Lismore Rural, Lismore Urban, Mocollop, Modelligo, Tallow, in the former Rural District of Lismore; Templemichael, in the former Rural District of Youghal No. 2.
1981–1997	4	Tipperary South Riding, and in County Waterford the district electoral divisions of: Ballymacarbery, Graignagower, Gurteen, Kilmacomma, Kilronan, St. Mary's in the former Rural District of Clonmel No. 2.	Transfer from North Tipperary of the district electoral divisions of: Ballysheehan, Gaile, Graystown, Killenaule, Nodstown, in the former Rural District of Cashel; Ballingarry, Ballyphilip, Crohane, Farranrory, Modeshil, in the former Rural District of Slievardagh; and transfer from the constituency of Waterford of the district electoral divisions of: Ballymacarbery, Graignagower, Gurteen, Kilmacomma, Kilronan, St. Mary's in the former Rural District of Clonmel No. 2.
1997–2016	3	Tipperary South Riding, except the part in Tipperary North and in County Waterford in the former Rural District of Clonmel No. 2, the electoral divisions of: Kilmacomma, Kilronan, and the townlands of: Barravakeen, Bawnard, Boola, Carrickabrone, Coolishal, Derrinlaur Lower, Derrinlaur Upper, Glendaw, Gurteen Lower, Gurteen Upper, Lisheen, Tikincor Lower, Tikincor Upper, in the electoral division of Gurteen; and the townlands of: Croan Lower, Croan Upper, Glenary, Glennagad, Kilgainy Lower, Kilgainy Upper, Knocklucas, Knocknagriffin, Lyranearla, Monacalee, Poulboy, Poulnagunoge, Scrothea East, Scrothea West, Spa, in the electoral division of St. Mary's.	Transfer to North Tipperary of the electoral divisions of: Ballysheehan, Clogher, Clonoulty East, Clonoulty West, Gaile, Graystown, Killenaule, Nodstown, in the former Rural District of Cashel; Ballyphilip, Buolick, Crohane, Farranrory, Fennor, Kilcooly, New Birmingham, Poyntstown, in the former Rural District of Slievardagh. Cappagh, Curraheen, Donohill, Glengar, in the former Rural District of Tipperary No. 1. with transfer of territory to the constituency of Waterford
2016	—	Constituency abolished	Portion in County Waterford transferred to the constituency of Waterford; remainder formed part of the new constituency of Tipperary

== TDs ==
=== TDs 1948–2016 ===
Teachtaí Dála (TDs) for Tipperary South 1948–2016
Key to parties: CnaP = Clann na Poblachta; FF = Fianna Fáil; FG = Fine Gael; Ind. = Independent; Lab = Labour; WUA = Workers and Unemployed
Dáil	Election	Deputy (Party)	Deputy (Party)	Deputy (Party)	Deputy (Party)
13th	1948	Michael Davern (FF)	Richard Mulcahy (FG)	Dan Breen (FF)	John Timoney (CnaP)
14th	1951	Michael Davern (FF)	Richard Mulcahy (FG)	Dan Breen (FF)	Patrick Crowe (FG)
15th	1954	Michael Davern (FF)	Richard Mulcahy (FG)	Dan Breen (FF)	Patrick Crowe (FG)
16th	1957	Michael Davern (FF)	Richard Mulcahy (FG)	Dan Breen (FF)	Frank Loughman (FF)
17th	1961	Michael Davern (FF)	Patrick Hogan (FG)	Dan Breen (FF)	Seán Treacy (Note: Treacy served as Ceann Comhairle in the 20th Dáil from 1973 to 1977, and was returned automatically at the 1977 election. He lost the Labour party whip in February 1985.) (Lab)
18th	1965	Don Davern (FF)	Patrick Hogan (FG)	Jackie Fahey (FF)	Seán Treacy (Lab)
19th	1969	Noel Davern (FF)	Patrick Hogan (FG)	Jackie Fahey (FF)	Seán Treacy (Lab)
20th	1973	Noel Davern (FF)	Brendan Griffin (FG)	Jackie Fahey (FF)	Seán Treacy (Lab)
21st	1977	Noel Davern (FF)	Brendan Griffin (FG)	3 seats 1977–1981	Seán Treacy (Lab)
22nd	1981	Carrie Acheson (FF)	Brendan Griffin (FG)	Seán McCarthy (FF)	Seán Treacy (Lab)
23rd	1982 (Feb)	Seán Byrne (FF)	Brendan Griffin (FG)	Seán McCarthy (FF)	Seán Treacy (Lab)
24th	1982 (Nov)	Seán Byrne (FF)	Brendan Griffin (FG)	Seán McCarthy (FF)	Seán Treacy (Lab)
25th	1987	Noel Davern (FF)	Brendan Griffin (FG)	Seán McCarthy (FF)	Seán Treacy (Note: Treacy served as Ceann Comhairle in the 25th, 26th and 27th Dáil from 1987 to 1997, and was returned automatically at the 1989 and 1992 elections.) (Ind.)
26th	1989	Noel Davern (FF)	Theresa Ahearn (FG)	Michael Ferris (Lab)	Seán Treacy (Ind.)
27th	1992	Noel Davern (FF)	Theresa Ahearn (FG)	Michael Ferris (Lab)	Seán Treacy (Ind.)
28th	1997	Noel Davern (FF)	Theresa Ahearn (FG)	Michael Ferris (Lab)	3 seats from 1997
28th	2000 by-election	Noel Davern (FF)	Theresa Ahearn (FG)	Séamus Healy (Ind.)	3 seats from 1997
28th	2001 by-election	Noel Davern (FF)	Tom Hayes (FG)	Séamus Healy (Ind.)	3 seats from 1997
29th	2002	Noel Davern (FF)	Tom Hayes (FG)	Séamus Healy (Ind.)	3 seats from 1997
30th	2007	Mattie McGrath (FF)	Tom Hayes (FG)	Martin Mansergh (FF)	3 seats from 1997
31st	2011	Mattie McGrath (Ind.)	Tom Hayes (FG)	Séamus Healy (WUA)	3 seats from 1997
32nd	2016	Constituency abolished. See Tipperary			

Note: The columns in this table are used only for presentational purposes, and no significance should be attached to the order of columns. For details of the order in which seats were won at each election, see the detailed results of that election.

=== TDs since 2024 ===
Teachtaí Dála (TDs) for Tipperary South 2024–
Key to parties: FG = Fine Gael; Ind. = Independent
Dáil	Election	Deputy (Party)	Deputy (Party)	Deputy (Party)
34th	2024	Mattie McGrath (Ind.)	Michael Murphy (FG)	Séamus Healy (Ind.)

Note: The columns in this table are used only for presentational purposes, and no significance should be attached to the order of columns. For details of the order in which seats were won at each election, see the detailed results of that election.

== Elections ==
*: Outgoing TD

=== 2024 general election ===
2024 general election: Tipperary South
Party	Candidate	FPv%	Count					
Party	Candidate	FPv%	1	2	3	4	5	6
Independent	Mattie McGrath	24.4	10,014	10,592				
Fine Gael	Michael Murphy	20.4	8,371	8,555	8,912	10,009	10,056	10,415
Fianna Fáil	Imelda Goldsboro	14.2	5,838	5,965	6,506	7,219	7,271	7,848
Sinn Féin	Martin Browne	12.0	4,937	5,110	5,468	6,183	6,237	
Independent	Séamus Healy (Note: Healy was a member of Workers and Unemployed Action but stood as an independent candidate.)	11.7	4,795	4,971	5,393	6,147	6,316	9,601
Independent	John O'Heney	9.0	3,692	3,846	3,978			
Labour	Michael Brennan	4.2	1,731	1,970				
Green	Myriam Madigan	1.4	584					
Aontú	Rosemary McGlone	1.2	486					
National Party	John McGrath	0.8	316					
Independent Ireland	Nadaline Webster	0.4	161					
Independent	Bill Fitzgerald	0.4	154					
Electorate: 68,247 Valid: 41,079 Spoilt: 284 Quota: 10,270 Turnout: 60.6%

=== 2011 general election ===
2011 general election: Tipperary South
Party	Candidate	FPv%	Count				
Party	Candidate	FPv%	1	2	3	4	5
Fine Gael	Tom Hayes	21.5	8,896	9,214	10,186	10,463	
Workers and Unemployed	Séamus Healy (Note: Healy campaigned as a member of the United Left Alliance.)	21.3	8,818	9,542	11,265		
Independent	Mattie McGrath	14.7	6,074	6,349	7,078	7,413	9,978
Fianna Fáil	Martin Mansergh	13.1	5,419	5,588	5,865	5,948	
Fine Gael	Michael Murphy	13.1	5,402	5,563	6,404	6,633	7,948
Labour	Phil Prendergast	10.9	4,525	4,966			
Sinn Féin	Michael Browne	4.5	1,860				
Green	Paul McNally	0.9	367				
Electorate: 57,420 Valid: 41,361 Spoilt: 432 (1.0%) Quota: 10,341 Turnout: 41,793 (72.8%)

=== 2007 general election ===
2007 general election: Tipperary South
Party	Candidate	FPv%	Count							
Party	Candidate	FPv%	1	2	3	4	5	6	7	8
Fine Gael	Tom Hayes	21.1	8,200	8,386	8,823	9,070	10,518			
Fianna Fáil	Mattie McGrath	19.6	7,608	7,711	7,811	7,994	8,463	10,093		
Fianna Fáil	Martin Mansergh	15.8	6,110	6,261	6,406	6,528	6,752	8,813	9,028	9,341
Independent	Séamus Healy	14.7	5,707	5,884	6,036	6,456	7,548	8,591	9,198	9,282
Fianna Fáil	Siobhán Ambrose	11.1	4,286	4,414	4,497	4,649	5,097			
Labour	Phil Prendergast	8.8	3,400	3,631	3,752	3,907				
Sinn Féin	Liam Browne	3.1	1,198	1,266	1,363					
Independent	Tom Wood	2.9	1,141	1,187						
Green	Bernard Lennon	1.5	591							
Progressive Democrats	Richie Molloy	0.9	364							
Progressive Democrats	Peadar O'Donnell	0.5	177							
Electorate: 54,637 Valid: 38,782 Spoilt: 330 (0.8%) Quota: 9,696 Turnout: 39,112 (71.6%)

=== 2002 general election ===
2002 general election: Tipperary South
Party	Candidate	FPv%	Count		
Party	Candidate	FPv%	1	2	3
Fine Gael	Tom Hayes	24.5	8,997	9,133	10,724
Fianna Fáil	Noel Davern	24.2	8,888	9,085	10,029
Independent	Séamus Healy	20.1	7,350	7,765	9,477
Fianna Fáil	Martin Mansergh	14.3	5,233	5,433	5,888
Labour	Denis Landy	9.1	3,353	3,555	
Independent	Tom Wood	4.1	1,515	1,631	
Sinn Féin	Muiris Ó Suilleabháin	3.3	1,210		
Christian Solidarity	Michael Larkin	0.3	120		
Electorate: 56,092 Valid: 36,666 Spoilt: 390 (1.1%) Quota: 9,167 Turnout: 37,056 (66.1%)

=== 2001 by-election ===
Fine Gael TD Theresa Ahearn died on 20 September 2000. A by-election was held to fill the vacancy on 30 June 2001.

2001 by-election: Tipperary South
Party	Candidate	FPv%	Count		
Party	Candidate	FPv%	1	2	3
Fine Gael	Tom Hayes	35.9	11,446	12,513	15,791
Fianna Fáil	Michael Maguire	26.5	8,461	9,251	
Independent	Phil Prendergast	24.8	7,897	9,376	12,891
Labour	Denis Landy	12.9	4,103		
Electorate: 54,542 Valid: 31,907 Quota: 15,954 Turnout: (58.5%)

=== 2000 by-election ===
Labour Party TD Michael Ferris died on 20 March 2000. A by-election was held to fill the vacancy on 22 June 2000.

2000 by-election: Tipperary South
Party	Candidate	FPv%	Count		
Party	Candidate	FPv%	1	2	3
Independent	Séamus Healy	30.8	9,419	11,169	13,982
Fine Gael	Tom Hayes	26.8	8,184	10,718	13,449
Fianna Fáil	Barry O'Brien	22.8	6,959	8,056	
Labour	Ellen Ferris	16.8	5,133		
Christian Solidarity	Mary Heaney	2.6	784		
Natural Law	Raymond McInerney	0.3	97		
Electorate: 52,740 Valid: 30,576 Quota: 15,289 Turnout: 58.0%

=== 1997 general election ===
1997 general election: Tipperary South
Party	Candidate	FPv%	Count				
Party	Candidate	FPv%	1	2	3	4	5
Fianna Fáil	Noel Davern	25.5	8,995				
Fine Gael	Theresa Ahearn	24.1	8,494	8,513	9,117		
Independent	Séamus Healy	16.5	5,814	5,833	6,168	7,551	7,614
Labour	Michael Ferris	16.1	5,681	5,693	6,028	7,811	8,049
Fianna Fáil	Michael Maguire	11.8	4,151	4,275	4,920		
National Party	John Harold-Barry	6.0	2,125	2,130			
Electorate: 51,925 Valid: 35,260 Spoilt: 374 (1.1%) Quota: 8,816 Turnout: 35,634 (68.6%)

=== 1992 general election ===
Seán Treacy was Ceann Comhairle at the dissolution of the 26th Dáil and therefore deemed to be returned automatically. The constituency was treated as a three-seater for the purposes of calculating the quota.

1992 general election: Tipperary South
Party	Candidate	FPv%	Count				
Party	Candidate	FPv%	1	2	3	4	5
Independent	Seán Treacy	N/A	Returned automatically				
Labour	Michael Ferris	20.9	8,306	8,466	9,148	9,245	9,727
Fine Gael	Theresa Ahearn	20.4	8,103	8,298	10,065		
Fianna Fáil	Noel Davern	18.8	7,463	7,691	7,842	7,860	10,117
Independent	Séamus Healy	10.1	4,023	4,191	4,270	4,278	4,440
Fianna Fáil	Seán Byrne	9.7	3,851	3,951	4,022	4,033	
Fianna Fáil	Seán McCarthy	9.7	3,849	3,963	4,108	4,121	5,060
Fine Gael	Brendan Griffin	7.2	2,854	2,975			
Independent	Joe O'Gorman	2.6	1,016				
Sinn Féin	Terry Crowe	0.5	205				
Electorate: 56,800 Valid: 39,670 Spoilt: 533 (1.3%) Quota: 9,918 Turnout: 40,203 (70.8%)

=== 1989 general election ===
Seán Treacy was Ceann Comhairle at the dissolution of the 25th Dáil and therefore deemed to be returned automatically. The constituency was treated as a three-seater for the purposes of calculating the quota.

1989 general election: Tipperary South
Party	Candidate	FPv%	Count				
Party	Candidate	FPv%	1	2	3	4	5
Independent	Seán Treacy	N/A	Returned automatically				
Fianna Fáil	Noel Davern	24.3	9,497	9,645	10,463		
Fianna Fáil	Seán McCarthy	18.8	7,360	7,432	7,628	7,956	8,355
Labour	Michael Ferris	18.1	7,080	7,250	8,209	8,354	9,480
Fine Gael	Brendan Griffin	14.4	5,648	5,915	6,077	6,115	
Fine Gael	Theresa Ahearn	13.9	5,462	5,933	6,342	6,482	10,724
Independent	Séamus Healy	7.3	2,859	2,923			
Progressive Democrats	Thomas Lonergan	3.0	1,171				
Independent	William Fitzsimon	0.2	93				
Electorate: 54,734 Valid: 39,170 Quota: 9,793 Turnout: 71.6%

=== 1987 general election ===
1987 general election: Tipperary South
Party	Candidate	FPv%	Count							
Party	Candidate	FPv%	1	2	3	4	5	6	7	8
Fianna Fáil	Seán McCarthy	16.6	6,877	6,932	7,030	7,089	7,331	7,891	8,221	8,636
Fianna Fáil	Noel Davern	13.0	5,412	5,455	5,651	5,714	6,122	6,567	6,897	7,591
Fianna Fáil	Seán Byrne	12.9	5,372	5,397	5,500	5,651	5,913	6,381	6,601	7,034
Independent	Seán Treacy	12.4	5,126	5,244	5,921	6,081	6,809	7,962	8,327	
Fine Gael	Brendan Griffin	10.9	4,542	4,563	4,605	4,783	5,693	6,642	10,295	
Fine Gael	John Crowe	9.5	3,938	3,965	3,997	4,132	4,683	5,178		
Labour	Michael Ferris	9.2	3,820	3,911	4,088	4,156	4,539			
Progressive Democrats	Anthony Kehoe	6.1	2,524	2,556	2,644	3,745				
Progressive Democrats	Thomas Lonergan	4.5	1,878	1,892	1,928					
Independent	Séamus Healy	3.5	1,457	1,554						
Workers' Party	Seán Hill	1.0	407							
Independent	Nicholas Quigley	0.2	76							
Independent	Patrick Ryan	0.2	72							
Electorate: 55,055 Valid: 41,501 Quota: 8,301 Turnout: 75.4%

=== November 1982 general election ===
November 1982 general election: Tipperary South
Party	Candidate	FPv%	Count		
Party	Candidate	FPv%	1	2	3
Fianna Fáil	Seán Byrne	20.1	8,080		
Labour	Seán Treacy	20.0	8,050	8,436	
Fianna Fáil	Seán McCarthy	17.4	6,996	7,136	10,160
Fine Gael	Brendan Griffin	17.1	6,905	7,954	8,157
Fine Gael	Michael Fitzgerald	10.9	4,407	4,967	5,209
Fianna Fáil	Tom Ambrose	9.0	3,634	3,693	
Fine Gael	Anthony Kehoe	5.5	2,215		
Electorate: 53,207 Valid: 40,287 Quota: 8,058 Turnout: 75.7%

=== February 1982 general election ===
February 1982 general election: Tipperary South
Party	Candidate	FPv%	Count			
Party	Candidate	FPv%	1	2	3	4
Fianna Fáil	Seán Byrne	22.0	8,705			
Labour	Seán Treacy	19.6	7,758	7,847	8,089	
Fine Gael	Brendan Griffin	18.8	7,434	7,463	8,229	
Fianna Fáil	Seán McCarthy	14.4	5,711	6,040	6,079	6,971
Fianna Fáil	Carrie Acheson	12.0	4,751	5,054	5,186	6,014
Fine Gael	Michael Fitzgerald	8.0	3,180	3,203	4,039	
Fine Gael	Terence Darmody	4.8	1,883	1,895		
Independent	William Fitzsimon	0.4	158	161		
Electorate: 52,217 Valid: 39,580 Quota: 7,917 Turnout: 75.8%

=== 1981 general election ===
1981 general election: Tipperary South
Party	Candidate	FPv%	Count						
Party	Candidate	FPv%	1	2	3	4	5	6	7
Labour	Seán Treacy	21.5	8,989						
Fine Gael	Brendan Griffin	15.8	6,590	6,746	7,297	8,230	10,296		
Fianna Fáil	Carrie Acheson	14.0	5,838	5,947	5,982	6,171	6,244	6,311	7,228
Fianna Fáil	Seán Byrne	13.7	5,737	5,792	5,811	5,852	5,967	6,003	6,856
Fianna Fáil	Seán McCarthy	13.7	5,716	5,776	5,818	5,840	6,098	6,266	7,486
Independent	T. J. Maher	8.9	3,728	3,791	3,908	4,067	4,581	5,623	
Fine Gael	John Crowe	6.2	2,596	2,640	2,851	3,197			
Fine Gael	Terence Darmody	3.4	1,413	1,524	1,725				
Fine Gael	Louise Farrell	2.7	1,144	1,184					
Electorate: 52,217 Valid: 41,751 Quota: 8,351 Turnout: 79.0%

=== 1977 general election ===
Seán Treacy was Ceann Comhairle at the dissolution of the 20th Dáil and therefore deemed to be returned automatically. The constituency was treated as a two-seater for the purposes of calculating the quota.

1977 general election: Tipperary South
Party	Candidate	FPv%	Count				
Party	Candidate	FPv%	1	2	3	4	5
Labour	Seán Treacy	N/A	Returned automatically				
Fianna Fáil	Noel Davern	34.8	11,715				
Fianna Fáil	Seán Byrne	19.0	6,412	6,841	6,934	7,274	8,378
Fine Gael	Brendan Griffin	18.7	6,298	6,312	6,359	8,706	12,869
Labour	Michael Ferris	16.2	5,462	5,493	5,634	6,241	
Fine Gael	Hubert Burke	10.1	3,400	3,414	3,452		
Independent	Patrick Leahy	0.8	275	278			
Independent	Paschal Ryan	0.3	104	105			
Electorate: 42,521 Valid: 33,666 Spoilt: 287 Quota: 11,223 Turnout: 79.2%

=== 1973 general election ===
1973 general election: Tipperary South
Party	Candidate	FPv%	Count			
Party	Candidate	FPv%	1	2	3	4
Labour	Seán Treacy	20.6	7,611			
Fianna Fáil	Jackie Fahey	19.8	7,317	7,386	7,533	
Fianna Fáil	Noel Davern	16.5	6,117	6,197	6,391	6,679
Fine Gael	Brendan Griffin	15.6	5,777	7,008	10,369	
Fianna Fáil	William Ryan	13.0	4,793	4,841	4,882	4,990
Fine Gael	Terence Darmody	8.1	2,982	3,882		
Fine Gael	Michael Smyth	6.4	2,360			
Electorate: 46,127 Valid: 36,957 Quota: 7,392 Turnout: 80.1%

=== 1969 general election ===
1969 general election: Tipperary South
Party	Candidate	FPv%	Count					
Party	Candidate	FPv%	1	2	3	4	5	6
Fianna Fáil	Noel Davern	25.2	9,357					
Fine Gael	Patrick Hogan	17.5	6,499	6,587	6,688	6,824	7,901	
Fianna Fáil	Jackie Fahey	16.5	6,098	7,306	7,344	7,640		
Labour	Seán Treacy	13.4	4,955	5,029	5,589	6,018	6,221	7,234
Fianna Fáil	William Ryan	10.1	3,742	4,204	4,241	4,285	4,339	4,869
Fine Gael	Brendan Griffin	7.7	2,871	2,911	2,926	2,979	3,398	
Fine Gael	Peter Powell	4.6	1,705	1,718	1,738	1,815		
Independent	Seán Healy	2.9	1,073	1,092	1,105			
Labour	Patrick O'Brien	2.1	770	808				
Electorate: 45,873 Valid: 37,070 Quota: 7,415 Turnout: 80.8%

=== 1965 general election ===
1965 general election: Tipperary South
Party	Candidate	FPv%	Count				
Party	Candidate	FPv%	1	2	3	4	5
Fianna Fáil	Don Davern	23.2	8,540				
Labour	Seán Treacy	19.0	7,005	7,091	7,485		
Fianna Fáil	Jackie Fahey	12.5	4,595	5,222	5,298	9,075	
Fine Gael	Denis Burke	12.0	4,433	4,453	5,227	5,405	5,621
Fine Gael	Patrick Hogan	11.8	4,359	4,419	6,286	6,827	7,199
Fianna Fáil	William Ryan	11.8	4,340	4,686	5,091		
Fine Gael	Timothy O'Donoghue	9.7	3,560	3,594			
Electorate: 46,703 Valid: 36,832 Quota: 7,367 Turnout: 78.9%

=== 1961 general election ===
1961 general election: Tipperary South
Party	Candidate	FPv%	Count					
Party	Candidate	FPv%	1	2	3	4	5	6
Labour	Seán Treacy	19.5	7,260	7,486				
Fianna Fáil	Michael Davern	16.3	6,070	6,194	6,694	8,135		
Fine Gael	Patrick Hogan	15.5	5,787	5,933	5,992	6,079	6,181	8,031
Fianna Fáil	Dan Breen	15.3	5,717	5,852	6,391	7,604		
Fine Gael	Michael Fitzgerald	10.4	3,864	3,920	3,936	3,991	4,054	5,663
Fine Gael	Denis Burke	9.3	3,465	3,481	3,532	3,701	3,847	
Fianna Fáil	Jackie Fahey	7.0	2,625	2,639	3,144			
Fianna Fáil	Frank Loughman	4.5	1,689	1,707				
Sinn Féin	Pilib Ó Cinneide	2.2	834					
Electorate: 46,785 Valid: 37,311 Quota: 7,463 Turnout: 79.8%

=== 1957 general election ===
1957 general election: Tipperary South
Party	Candidate	FPv%	Count				
Party	Candidate	FPv%	1	2	3	4	5
Fianna Fáil	Michael Davern	22.4	7,563				
Fianna Fáil	Dan Breen	18.9	6,359	6,428	6,841		
Fianna Fáil	Frank Loughman	13.6	4,579	4,659	4,962	6,257	6,348
Fine Gael	Patrick Crowe	13.2	4,456	4,974	5,027	6,218	6,225
Fine Gael	Richard Mulcahy	13.1	4,407	5,336	5,353	6,556	6,557
Labour	Seán Treacy	12.9	4,352	4,728	4,763		
Fine Gael	John Morrissey	5.9	1,990				
Electorate: 42,999 Valid: 33,706 Quota: 6,742 Turnout: 78.4%

=== 1954 general election ===
1954 general election: Tipperary South
Party	Candidate	FPv%	Count					
Party	Candidate	FPv%	1	2	3	4	5	6
Fianna Fáil	Dan Breen	23.0	8,291					
Fianna Fáil	Michael Davern	19.2	6,941	7,663				
Fine Gael	Patrick Crowe	15.3	5,513	5,595	5,610	5,688	6,464	7,521
Fine Gael	Richard Mulcahy	13.4	4,828	4,841	4,842	4,931	5,388	7,588
Fianna Fáil	Michael Lacey	11.0	3,962	4,148	4,539	4,702	5,201	5,516
Fine Gael	John Morrissey	8.8	3,171	3,182	3,191	3,403	3,883	
Labour	Patrick Walsh	4.8	1,727	1,762	1,776	2,914		
Labour	Michael Kilkelly	4.7	1,695	1,711	1,718			
Electorate: 43,783 Valid: 36,128 Quota: 7,226 Turnout: 82.5%

=== 1951 general election ===
1951 general election: Tipperary South
Party	Candidate	FPv%	Count								
Party	Candidate	FPv%	1	2	3	4	5	6	7	8	9
Fianna Fáil	Dan Breen	18.5	6,842	6,873	6,999	7,078	7,304	7,392			
Fianna Fáil	Michael Davern	18.5	6,833	6,863	6,936	7,001	7,151	7,225	7,254	8,215	
Fine Gael	Richard Mulcahy	15.6	5,745	5,791	6,098	6,167	6,971	8,874			
Fianna Fáil	Frank Loughman	13.6	5,019	5,030	5,055	5,146	5,226	5,336	5,382	5,719	6,113
Fine Gael	Patrick Crowe	6.5	2,384	2,459	2,710	2,726	3,300	3,652	4,839	6,129	6,265
Fine Gael	John Morrissey	6.2	2,272	2,286	2,390	2,532	2,780				
Labour	Patrick Walsh	5.9	2,182	2,209	2,579	3,790	3,929	4,104	4,336		
Independent	Colm O'Donnell	5.1	1,892	2,236	2,389	2,410					
Labour	Michael Kilkelly	4.3	1,585	1,594	1,713						
Clann na Poblachta	John Timoney	4.1	1,506	1,555							
Independent	George Furlong	1.7	638								
Electorate: 44,749 Valid: 36,898 Quota: 7,380 Turnout: 82.5%

=== 1948 general election ===
1948 general election: Tipperary South
Party	Candidate	FPv%	Count										
Party	Candidate	FPv%	1	2	3	4	5	6	7	8	9	10	11
Fianna Fáil	Dan Breen	21.8	7,931										
Fianna Fáil	Michael Davern	17.0	6,176	6,602	6,626	6,670	6,894	6,956	6,962	7,534			
Fine Gael	Richard Mulcahy	14.4	5,225	5,231	5,280	5,327	5,947	7,408					
Fianna Fáil	Frank Loughman	10.8	3,909	4,035	4,047	4,092	4,120	4,230	4,243	4,434	4,631	4,816	5,431
Clann na Talmhan	Michael Fitzgerald	9.0	3,257	3,280	3,296	3,305	3,607	3,692	3,749	3,876	3,904	3,998	
Clann na Poblachta	John Timoney	5.3	1,914	1,929	2,093	2,137	2,250	2,319	2,338	2,730	2,756	4,645	5,996
Clann na Poblachta	Denis O'Driscoll	4.6	1,674	1,680	2,065	2,125	2,138	2,214	2,241	2,625	2,642		
Fine Gael	Patrick Crowe	4.5	1,626	1,660	1,667	1,671							
Fine Gael	John Morrissey	4.4	1,587	1,595	1,616	1,695	2,003						
Labour	Denis O'Sullivan	4.1	1,487	1,500	1,533	2,024	2,057	2,125	2,145				
Labour	Richard Stapleton	2.3	821	826	834								
Clann na Poblachta	John Murray	2.0	722	725									
Electorate: 45,797 Valid: 36,329 Quota: 7,266 Turnout: 79.3%
