= Denis Landy =

Irish politician (born 1962)

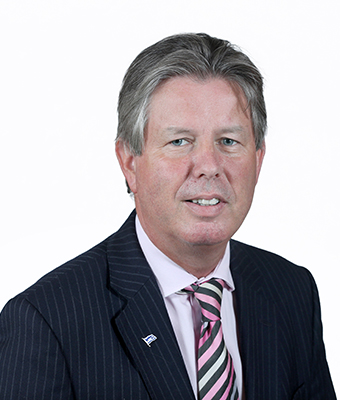

Senator
- In office 8 June 2016 – 28 November 2017
- Constituency: Agricultural Panel
- In office 25 May 2011 – 8 June 2016
- Constituency: Administrative Panel

Personal details
- Born: 28 February 1962 (age 64) Carrick-on-Suir, County Tipperary, Ireland
- Party: Labour Party
- Education: University College Cork

Denis Landy (born 28 February 1962) is an Irish former Labour Party politician who served as a Senator for the Agricultural Panel from 2016 to 2017 and previously for the Administrative Panel from 2011 to 2016.

He was a member of South Tipperary County Council from 1991 to 2011 for the Fethard local electoral area, and was also a member of Carrick-on-Suir Town Council from 1988 to 2011, and served as Mayor of the town on two occasions.

He was the Labour Party candidate for the Tipperary South constituency at the 2001 by-election and at the 2002 general election but was not elected.

He was the Labour Party Seanad spokesperson on Environment and Defence from 2011 to 2016.

He retired from the Seanad on health grounds in November 2017.
