= Seán Treacy (politician) =

Irish politician (1923–2018)

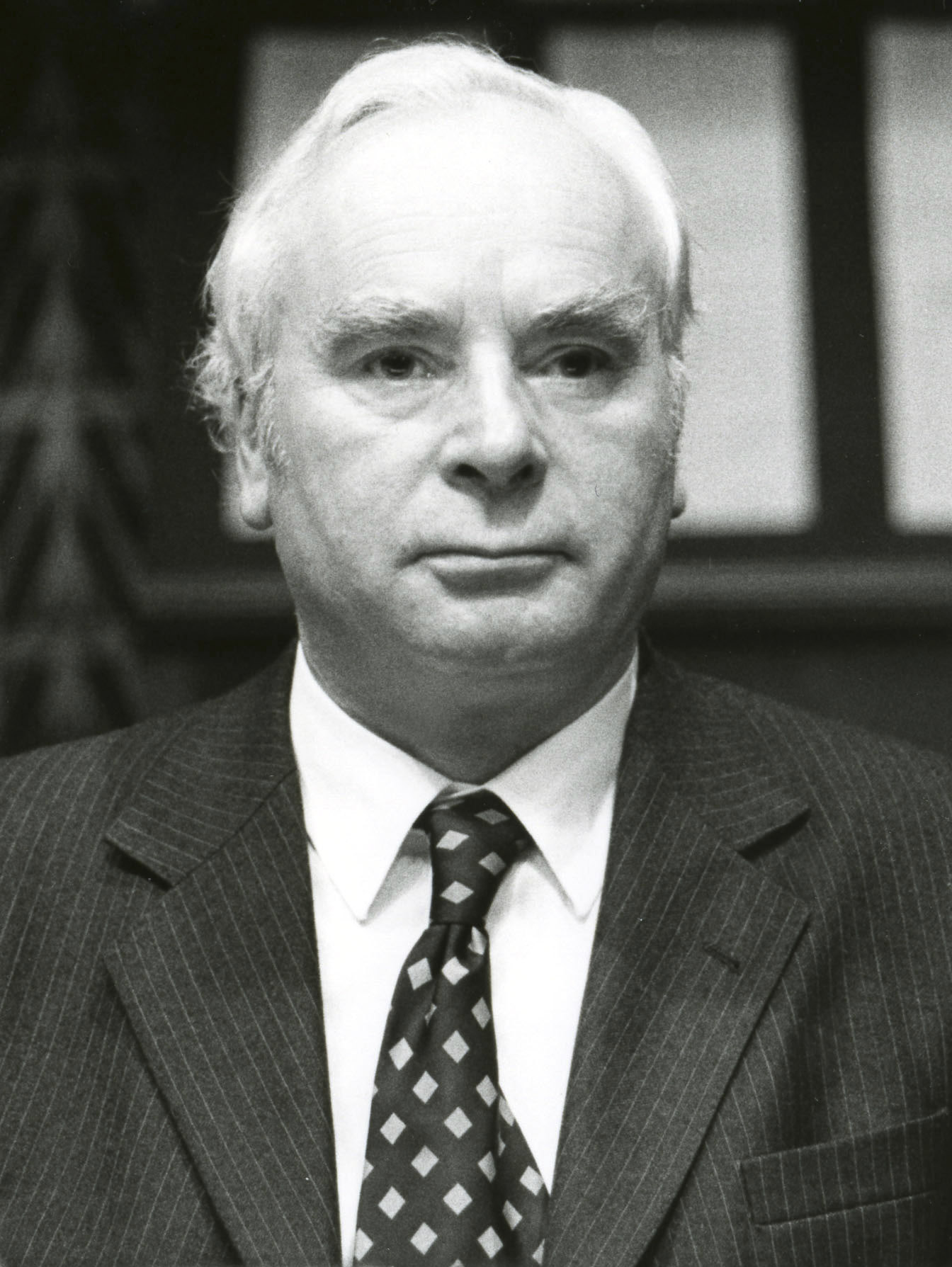
- Treacy in 1981

Ceann Comhairle of Dáil Éireann
- In office 10 March 1987 – 26 June 1997
- Deputy: Jim Tunney; Joe Jacob
- Preceded by: Tom Fitzpatrick
- Succeeded by: Séamus Pattison
- In office 14 March 1973 – 5 July 1977
- Deputy: Denis Jones
- Preceded by: Cormac Breslin
- Succeeded by: Joseph Brennan

Teachta Dála
- In office October 1961 – June 1997
- Constituency: Tipperary South

Member of the European Parliament
- In office 20 June 1981 – 12 May 1984
- Constituency: Munster

Personal details
- Born: 22 September 1923 Clonmel, Ireland
- Died: 23 March 2018 (aged 94) County Tipperary, Ireland
- Party: Labour Party
- Spouse: Catherine Treacy (m. 1951; died 2004)

Seán Daniel Treacy (22 September 1923 – 23 March 2018) was an Irish Labour Party politician who served as Ceann Comhairle of Dáil Éireann from 1973 to 1977 and 1987 to 1997. He served as a Teachta Dála (TD) for the Tipperary South constituency from 1961 to 1997. He also served as a Member of the European Parliament (MEP) for the Munster constituency from 1981 to 1984.

== Political career ==
Author R. M. Douglas wrote that Treacy was a party member of fringe Fascist group Ailtirí na hAiséirghe during the 1940s. However, by the 1960s Treacy had moved to the ideological left, albeit he was still considered to be socially conservative. Treacy was first elected to the Dáil at the 1961 general election, as a Labour Party TD for the Tipperary South constituency. He was re-elected there in seven subsequent elections, and returned automatically in three more owing to his having been elected by the Dáil as Ceann Comhairle. He was elected to that office first after the 1973 general election for one term, then after the 1987 general election for three. As Ceann Comhairle, he was a member of the Irish Presidential Commission during the presidential vacancies of 1974 and 1976.

He served as an MEP from 1981 to 1984, replacing Eileen Desmond who resigned as an MEP when she was appointed Minister for Health and Minister for Social Welfare.

He was expelled from the Labour Party in 1985 for voting against the family planning bill, which would have liberalised the sale of contraception in the Republic of Ireland. He was elected as an Independent TD at the 1987 general election. After that election, he was elected as Ceann Comhairle by the Dáil. One of his first acts was to exercise his casting vote in favour of the nomination of Charles Haughey as Taoiseach. Treacy retired from politics at the 1997 general election, the only Ceann Comhairle to retire from the position at an election, rather than exercising his right of automatic re-election.

He died in Waterford on 23 March 2018, at the age of 94. His funeral, which was attended by President Michael D. Higgins, Taoiseach Leo Varadkar and former Minister Martin Mansergh, was held on 26 March 2018.

Political offices
Preceded by Cormac Breslin	Ceann Comhairle of Dáil Éireann; 1973–1977	Succeeded by Joseph Brennan
Preceded by Thomas J. Fitzpatrick	Ceann Comhairle of Dáil Éireann; 1987–1997	Succeeded by Séamus Pattison

Dáil	Election	Deputy (Party)	Deputy (Party)	Deputy (Party)	Deputy (Party)
13th	1948	Michael Davern (FF)	Richard Mulcahy (FG)	Dan Breen (FF)	John Timoney (CnaP)
14th	1951	Michael Davern (FF)	Richard Mulcahy (FG)	Dan Breen (FF)	Patrick Crowe (FG)
15th	1954	Michael Davern (FF)	Richard Mulcahy (FG)	Dan Breen (FF)	Patrick Crowe (FG)
16th	1957	Michael Davern (FF)	Richard Mulcahy (FG)	Dan Breen (FF)	Frank Loughman (FF)
17th	1961	Michael Davern (FF)	Patrick Hogan (FG)	Dan Breen (FF)	Seán Treacy (Note: Treacy served as Ceann Comhairle in the 20th Dáil from 1973 to 1977, and was returned automatically at the 1977 election. He lost the Labour party whip in February 1985.) (Lab)
18th	1965	Don Davern (FF)	Patrick Hogan (FG)	Jackie Fahey (FF)	Seán Treacy (Lab)
19th	1969	Noel Davern (FF)	Patrick Hogan (FG)	Jackie Fahey (FF)	Seán Treacy (Lab)
20th	1973	Noel Davern (FF)	Brendan Griffin (FG)	Jackie Fahey (FF)	Seán Treacy (Lab)
21st	1977	Noel Davern (FF)	Brendan Griffin (FG)	3 seats 1977–1981	Seán Treacy (Lab)
22nd	1981	Carrie Acheson (FF)	Brendan Griffin (FG)	Seán McCarthy (FF)	Seán Treacy (Lab)
23rd	1982 (Feb)	Seán Byrne (FF)	Brendan Griffin (FG)	Seán McCarthy (FF)	Seán Treacy (Lab)
24th	1982 (Nov)	Seán Byrne (FF)	Brendan Griffin (FG)	Seán McCarthy (FF)	Seán Treacy (Lab)
25th	1987	Noel Davern (FF)	Brendan Griffin (FG)	Seán McCarthy (FF)	Seán Treacy (Note: Treacy served as Ceann Comhairle in the 25th, 26th and 27th Dáil from 1987 to 1997, and was returned automatically at the 1989 and 1992 elections.) (Ind.)
26th	1989	Noel Davern (FF)	Theresa Ahearn (FG)	Michael Ferris (Lab)	Seán Treacy (Ind.)
27th	1992	Noel Davern (FF)	Theresa Ahearn (FG)	Michael Ferris (Lab)	Seán Treacy (Ind.)
28th	1997	Noel Davern (FF)	Theresa Ahearn (FG)	Michael Ferris (Lab)	3 seats from 1997
28th	2000 by-election	Noel Davern (FF)	Theresa Ahearn (FG)	Séamus Healy (Ind.)	3 seats from 1997
28th	2001 by-election	Noel Davern (FF)	Tom Hayes (FG)	Séamus Healy (Ind.)	3 seats from 1997
29th	2002	Noel Davern (FF)	Tom Hayes (FG)	Séamus Healy (Ind.)	3 seats from 1997
30th	2007	Mattie McGrath (FF)	Tom Hayes (FG)	Martin Mansergh (FF)	3 seats from 1997
31st	2011	Mattie McGrath (Ind.)	Tom Hayes (FG)	Séamus Healy (WUA)	3 seats from 1997
32nd	2016	Constituency abolished. See Tipperary			

Dáil	Election	Deputy (Party)	Deputy (Party)	Deputy (Party)
34th	2024	Mattie McGrath (Ind.)	Michael Murphy (FG)	Séamus Healy (Ind.)
