= Michael Ferris (politician) =

Irish politician (1931–2000)

Teachta Dála
- In office June 1989 – 20 March 2000
- Constituency: Tipperary South

Senator
- In office 8 October 1981 – 15 June 1989
- In office 23 April 1975 – 27 October 1977
- Constituency: Agricultural Panel

Personal details
- Born: 21 November 1931 Bansha, County Tipperary, Ireland
- Died: 20 March 2000 (aged 68) Lisbon, Portugal
- Party: Labour Party
- Spouses: 1. Josephine Tobin; 2. Ellen Kiely
- Children: 6

Michael Ferris (21 November 1931 – 20 March 2000) was an Irish Labour Party politician who served for more than twenty years as a member of the Oireachtas, as both a Senator and a Teachta Dála (TD). Before becoming a full-time politician, he was an administrator in a veterinary practice.

Ferris was from Bansha, County Tipperary. There, in the 1950s, he came under the influence of Canon John Hayes, founder of Muintir na Tíre, and adopted many of his ideas for rural development embracing all sections of the community in an inclusive way. In 1967, he was elected to South Tipperary County Council. He was elected to the 13th Seanad by the Agricultural Panel in a by-election on 23 April 1975. At the 1977 general election, he was an unsuccessful candidate for Dáil Éireann in the Tipperary South constituency, and was also defeated at the subsequent Seanad elections. He was re-elected in 1981 to the 15th Seanad, and returned again in 1982 and 1983.

At the 1987 general election, Ferris unsuccessfully stood again in Tipperary South, but was afterwards re-elected to the 18th Seanad, again by the Agricultural Panel. In the 1989 election to the European Parliament he was defeated in the Munster constituency, trailing far behind his Labour colleague, Eileen Desmond, who narrowly missed a seat. However, polling for the 1989 general election was held on the same day, and he was finally elected to the Dáil, taking his seat in the 26th Dáil on his third attempt. He was re-elected at the 1992 general election and again at the 1997 general election, taking the last seat in each case. He died suddenly while on parliamentary business in Lisbon on 20 March 2000. The subsequent by-election for his Dáil seat was held on 2 June and won by an independent candidate, Séamus Healy.

== Personal life ==
Ferris championed the rural agricultural economy and was Chairman of the Bansha Agricultural and Industrial Show Society for a number of years. He was married twice, firstly to Josephine Tobin of Bansha until her death in 1978, and in 1982 to Ellen Kiely of Tipperary in a ceremony in Cormac's Chapel in the Rock of Cashel. Ferris lived in Rosanna, County Tipperary. He had six children.

Dáil	Election	Deputy (Party)	Deputy (Party)	Deputy (Party)	Deputy (Party)
13th	1948	Michael Davern (FF)	Richard Mulcahy (FG)	Dan Breen (FF)	John Timoney (CnaP)
14th	1951	Michael Davern (FF)	Richard Mulcahy (FG)	Dan Breen (FF)	Patrick Crowe (FG)
15th	1954	Michael Davern (FF)	Richard Mulcahy (FG)	Dan Breen (FF)	Patrick Crowe (FG)
16th	1957	Michael Davern (FF)	Richard Mulcahy (FG)	Dan Breen (FF)	Frank Loughman (FF)
17th	1961	Michael Davern (FF)	Patrick Hogan (FG)	Dan Breen (FF)	Seán Treacy (Note: Treacy served as Ceann Comhairle in the 20th Dáil from 1973 to 1977, and was returned automatically at the 1977 election. He lost the Labour party whip in February 1985.) (Lab)
18th	1965	Don Davern (FF)	Patrick Hogan (FG)	Jackie Fahey (FF)	Seán Treacy (Lab)
19th	1969	Noel Davern (FF)	Patrick Hogan (FG)	Jackie Fahey (FF)	Seán Treacy (Lab)
20th	1973	Noel Davern (FF)	Brendan Griffin (FG)	Jackie Fahey (FF)	Seán Treacy (Lab)
21st	1977	Noel Davern (FF)	Brendan Griffin (FG)	3 seats 1977–1981	Seán Treacy (Lab)
22nd	1981	Carrie Acheson (FF)	Brendan Griffin (FG)	Seán McCarthy (FF)	Seán Treacy (Lab)
23rd	1982 (Feb)	Seán Byrne (FF)	Brendan Griffin (FG)	Seán McCarthy (FF)	Seán Treacy (Lab)
24th	1982 (Nov)	Seán Byrne (FF)	Brendan Griffin (FG)	Seán McCarthy (FF)	Seán Treacy (Lab)
25th	1987	Noel Davern (FF)	Brendan Griffin (FG)	Seán McCarthy (FF)	Seán Treacy (Note: Treacy served as Ceann Comhairle in the 25th, 26th and 27th Dáil from 1987 to 1997, and was returned automatically at the 1989 and 1992 elections.) (Ind.)
26th	1989	Noel Davern (FF)	Theresa Ahearn (FG)	Michael Ferris (Lab)	Seán Treacy (Ind.)
27th	1992	Noel Davern (FF)	Theresa Ahearn (FG)	Michael Ferris (Lab)	Seán Treacy (Ind.)
28th	1997	Noel Davern (FF)	Theresa Ahearn (FG)	Michael Ferris (Lab)	3 seats from 1997
28th	2000 by-election	Noel Davern (FF)	Theresa Ahearn (FG)	Séamus Healy (Ind.)	3 seats from 1997
28th	2001 by-election	Noel Davern (FF)	Tom Hayes (FG)	Séamus Healy (Ind.)	3 seats from 1997
29th	2002	Noel Davern (FF)	Tom Hayes (FG)	Séamus Healy (Ind.)	3 seats from 1997
30th	2007	Mattie McGrath (FF)	Tom Hayes (FG)	Martin Mansergh (FF)	3 seats from 1997
31st	2011	Mattie McGrath (Ind.)	Tom Hayes (FG)	Séamus Healy (WUA)	3 seats from 1997
32nd	2016	Constituency abolished. See Tipperary			

Dáil	Election	Deputy (Party)	Deputy (Party)	Deputy (Party)
34th	2024	Mattie McGrath (Ind.)	Michael Murphy (FG)	Séamus Healy (Ind.)
