= Seán McCarthy (Tipperary politician) =

Irish politician (1937–2021)

Senator
- In office 1 November 1989 – 17 February 1993
- Constituency: Agricultural Panel

Minister of State
- 1987–1989: Industry and Commerce

Teachta Dála
- In office June 1981 – June 1989
- Constituency: Tipperary South

South Tipperary County Councillor
- In office 1979–2014
- Constituency: Cashel

Cashel Urban District Councillor
- In office 1999–2014
- In office 1979–1996
- Constituency: Cashel Town

Personal details
- Born: 1 January 1937 County Tipperary, Ireland
- Died: 12 July 2021 (aged 84) Cashel, County Tipperary, Ireland
- Party: Fianna Fáil
- Other political affiliations: Independent (until 1980)
- Spouse: Mary Jo McCarthy (died 2018)
- Children: 5
- Education: Rockwell College

Seán McCarthy (1 January 1937 – 12 July 2021) was an Irish Fianna Fáil politician.

A medical doctor before entering politics, he was elected to Dáil Éireann as a Fianna Fáil Teachta Dála (TD) for the Tipperary South constituency at the 1981 general election. He was re-elected at each subsequent election until he lost his seat at the 1989 general election.

He was elected to Seanad Éireann for the Agricultural Panel in the following Seanad election. He unsuccessfully contested both the 1992 general election and the subsequent Seanad election. He served as Minister of State at the Department of Industry and Commerce from 1987 to 1989 with responsibility for Science and Technology.

McCarthy was a member of South Tipperary County Council for the Cashel electoral area from 1979 to 2014, and also a member of Cashel Town Council from 1979 to 1996, and 1999 to 2014.

He died on 12 July 2021.

Elections to Dáil Éireann
Party	Election		FPv	FPv%	Result
Fianna Fáil	Tipperary South	1981	4,751	13.7	Elected
Fianna Fáil	Tipperary South	Feb 1982	5,711	14.4	Elected
Fianna Fáil	Tipperary South	Nov 1982	6,996	17.4	Elected
Fianna Fáil	Tipperary South	1987	6,877	16.6	Elected
Fianna Fáil	Tipperary South	1989	7,360	18.8	Not Elected
Fianna Fáil	Tipperary South	1992	3,849	9.7	Not Elected

Elections to South Tipperary County Council
Party	Election		FPv	FPv%	Result
Independent	Cashel LEA	1979	1,441	21.1	Elected
Fianna Fáil	Cashel LEA	1985	1,486	20.5	Elected
Fianna Fáil	Cashel LEA	1991	1,226	18.3	Elected
Fianna Fáil	Cashel LEA	1999	1,022	15.3	Elected
Fianna Fáil	Cashel LEA	2004	1,255	16.5	Elected
Fianna Fáil	Cashel LEA	2009	1,152	17.5	Elected

Dáil	Election	Deputy (Party)	Deputy (Party)	Deputy (Party)	Deputy (Party)
13th	1948	Michael Davern (FF)	Richard Mulcahy (FG)	Dan Breen (FF)	John Timoney (CnaP)
14th	1951	Michael Davern (FF)	Richard Mulcahy (FG)	Dan Breen (FF)	Patrick Crowe (FG)
15th	1954	Michael Davern (FF)	Richard Mulcahy (FG)	Dan Breen (FF)	Patrick Crowe (FG)
16th	1957	Michael Davern (FF)	Richard Mulcahy (FG)	Dan Breen (FF)	Frank Loughman (FF)
17th	1961	Michael Davern (FF)	Patrick Hogan (FG)	Dan Breen (FF)	Seán Treacy (Note: Treacy served as Ceann Comhairle in the 20th Dáil from 1973 to 1977, and was returned automatically at the 1977 election. He lost the Labour party whip in February 1985.) (Lab)
18th	1965	Don Davern (FF)	Patrick Hogan (FG)	Jackie Fahey (FF)	Seán Treacy (Lab)
19th	1969	Noel Davern (FF)	Patrick Hogan (FG)	Jackie Fahey (FF)	Seán Treacy (Lab)
20th	1973	Noel Davern (FF)	Brendan Griffin (FG)	Jackie Fahey (FF)	Seán Treacy (Lab)
21st	1977	Noel Davern (FF)	Brendan Griffin (FG)	3 seats 1977–1981	Seán Treacy (Lab)
22nd	1981	Carrie Acheson (FF)	Brendan Griffin (FG)	Seán McCarthy (FF)	Seán Treacy (Lab)
23rd	1982 (Feb)	Seán Byrne (FF)	Brendan Griffin (FG)	Seán McCarthy (FF)	Seán Treacy (Lab)
24th	1982 (Nov)	Seán Byrne (FF)	Brendan Griffin (FG)	Seán McCarthy (FF)	Seán Treacy (Lab)
25th	1987	Noel Davern (FF)	Brendan Griffin (FG)	Seán McCarthy (FF)	Seán Treacy (Note: Treacy served as Ceann Comhairle in the 25th, 26th and 27th Dáil from 1987 to 1997, and was returned automatically at the 1989 and 1992 elections.) (Ind.)
26th	1989	Noel Davern (FF)	Theresa Ahearn (FG)	Michael Ferris (Lab)	Seán Treacy (Ind.)
27th	1992	Noel Davern (FF)	Theresa Ahearn (FG)	Michael Ferris (Lab)	Seán Treacy (Ind.)
28th	1997	Noel Davern (FF)	Theresa Ahearn (FG)	Michael Ferris (Lab)	3 seats from 1997
28th	2000 by-election	Noel Davern (FF)	Theresa Ahearn (FG)	Séamus Healy (Ind.)	3 seats from 1997
28th	2001 by-election	Noel Davern (FF)	Tom Hayes (FG)	Séamus Healy (Ind.)	3 seats from 1997
29th	2002	Noel Davern (FF)	Tom Hayes (FG)	Séamus Healy (Ind.)	3 seats from 1997
30th	2007	Mattie McGrath (FF)	Tom Hayes (FG)	Martin Mansergh (FF)	3 seats from 1997
31st	2011	Mattie McGrath (Ind.)	Tom Hayes (FG)	Séamus Healy (WUA)	3 seats from 1997
32nd	2016	Constituency abolished. See Tipperary			

Dáil	Election	Deputy (Party)	Deputy (Party)	Deputy (Party)
34th	2024	Mattie McGrath (Ind.)	Michael Murphy (FG)	Séamus Healy (Ind.)
