= 1991 North Tipperary County Council election =

Part of the 1991 Irish local elections

← 1985	27 June 1991	1999 →

All 21 seats on North Tipperary County Council
	First party	Second party	Third party
Party	Fianna Fáil	Fine Gael	Labour
Seats won	11	7	2
Seat change	-1	+1	+1
	Fourth party
Party	Independent
Seats won	1
Seat change	-1
- Map showing the area of North Tipperary County Council
Council control after election
Fianna Fail

An election to North Tipperary County Council took place on 27 June 1991 as part of that year's Irish local elections. 21 councillors were elected from four local electoral areas (LEAs) for a five-year term of office on the electoral system of proportional representation by means of the single transferable vote (PR-STV). This term was extended twice, first to 1998, then to 1999.

== Results by party ==
Party	Seats	±	First Pref. votes	FPv%	±%
Fianna Fáil	11	-1	12,996	45.5	
Fine Gael	7	+1	10,266	35.9	
Labour	2	+1	2,888	10.1	
Progressive Democrats	0	0	1,080	3.8	
Independent	1	-1	994	3.5	
Sinn Féin	0	0	364	1.3	
Totals	21	-	28,588	100.0	—

== Results by local electoral area ==
=== Borrisokane ===
Borrisokane - 4 seats
Party	Candidate	FPv%	Count				
Party	Candidate	FPv%	1	2	3	4	5
Fianna Fáil	Jim Casey*	21.5%	1,212				
Fianna Fáil	Senator Tony McKenna*	17.2%	970	1,007	1,028	1,139	
Fianna Fáil	Michael Hough*	13.2%	745	763	791	884	1,229
Fine Gael	Gerard Darcy	12.1%	681	718	727	884	999
Fianna Fáil	John Carroll	11.2%	630	642	656	738	
Fine Gael	Liam Whyte*	10.9%	613	672	678	805	858
Labour	Larry Dunne	10.1%	567	620	625		
Progressive Democrats	Tony Esmonde	4%	224				
Electorate: 7,902 Valid: 5,642 (71.4%) Spoilt: 54 Quota: 1,129 Turnout: 5,696 (72.08%)

=== Nenagh-Newport ===
Nenagh-Newport - 7 seats
Party	Candidate	FPv%	Count									
Party	Candidate	FPv%	1	2	3	4	5	6	7	8	9	10
Fine Gael	Willie Kennedy*	11.9%	1,182	1,182	1,184	1,196	1,234	1,249				
Labour	Senator John Ryan*	11.2%	1,107	1,114	1,156	1,179	1,325					
Fianna Fáil	Tom Harrington*	10.1%	998	999	1,001	1,018	1,036	1,040	1,498			
Fine Gael	Tom Ryan	9.6%	950	951	952	972	981	995	1,042	1,074	1,148	1,164
Fianna Fáil	John Sheehy*	8.2%	808	808	820	833	840	840	863	923	1,019	1,235
Fianna Fáil	Mattie (Coole) Ryan	8%	795	796	797	802	823	826	851	870	974	1,154
Independent	Joseph O'Connor*	7.8%	767	774	779	790	797	811	927	955	1,043	1,141
Fine Gael	Tom Berkery*	6.8%	673	677	680	724	746	768	782	928	944	1,014
Fianna Fáil	Ger Ryan	5.8%	570	570	571	576	587	596	641	650		
Fianna Fáil	Sean Boland	5.7%	564	566	588	594	602	604	615	764	796	
Fine Gael	Martin O'Sullivan	4.7%	467	483	521	527	528	530	539			
Sinn Féin	Jimmy Nolan	3.7%	364	364	364	376	384	386				
Labour	Matt Ryan	2.9%	283	285	299	301						
Progressive Democrats	Michael Flannery	1.6%	154	179	180							
Labour	Patrick Coleman	1.5%	148	149								
Progressive Democrats	John English	0.7%	68									
Electorate: 14,173 Valid: 9,898 (69.84%) Spoilt: 104 Quota: 1,238 Turnout: 10,002 (70.6%)

=== Roscrea-Templemore ===
Roscrea-Templemore - 5 seats
Party	Candidate	FPv%	Count				
Party	Candidate	FPv%	1	2	3	4	5
Fine Gael	Denis Ryan*	21.6%	1,446				
Fianna Fáil	John Egan*	16.25%	1,086	1,095	1,130		
Fianna Fáil	Dan Smith*	14.8%	988	1,033	1,060	1,139	
Fianna Fáil	Seán Mulrooney	13.7%	916	989	1,012	1,043	1,046
Fine Gael	Noel Coonan	13.2%	879	979	1,012	1,114	1,116
Fine Gael	John Butler	12.3%	821	891	918	1,025	1,028
Labour	Liam Leahy	5.3%	356	376	412		
Progressive Democrats	Michael Treacy	2.9%	192	206			
Electorate: 9,940 Valid: 6,684 (67.2%) Spoilt: 66 Quota: 1,140 Turnout: 6,750 (67.9%)

=== Thurles ===
Thurles - 5 seats
Party	Candidate	FPv%	Count					
Party	Candidate	FPv%	1	2	3	4	5	6
Fine Gael	Michael Lowry TD*	30.8%	1,958					
Fianna Fáil	Mary Hanafin*	18.9%	1,204					
Fianna Fáil	Harry Ryan*	14.6%	926	1,009	1,046	1,061		
Fine Gael	Mae Quinn	9.4%	596	1,149				
Fianna Fáil	Larry Looby*	9.18%	584	648	709	717	753	873
Progressive Democrats	Frank Dwan*	6.9%	442	505	529	557	614	
Labour	Martin Kennedy	6.7%	427	512	526	551	668	918
Independent	Denis Ryan	3.6%	227	276	283	283		
Electorate: 10,367 Valid: 6,364 (61.4%) Spoilt: 62 Quota: 1,061 Turnout: 6,426 (62%)
