= 1985 North Tipperary County Council election =

Part of the 1985 Irish local elections

← 1979	20 June 1985	1991 →

All 21 seats on North Tipperary County Council
	First party	Second party	Third party
Party	Fianna Fáil	Fine Gael	Labour
Seats won	12	6	1
Seat change	+3	-2	-2
	Fourth party
Party	Independent
Seats won	2
Seat change	+1
- Map showing the area of North Tipperary County Council
Council control after election
TBD

An election to North Tipperary County Council took place on 20 June 1985 as part of the Irish local elections. 21 councillors were elected from four local electoral areas (LEAs) for a five-year term of office on the electoral system of proportional representation by means of the single transferable vote (PR-STV). This term was extended for a further year, to 1991.

== Results by party ==
Party	Seats	±	First Pref. votes	FPv%	±%
Fianna Fáil	12	+3	15,818	52.78	
Fine Gael	6	-2	8,736	29.15	
Labour	1	-2	3,784	12.63	
Independent	2	+1	1,649	5.50	
Totals	21	-	28,588	100.00	—

== Results by local electoral area ==
=== Borrisokane ===
Borrisokane: 4 seats
Party	Candidate	FPv%	Count				
Party	Candidate	FPv%	1	2	3	4	5
Fianna Fáil	Jim Casey		1,089	1,094	1,120	1,174	
Fianna Fáil	Michael Hough*		966	975	1,028	1,068	1,284
Fianna Fáil	Tony McKenna*		876	888	931	957	1,325
Fine Gael	Liam Whyte*		742	762	838	1,077	1,115
Fianna Fáil	John Carroll		616	662	712	729	
Fine Gael	Paddy Brennan		518	553	599	757	785
Fine Gael	Gerard Darcy		461	502	554		
Labour	Jim Hough		288	409			
Labour	Maureen Carmody		277				
Electorate: 7,793 Valid: 5,833 (75.66%) Spoilt: 54 Quota: 63 Turnout: 5,896

=== Nenagh-Newport ===
Nenagh-Newport: 7 seats
Party	Candidate	FPv%	Count										
Party	Candidate	FPv%	1	2	3	4	5	6	7	8	9	10	11
Labour	John Ryan TD*		1,243	1,270	1,295								
Fianna Fáil	Mairead Ryan		1,183	1,194	1,328								
Fianna Fáil	Tom Harrington*		1,056	1,066	1,130	1,161	1,182	1,190	1,191	1,438			
Independent	Joseph O'Connor*		946	949	959	1,034	1,090	1,092	1,093	1,130	1,133	1,287	
Fianna Fáil	John Sheehy*		792	793	843	865	928	945	948	1,055	1,112	1,523	
Fine Gael	Tom Ryan		770	773	775	860	899	899	899	916	917	1,005	1,030
Fine Gael	Tom Berkery*		739	751	757	815	953	954	955	1,007	1,013	1,046	1,062
Fianna Fáil	Ger Ryan*		690	693	718	782	789	792	792	852	909		
Fine Gael	Willie Kennedy		688	715	726	739	836	837	838	1,010	1,041	1,065	1,077
Fianna Fáil	Jacksie Ryan		677	680	717	727	767	780	785				
Fine Gael	Martin O'Sullivan		495	496	547	561							
Fianna Fáil	Ned Foley		429	430									
Labour	Frank Lewis*		419	446	451								
Labour	Mary Brosnan		133										
Electorate: 13,646 Valid: 10,260 (76.13%) Spoilt: 129 Quota: 1,283 Turnout: 10,389

=== Roscrea-Templemore ===
Roscrea-Templemore: 5 seats
Party	Candidate	FPv%	Count						
Party	Candidate	FPv%	1	2	3	4	5	6	7
Fianna Fáil	Sen. Michael Smith*		1,948						
Fianna Fáil	Seán Mulrooney		1,071	1,344					
Fianna Fáil	John Egan*		1,035	1,337					
Fine Gael	Denis Ryan*		834	895	935	954	969	1,303	
Fine Gael	Denis Meagher		700	755	763	796	846	924	1,026
Fine Gael	John Butler		679	703	710	747	783	840	873
Labour	Tommy Shanahan*		560	603	651	659	731		
Labour	Kevin Devaney		178	200	204	217			
Electorate: 9,696 Valid: 7,005 (73.08%) Spoilt: 81 Quota: 1,168 Turnout: 7,086

=== Thurles ===
Thurles: 5 seats
Party	Candidate	FPv%	Count				
Party	Candidate	FPv%	1	2	3	4	5
Fianna Fáil	Jane Hanafin*		1,751				
Fine Gael	Michael Lowry*		1,542				
Fianna Fáil	Harry Ryan*		978	1,140	1,193		
Independent	Frank Dwan*		703	826	870	878	1,156
Labour	Andrew Callinan		686	747	795	807	
Fianna Fáil	Larry Looby		661	879	916	930	1,061
Fine Gael	Mae Quinn		568	609	805	818	1,020
Electorate: 10,297 Valid: 6,871 (67.55%) Spoilt: 85 Quota: 1,146 Turnout: 6,956
