= 1999 North Tipperary County Council election =

Part of the 1999 Irish local elections

- 10 June 1999

All 21 seats to North Tipperary County Council
	First party	Second party	Third party
Party	Fianna Fáil	Fine Gael	Labour
Seats won	12	5	1
Seat change	+1	-2	-1
	Fourth party
Party	Independent
Seats won	3
Seat change	+2
- Map showing the area of North Tipperary County Council
Council control after election
Fianna Fail

An election to North Tipperary County Council took place on 10 June 1999 as part of that year's Irish local elections. 21 councillors were elected from four local electoral areas for a five-year term of office on the system of proportional representation using the single transferable vote (PR-STV).

== Results by party ==
Party	Seats	±	First Pref. votes	FPv%	±%
Fianna Fáil	12	+1	14,639	47.27	
Fine Gael	5	-2	8,147	26.31	
Independent	3	+2	4,927	15.91	
Labour	1	-1	2,805	9.06	
Sinn Féin	0	0	450	1.45	
Totals	21	0	30,968	100.00	—

== Results by local electoral area ==
=== Borrisokane ===
Borrisokane - 3 seats
Party	Candidate	FPv%	Count				
Party	Candidate	FPv%	1	2	3	4	5
Fianna Fáil	Jim Casey*	24.16	1,092	1,156			
Fine Gael	Louis McCormack	18.96	857	911	1,023	1,040	1,048
Fine Gael	Gerard Darcy*	16.80	759	910	1,024	1,053	1,071
Fianna Fáil	Tony McKenna*	16.42	742	838	1,176		
Fianna Fáil	Michael Hough*	12.90	583	665			
Labour	Larry Dunne	10.75	486				
Electorate: 6,701 Valid: 4,519 (67.44%) Spoilt: 44 Quota: 1,130 Turnout: 4,563 (68.09%)

=== Nenagh ===
Nenagh - 7 seats
Party	Candidate	FPv%	Count						
Party	Candidate	FPv%	1	2	3	4	5	6	7
Fianna Fáil	Maire Hoctor	13.41	1,515						
Fianna Fáil	Tom Harrington*	10.23	1,156	1,180	1,182	1,239	1,285	1,337	1,498
Fianna Fáil	Mattie (Coole) Ryan*	9.84	1,112	1,128	1,139	1,183	1,309	1,330	1,515
Fine Gael	Tom Berkery	9.35	1,056	1,061	1,106	1,135	1,158	1,230	1,306
Fianna Fáil	John Carroll	8.64	976	988	992	1,056	1,069	1,178	1,360
Independent	Martin Kennedy	8.33	941	942	1,033	1,041	1,236	1,265	1,357
Fine Gael	Tom Ryan*	8.27	934	944	975	1,013	1,019	1,050	1,079
Fianna Fáil	John Sheehy*	7.51	848	855	878	912	967	1,030	
Labour	Seán Creamer	6.85	774	777	783	805	814		
Labour	Senator Kathleen O'Meara	6.79	767	785	794	865	890	1,279	1,417
Fianna Fáil	Cait Delahunty	4.56	515	517	536	545			
Sinn Féin	Paddy Hackett	3.98	450	454	456				
Fine Gael	Pat Vaughan	2.24	253	253					
Electorate: 17,208 Valid: 11,297 (65.65%) Spoilt: 130 Quota: 1,413 Turnout: 11,427 (66.41%)

=== Templemore ===
Templemore - 5 seats
Party	Candidate	FPv%	Count				
Party	Candidate	FPv%	1	2	3	4	5
Fine Gael	Noel Coonan*	26.99	1,858				
Fine Gael	Denis Ryan*	13.82	951	1,105	1,210		
Fianna Fáil	Seán Mulrooney*	13.03	897	932	981	999	1,023
Fianna Fáil	Dr. Joe Hennessy	11.46	789	975	1,014	1,125	1,137
Fianna Fáil	John Hogan	11.46	789	865	890	1,120	1,121
Fianna Fáil	Dan Smith*	11.13	766	838	862	938	963
Fine Gael	Willie Kennedy	7.42	511	665	712		
Labour	Anne Keegan	4.68	322	355			
Electorate: 11,126 Valid: 6,883 (61.86%) Spoilt: 79 Quota: 1,148 Turnout: 6,962 (62.57%)

=== Thurles ===
Thurles - 6 seats
Party	Candidate	FPv%	Count					
Party	Candidate	FPv%	1	2	3	4	5	6
Independent	Michael Lowry TD*	35.94	3,049					
Fianna Fáil	Harry Ryan*	13.13	1,114	1,346				
Independent	Willie Kennedy*	11.04	937	1,525				
Fianna Fáil	John Egan*	10.33	876	959	988	1,013	1,045	1,163
Fianna Fáil	John Hanafin*	10.24	869	1,085	1,132	1,173	1,224	
Fine Gael	Seán Cahill	5.83	495	694	765	785	824	932
Fine Gael	Mae Quinn*	5.58	473	706	770	793	905	1,115
Labour	John Kenehan	5.37	456	643	699	716	771	
Independent	Noel O'Dwyer	2.53	205	313	358	365		
Electorate: 13,824 Valid: 8,484 (61.37%) Spoilt: 119 Quota: 1,213 Turnout: 8,603 (62.23%)
