= Liam Whyte =

Irish politician (1926/1927–2019)

Senator
- In office 1 June 1973 – 27 October 1977
- Constituency: Agricultural Panel

Personal details
- Born: 1926 or 1927 County Tipperary, Ireland
- Died: 26 November 2019 (aged 92) County Tipperary, Ireland
- Party: Fine Gael
- Spouse: Kathleen Brady

Liam Whyte (c.1926/1927 – 26 November 2019) was an Irish Fine Gael politician.

He was elected to North Tipperary County Council in 1960 and served as its chairperson from 1968 to 1969 and again from 1979 to 1980. He stood for election to Dáil Éireann as a Fine Gael candidate for the Tipperary North constituency at the 1961, 1969, 1973 and 1977 general elections but was unsuccessful on each occasion.

He was elected to Seanad Éireann by the Agricultural Panel at the 1973 Seanad election. He lost his seat at the 1977 Seanad election.

He died in December 2019, aged 92.
