= Thomas Dunne (Irish politician) =

Irish politician (1926–1990)

Teachta Dála
- In office October 1961 – June 1977
- Constituency: Tipperary North

Member of the European Parliament
- In office March 1973 – June 1977
- Constituency: Oireachtas Delegation

Personal details
- Born: 10 March 1926 County Tipperary, Ireland
- Died: 3 August 1990 (aged 64) County Tipperary, Ireland
- Party: Fine Gael

Thomas Dunne (10 March 1926 – 3 August 1990) was an Irish Fine Gael politician and Teachta Dála (TD) for Tipperary North from 1961 to 1977.

He was an unsuccessful candidate at the 1957 general election, but at the 1961 general election he defeated the Fianna Fáil TD Mary Ryan, and took his seat in the 17th Dáil. He was re-elected at the next three general elections, before losing his seat in the Fianna Fáil landslide at the 1977 general election to Michael Smith.

In 1973, Dunne was appointed a member of the second delegation from the Oireachtas to the European Parliament.

Dáil	Election	Deputy (Party)	Deputy (Party)	Deputy (Party)
13th	1948	Patrick Kinane (CnaP)	Mary Ryan (FF)	Daniel Morrissey (FG)
14th	1951	John Fanning (FF)	Mary Ryan (FF)	Daniel Morrissey (FG)
15th	1954	John Fanning (FF)	Mary Ryan (FF)	Daniel Morrissey (FG)
16th	1957	John Fanning (FF)	Mary Ryan (FF)	Patrick Tierney (Lab)
17th	1961	John Fanning (FF)	Thomas Dunne (FG)	Patrick Tierney (Lab)
18th	1965	John Fanning (FF)	Thomas Dunne (FG)	Patrick Tierney (Lab)
19th	1969	Michael O'Kennedy (FF)	Thomas Dunne (FG)	Michael Smith (FF)
20th	1973	Michael O'Kennedy (FF)	Thomas Dunne (FG)	John Ryan (Lab)
21st	1977	Michael O'Kennedy (FF)	Michael Smith (FF)	John Ryan (Lab)
22nd	1981	David Molony (FG)	Michael Smith (FF)	John Ryan (Lab)
23rd	1982 (Feb)	David Molony (FG)	Michael O'Kennedy (FF)	John Ryan (Lab)
24th	1982 (Nov)	David Molony (FG)	Michael O'Kennedy (FF)	John Ryan (Lab)
25th	1987	Michael Lowry (FG)	Michael O'Kennedy (FF)	Michael Smith (FF)
26th	1989	Michael Lowry (FG)	Michael O'Kennedy (FF)	Michael Smith (FF)
27th	1992	Michael Lowry (FG)	John Ryan (Lab)	Michael Smith (FF)
28th	1997	Michael Lowry (Ind.)	Michael O'Kennedy (FF)	Michael Smith (FF)
29th	2002	Michael Lowry (Ind.)	Máire Hoctor (FF)	Michael Smith (FF)
30th	2007	Michael Lowry (Ind.)	Máire Hoctor (FF)	Noel Coonan (FG)
31st	2011	Michael Lowry (Ind.)	Alan Kelly (Lab)	Noel Coonan (FG)
32nd	2016	Constituency abolished. See Tipperary and Offaly		

Dáil	Election	Deputy (Party)	Deputy (Party)	Deputy (Party)
34th	2024	Michael Lowry (Ind.)	Alan Kelly (Lab)	Ryan O'Meara (FF)
