= Michael Kennedy Ryan =

Irish Catholic priest

Canon Michael Kennedy Ryan (4 October 1867 – 3 April 1925) was an Irish Catholic priest, teacher and supporter of the Gaelic Athletic Association.

== Biography ==
Michael Kennedy Ryan was born at Knockfune, Newport, County Tipperary, on 4 October 1867. (Other sources give an alternative birthdate of 29 September 1868.)

He was educated locally at Toor National School before going to Mount Mellery. He went to study for the priesthood in St. Patrick's College, Thurles, and from there he proceeded to Maynooth College where he was ordained in 1893.

He served as Chairman of the Tipperary County Board of the GAA.

He taught at the seminary of St. Patrick's College, Thurles for four years.

The New Stand, Ardán Ui Riain in Semple Stadium is named after Canon Ryan. The Canon Ryan Memorial Hall in Lattin, South Tipperary where he served as parish priest is also named after him.

His family were heavily involved in Gaelic sports and Irish nationalism, and two of his brothers were significant figures in the GAA. His nephew Paddy Ryan (Lacken) played a significant role in the war of independence in Tipperary (Newport GAA's Lacken Park is named after him) and was elected TD for Tipperary in 1923. Another nephew Martin Ryan was a Fianna Fáil politician who represented Tipperary North in the Dáil.
