= Ryan O'Meara =

Ryan O'Meara may refer to:

- Ryan O'Meara (figure skater)
- Ryan O'Meara (politician)
