= Patrick Tierney =

Patrick Tierney may refer to:

- Patrick Tierney (author), American author
- Patrick Tierney (Irish politician) (1904–1990), Irish Labour Party politician who represented Tipperary North
- Patrick Lennox Tierney (1914–2015), Japanologist academic in art history
