= Patrick Ryan (Irish politician) =

Irish politician (1898–1944)

Teachta Dála
- In office August 1923 – June 1927
- Constituency: Tipperary

Personal details
- Born: 16 November 1898 Newport, County Tipperary, Ireland
- Died: 21 January 1944 (aged 45)
- Party: Sinn Féin
- Relatives: Martin Ryan (brother); Michael Kennedy Ryan (uncle)

Patrick Ryan (16 November 1898 – 21 January 1944), also known as Paddy Ryan Lacken, was an Irish nationalist and politician. He was born in Newport, County Tipperary.

Ryan became active in the Irish War of Independence in Limerick and Tipperary, serving as Captain in the C Company of the 6th Battalion, Tipperary No. 1 Brigade, 3rd South Division of the IRA. He took the Anti-Treaty side in the Irish Civil War, and was arrested by Pro-Treaty forces in 1923. In his Civil War memoir The Gates Flew Open, Peadar O'Donnell describes an incident where Ryan, under sentence of execution, was mistakenly transferred to Harepark Camp in the Curragh. When the order came to hand him over, he was kept hidden by his fellow prisoners.

He was elected to Dáil Éireann as a Sinn Féin Teachta Dála (TD) for the Tipperary constituency at the 1923 general election. He did not take his seat in the Dáil due to Sinn Féin's abstentionist policy. He did not contest the June 1927 general election.

He emigrated to the US, where he became a businessman, still supporting Irish nationalist campaigns, he died in America on 21 January 1944.

His family were involved in Irish nationalism and the GAA; his father was a local GAA official. His uncle was the priest and GAA figure Canon Michael Kennedy Ryan, and his brother Martin Ryan served as a Fianna Fáil TD for Tipperary from 1933 to 1943.

Newport GAA's Lacken Park is named after him.

Dáil	Election	Deputy (Party)	Deputy (Party)	Deputy (Party)	Deputy (Party)	Deputy (Party)	Deputy (Party)	Deputy (Party)
4th	1923	Dan Breen (Rep)	Séamus Burke (CnaG)	Louis Dalton (CnaG)	Daniel Morrissey (Lab)	Patrick Ryan (Rep)	Michael Heffernan (FP)	Seán McCurtin (CnaG)
5th	1927 (Jun)	Seán Hayes (FF)	Séamus Burke (CnaG)	John Hassett (CnaG)	Daniel Morrissey (Lab)	William O'Brien (Lab)	Michael Heffernan (FP)	Andrew Fogarty (FF)
6th	1927 (Sep)	Seán Hayes (FF)	Séamus Burke (CnaG)	John Hassett (CnaG)	Daniel Morrissey (Lab)	Timothy Sheehy (FF)	Michael Heffernan (FP)	Andrew Fogarty (FF)
7th	1932	Seán Hayes (FF)	Séamus Burke (CnaG)	John Hassett (CnaG)	Daniel Morrissey (Ind.)	Timothy Sheehy (FF)	Dan Breen (FF)	Andrew Fogarty (FF)
8th	1933	Seán Hayes (FF)	Séamus Burke (CnaG)	Richard Curran (NCP)	Daniel Morrissey (CnaG)	Martin Ryan (FF)	Dan Breen (FF)	Andrew Fogarty (FF)
9th	1937	William O'Brien (Lab)	Séamus Burke (FG)	Jeremiah Ryan (FG)	Daniel Morrissey (FG)	Martin Ryan (FF)	Dan Breen (FF)	Andrew Fogarty (FF)
10th	1938	Frank Loughman (FF)	Richard Curran (FG)	Jeremiah Ryan (FG)	Daniel Morrissey (FG)	Martin Ryan (FF)	Dan Breen (FF)	Andrew Fogarty (FF)
11th	1943	Richard Stapleton (Lab)	William O'Donnell (CnaT)	Jeremiah Ryan (FG)	Daniel Morrissey (FG)	Martin Ryan (FF)	Dan Breen (FF)	Andrew Fogarty (FF)
12th	1944	Frank Loughman (FF)	William O'Donnell (CnaT)	Richard Mulcahy (FG)	Daniel Morrissey (FG)	Mary Ryan (FF)	Dan Breen (FF)	Andrew Fogarty (FF)
12th	1947 by-election	Frank Loughman (FF)	Patrick Kinane (CnaP)	Richard Mulcahy (FG)	Daniel Morrissey (FG)	Mary Ryan (FF)	Dan Breen (FF)	Andrew Fogarty (FF)
13th	1948	Constituency abolished. See Tipperary North and Tipperary South						

Dáil	Election	Deputy (Party)	Deputy (Party)	Deputy (Party)	Deputy (Party)	Deputy (Party)
32nd	2016	Séamus Healy (WUA)	Alan Kelly (Lab)	Jackie Cahill (FF)	Michael Lowry (Ind.)	Mattie McGrath (Ind.)
33rd	2020	Martin Browne (SF)	Alan Kelly (Lab)	Jackie Cahill (FF)	Michael Lowry (Ind.)	Mattie McGrath (Ind.)
34th	2024	Constituency abolished. See Tipperary North and Tipperary South				
