= Irish Army deafness claims =

The army deafness (Note: The affair was commonly described as "army deafness", although some claimants were from the Air Corps or Naval Service rather than the Army, and most had partial rather than total hearing loss.) claims were a series of personal injury claims taken from 1992 to 2002 against the Irish Department of Defence by members of the Irish Defence Forces for noise-induced hearing loss resulting from exposure to loud noise during military operations and training. The claims stated that the government had failed to provide adequate ear protectors during firing exercises, as was required under regulations dating back to the 1950s. About 17,000 claims were made, resulting in payouts totaling about €300m.

== Background ==
From 1952, army regulations required the use of ear protection on shooting ranges and in artillery drill. Initially, cotton wool was recommended; in 1961, cotton wool moistened with Vaseline; and from 1972 plastic Sonex earplugs were provided. In 1987 a comprehensive regime of protection was introduced with modern protection and safety protocols. Some plaintiffs alleged they had used cigarette butts as ear protection. The government in 1998 claimed that all soldiers had been issued from 1952 with protection in conformity to best practice of the time, although the level of protection provided was later recognised as inadequate; that the decision on whether to avail of earplugs was left to the discretion of the soldier rather than being commanded by a superior; and that claims brought by plaintiffs that they had never been issued with protection could not be disproven as there were no specific records kept for earplugs issued to each soldier.

== Legal proceedings ==
Several test cases were brought between 1992 and 1996 by litigants represented by solicitors on a no win no fee basis. Michael Smith, the Minister for Defence in 1998, said:

The cases as they had been heard before the courts went as follows: an isolated case was given an award in August 1992; the next case did not arise until February 1994 — in this case the claim was dismissed; arising from the time lag before cases come to hearing, it was not until December 1995 that a landmark case, the B case with little actual impairment, was heard in the High Court and an award of £45,000 was made; it was not until June 1996 that another case, the N case, came to hearing — the claimant received £24,720, notwithstanding the fact that the presiding judge found that the individual had persevered with a claim for loss of hearing that, on relatively clear evidential grounds, was unsustainable. I have nothing to add to the court's stated reservations about the plaintiff's honesty. Without labouring the point, I trust it will be clear to all Members that this case came as a shattering blow to the State's defence as it laid down a precedent that, even where the plaintiff has been found to be untruthful in the matter of hearing loss, he may still receive substantial compensation for tinnitus. Severe tinnitus — a constant ringing in the ears — is normally present in a small minority of hearing loss cases. It cannot be measured objectively. The case I have just mentioned prompted a major increase in the number of claims.
One further case came to hearing before the summer recess in 1996 and was awarded £25,000. However, it was the sixth, the K case, that proved to be a major landmark. An individual was awarded £80,000 for a minor hearing loss. Although this figure was subsequently reduced under negotiation following a Supreme Court appeal by the State, and although similar cases have subsequently received as little as £5,000, the impact of this judgment is best illustrated by the following statistic: in the five years leading up to this case, a little over 4,000 cases had been submitted to the Department of Defence; in the nine months following it, another 4,000 were received. The floodgates were literally burst open by this judgment. A further case was awarded £17,500 in December. In addition, 136 cases were settled by negotiation during 1996.

A December 1997 written answer to a Dáil question showed over 1,000 cases settled across many units of the Defence Forces. The government adopted a strategy of contesting every claim until a 1997 Supreme Court decision. After this, the Law Society of Ireland facilitated negotiations between the Chief State Solicitor's Office and the Department of Defence on the one hand, and the main solicitors' firms representing claimants on the other, which led to a suspension of court proceedings while a Department of Health expert group developed a standardised metric for assessing hearing loss. This group's 1998 "Green Book" report informed the Civil Liability (Assessment of Hearing Injury) Act 1998. Subsequently, the Supreme Court advised the government to assign standardised rates of compensation for the various levels of hearing loss. It also awarded compensation based on predicted future loss of hearing additional to normal age-related hearing loss; opponents criticised this as impossible to quantify. In December 1999, the Supreme Court accepted the government's formula of IR£750 per degree of deafness attained at age 60. This was the basis for the Early Settlement Scheme used for most claims. The average claim payout fell from €30,000 before the adoption of the guidelines to €10,700 in 2002, €8,900 in 2003, and €5,700 in 2004.

When Michael Bell revealed he had brought a suit for hearing loss relating to his Fórsa Cosanta Áitiúil service, there were calls for him to stand down from the Dáil Public Accounts Committee because of a perception of conflict of interest. He remained on the committee until losing his seat in the 2002 general election.

In 2000, the National Treasury Management Agency was empowered to act as the State Claims Agency for personal injury actions and similar claims against the state. Although the army deafness claims issue informed the debate on the State Claims Agency's establishment, initially the Early Settlement Scheme remained outside its remit. In 2002, the minister stated the Early Settlement Scheme would no longer be open to new claimants, as under the statute of limitations the issue had been in the public domain for ten years. By 2004, 328 claims had been settled in court, with 14,681 claims being settled out of court. It was in 2005 that all outstanding army deafness claims were transferred to the State Claims Agency. This resulted in a reduction of 80% in the ratio of legal costs.

== Consequences ==
=== Cost ===
Defence minister Willie O'Dea said in November 2009 that 16,139 claims had been disposed of, with €288.7m paid to plaintiffs, including legal costs of €100.2 million. There were then 417 "active cases" with an estimated future cost of about €8m. Before the 1998 act was passed, the Public Accounts Committee had estimated a worst-case total cost of £5.5bn, while the Department of Defence had estimated €1bn.

In 2006 it was alleged that solicitors had double-charged fees in some 152 claims, although no charges were brought.

=== Other effects ===
The large number of claims contributed to a fall in public respect for the Defence Forces and a drop in morale of serving members. Jim Mitchell, chair of the Dáil public accounts committee, said in 1997, "Anybody who thinks this is not a scam must be blind. We are a laughing stock among defence forces around the world."

Criticism of solicitors' advertising "no win no fee" services to army veterans resulted in a 2002 amendment to section 71(2) of the Solicitors Act 1954:

A solicitor shall not publish or cause to be published an advertisement which [...]
(h) expressly or impliedly refers to—

(i) claims or possible claims for damages for personal injuries,
(ii) the possible outcome of claims for damages for personal injuries, or
(iii) the provision of legal services by the solicitor in connection with such claims,

(i) expressly or impliedly solicits, encourages or offers any inducement to any person or group or class of persons to make the claims mentioned in paragraph (h) of this subsection or to contact the solicitor with a view to such claims being made
