= David Molony =

Irish politician (1950–2002)

Teachta Dála
- In office June 1981 – February 1987
- Constituency: Tipperary North

Senator
- In office 27 October 1977 – 8 October 1981
- Constituency: Cultural and Educational Panel

Personal details
- Born: 23 August 1950 County Tipperary, Ireland
- Died: 4 September 2002 (aged 52) County Tipperary, Ireland
- Party: Fine Gael
- Spouse: Eve Molony
- Children: 2
- Education: University College Dublin

David Molony (23 August 1950 – 4 September 2002) was an Irish Fine Gael politician who served as both a Senator and a Teachta Dála (TD).

Born in Thurles, County Tipperary, he was educated at CBS Thurles, Coláiste na Rinne in Waterford, Copsewood College in Limerick, University College Dublin and the Law School of the Incorporated Law Society. He qualified as a lawyer and in the 1970s he worked with the Free Legal Aid Centres (FLAC), a voluntary group providing free legal aid, eventually became the chairman of FLAC.

In 1977 he was elected to the 14th Seanad on the Cultural and Educational Panel. At the 1981 general election he was returned to the 22nd Dáil as a TD for the Tipperary North constituency, where during the selection of candidates he had beaten future TD and Minister Michael Lowry for the Fine Gael nomination. He was re-elected at the February 1982 and November 1982 general elections. He supported the 1986 referendum to amend the Constitution of Ireland to remove the prohibition on divorce, and was denounced by priests in his constituency.

Molony did not contest the 1987 general election, and retired from political office to continue his law practice and to run his family's business in Thurles. However he remained involved in politics and was a director of elections for local Fine Gael candidates at the 2002 general election.

Dáil	Election	Deputy (Party)	Deputy (Party)	Deputy (Party)
13th	1948	Patrick Kinane (CnaP)	Mary Ryan (FF)	Daniel Morrissey (FG)
14th	1951	John Fanning (FF)	Mary Ryan (FF)	Daniel Morrissey (FG)
15th	1954	John Fanning (FF)	Mary Ryan (FF)	Daniel Morrissey (FG)
16th	1957	John Fanning (FF)	Mary Ryan (FF)	Patrick Tierney (Lab)
17th	1961	John Fanning (FF)	Thomas Dunne (FG)	Patrick Tierney (Lab)
18th	1965	John Fanning (FF)	Thomas Dunne (FG)	Patrick Tierney (Lab)
19th	1969	Michael O'Kennedy (FF)	Thomas Dunne (FG)	Michael Smith (FF)
20th	1973	Michael O'Kennedy (FF)	Thomas Dunne (FG)	John Ryan (Lab)
21st	1977	Michael O'Kennedy (FF)	Michael Smith (FF)	John Ryan (Lab)
22nd	1981	David Molony (FG)	Michael Smith (FF)	John Ryan (Lab)
23rd	1982 (Feb)	David Molony (FG)	Michael O'Kennedy (FF)	John Ryan (Lab)
24th	1982 (Nov)	David Molony (FG)	Michael O'Kennedy (FF)	John Ryan (Lab)
25th	1987	Michael Lowry (FG)	Michael O'Kennedy (FF)	Michael Smith (FF)
26th	1989	Michael Lowry (FG)	Michael O'Kennedy (FF)	Michael Smith (FF)
27th	1992	Michael Lowry (FG)	John Ryan (Lab)	Michael Smith (FF)
28th	1997	Michael Lowry (Ind.)	Michael O'Kennedy (FF)	Michael Smith (FF)
29th	2002	Michael Lowry (Ind.)	Máire Hoctor (FF)	Michael Smith (FF)
30th	2007	Michael Lowry (Ind.)	Máire Hoctor (FF)	Noel Coonan (FG)
31st	2011	Michael Lowry (Ind.)	Alan Kelly (Lab)	Noel Coonan (FG)
32nd	2016	Constituency abolished. See Tipperary and Offaly		

Dáil	Election	Deputy (Party)	Deputy (Party)	Deputy (Party)
34th	2024	Michael Lowry (Ind.)	Alan Kelly (Lab)	Ryan O'Meara (FF)
