= Tipperary North (Dáil constituency) =

Dáil constituency (1948–2016, 2024–present)

- Dáil constituency
- Location of Tipperary North within Ireland
- Interactive map of constituency boundaries since the 2024 general election
- Major settlements: Nenagh; Roscrea; Templemore; Thurles

Current constituency
- Created: 2024
- Seats: 3
- TDs: Alan Kelly (Lab); Michael Lowry (Ind); Ryan O'Meara (FF)
- Local government area: County Tipperary; County Kilkenny
- Created from: Tipperary

Tipperary North
- Former Dáil constituency
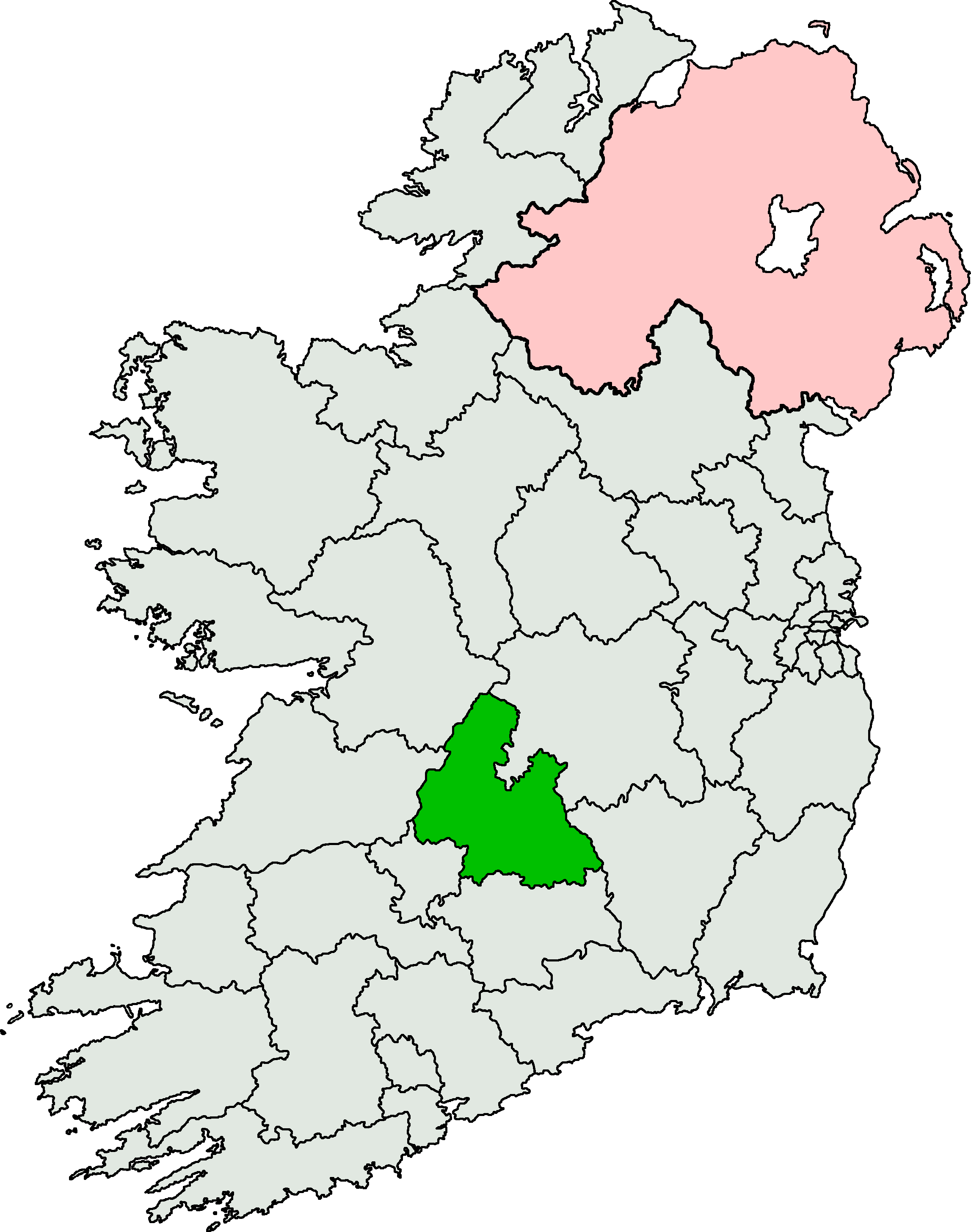
- Location of Tipperary North within Ireland

Former constituency
- Created: 1948
- Abolished: 2016
- Seats: 3
- Local government areas: North Tipperary; South Tipperary; County Offaly
- Created from: Tipperary
- Replaced by: Tipperary; Offaly

Tipperary North is a parliamentary constituency represented in Dáil Éireann, the lower house of the Irish parliament or Oireachtas. The constituency elects three deputies (Teachtaí Dála, commonly known as TDs) on the system of proportional representation by means of the single transferable vote (PR-STV).

== History and boundaries ==
It was created for the 1948 general election when the former constituency of Tipperary was divided into Tipperary North and Tipperary South. It was primarily based around the former county of North Tipperary. The principal population centres were Thurles, Templemore, Nenagh and Roscrea. Tipperary North was a rare example of a bellwether constituency in Ireland; from 1969 onward, with the exception of February 1982, two of the three deputies it returned went on to support the resulting government. The constituency returned at least one TD for Fianna Fáil from 1948 until the 2011 general election.

The counties of North Tipperary and South Tipperary were abolished in 2014, and succeeded by County Tipperary. The constituency of Tipperary North was abolished at the 2016 general election and replaced by the new Tipperary and Offaly constituencies.

In 2023, the Electoral Commission recommended the establishment of new three seat constituencies of Tipperary North and Tipperary South. Tipperary North would include 13 electoral divisions from County Kilkenny.

For the 2024 general election, the Electoral (Amendment) Act 2023 defines the constituency as:

"In the county of Tipperary, the electoral divisions of:

Aglishcloghane, Ballingarry, Ballylusky, Borrisokane, Carrig, Cloghjordan, Cloghprior, Clohaskin, Finnoe, Graigue, Kilbarron, Lorrha East, Lorrha West, Mertonhall, Rathcabban, Redwood, Riverstown, Terryglass, Uskane, in the former Rural District of Borrisokane;

Clogher, Clonoulty East, Clonoulty West, Gaile, in the former Rural District of Cashel;

Abington, Aghnameadle, Ardcrony, Ballina, Ballygibbon, Ballymackey, Ballynaclogh, Birdhill, Burgesbeg, Carrigatogher, Castletown, Derrycastle, Dolla, Kilcomenty, Kilkeary, Killoscully, Kilmore, Kilnaneave, Kilnarath, Knigh, Lackagh, Latteragh, Monsea, Nenagh Rural, Newport, Templederry, Youghalarra, in the former Rural District of Nenagh;

Borrisnafarney, Borrisnoe, Bourney East, Bourney West, Killavinoge, Killea, Rathnaveoge, Roscrea, Timoney, in the former Rural District of Roscrea No. 1;

Buolick, Fennor, Kilcooly, in the former Rural District of Slieveardagh;

Ballycahill, Borrisoleigh, Drom, Foilnaman, Glenkeen, Gortkelly, Holycross, Inch, Kilrush, Littleton, Longfordpass, Loughmore, Moyaliff, Moycarky, Moyne, Rahelty, Templetouhy, Thurles Rural, Two-mile-Borris, Upperchurch, in the former Rural District of Thurles;

Cappagh, Curraheen, Donohill, Glengar, in the former Rural District of Tipperary No. 1;

Nenagh East Urban, Nenagh West Urban, Templemore, Thurles Urban;

and in the county of Kilkenny, the electoral divisions of:

Ballybeagh, Freshford, Rathealy, Tullaroan, in the former Rural District of Kilkenny;

Balleen, Baunmore, Clomantagh, Galmoy, Glashare, Johnstown, Lisdowney, Tubbridbrittain, Urlingford, in the former Rural District of Urlingford."

Changes to the Tipperary North constituency 1948–2016
Years	TDs	Boundaries	Notes
1948–1961	3	County Tipperary, North Riding	Created from Tipperary
1961–1977	3	County Tipperary, North Riding and in County Tipperary, South Riding the district electoral divisions of: Clonoulty East, in the former Rural District of Cashel; Buolick, Fennor, Kilcooly, New Birmingham, Poyntstown, in the former Rural District of Slievardagh.	Transfer from South Tipperary of the district electoral divisions of: Clonoulty East, in the former Rural District of Cashel; Buolick, Fennor, Kilcooly, New Birmingham, Poyntstown, in the former Rural District of Slievardagh.
1977–1981	3	County Tipperary, North Riding, and in County Tipperary, South Riding the district electoral divisions of: Ballysheehan, Clonoulty East, Gaile, Graystown, Killenaule, Nodstown, in the former Rural District of Cashel; Ballingarry, Ballyphilip, Buolick, Crohane, Farranrory, Fennor, Kilcooly, Modeshil, New Birmingham, Poyntstown, in the former Rural District of Slievardagh.	Transfer from South Tipperary of Ballysheehan, Gaile, Graystown, Killenaule, Nodstown, in the former Rural District of Cashel; Ballingarry, Ballyphilip, Crohane, Farranrory, Modeshil, in the former Rural District of Slievardagh.
1981–1997	3	County Tipperary, North Riding	Transfer to South Tipperary of the district electoral divisions of: Ballysheehan, Clonoulty East, Gaile, Graystown, Killenaule, Nodstown, in the former Rural District of Cashel; Ballingarry, Ballyphilip, Buolick, Crohane, Farranrory, Fennor, Kilcooly, Modeshil, New Birmingham, Poyntstown, in the former Rural District of Slievardagh.
1997–2011	3	County Tipperary, North Riding and in County Tipperary, South Riding, the electoral divisions of: Ballysheehan, Clogher, Clonoulty East, Clonoulty West, Gaile, Graystown, Killenaule, Nodstown, in the former Rural District of Cashel; Ballyphilip, Buolick, Crohane, Farranrory, Fennor, Kilcooly, New Birmingham, Poyntstown, in the former Rural District of Slievardagh. Cappagh, Curraheen, Donohill, Glengar, in the former Rural District of Tipperary No. 1.	Transfer from Tipperary South of The electoral divisions of: Ballysheehan, Clogher, Clonoulty East, Clonoulty West, Gaile, Graystown, Killenaule, Nodstown, in the former Rural District of Cashel; Ballyphilip, Buolick, Crohane, Farranrory, Fennor, Kilcooly, New Birmingham, Poyntstown, in the former Rural District of Slievardagh. Cappagh, Curraheen, Donohill, Glengar, in the former Rural District of Tipperary No. 1.
2011–2016	3	North Tipperary and in South Tipperary the electoral divisions of Ballysheehan, Clogher, Clonoulty East, Clonoulty West, Gaile, Graystown, Killenaule, Nodstown, in the former Rural District of Cashel; Ballyphilip, Buolick, Crohane, Farranrory, Fennor, Kilcooly, New Birmingham, Poyntstown, in the former Rural District of Slievardagh; Cappagh, Curraheen, Donohill, Glengar, in the former Rural District of Tipperary No. 1; and in County Offaly the electoral divisions of Aghacon, Barna, Cangort, Cullenwaine, Dunkerrin, Ettagh, Gorteen, Mountheaton, Shinrone, Templeharry, in the former Rural District of Roscrea No. 2.	Transfer from Laois–Offaly of
2016	—	Constituency abolished	Transfer to Offaly of the following electoral divisions in County Offaly: Aghacon, Barna, Cangort, Cullenwaine, Dunkerrin, Ettagh, Gorteen, Mountheaton, Shinrone, Templeharry, in the former Rural District of Roscrea No. 2 of County Offaly; and the following electoral divisions in County Tipperary: Aglishcloghane, Ballingarry, Ballylusky, Borrisokane, Carrig, Cloghjordan, Cloghprior, Clohaskin, Finnoe, Graigue, Kilbarron, Lorrha East, Lorrha West, Mertonhall, Rathcabban, Redwood, Riverstown, Terryglass, Uskane, in the former Rural District of Borrisokane; Ardcrony, Ballygibbon, Ballymackey, Knigh, Monsea, in the former Rural District of Nenagh. with remainder forming part of the new constituency of Tipperary

== TDs ==
=== TDs 1948–2016 ===
Teachtaí Dála (TDs) for Tipperary North 1948–2016
Key to parties: CnaP = Clann na Poblachta; FF = Fianna Fáil; FG = Fine Gael; Ind. = Independent; Lab = Labour
Dáil	Election	Deputy (Party)	Deputy (Party)	Deputy (Party)
13th	1948	Patrick Kinane (CnaP)	Mary Ryan (FF)	Daniel Morrissey (FG)
14th	1951	John Fanning (FF)	Mary Ryan (FF)	Daniel Morrissey (FG)
15th	1954	John Fanning (FF)	Mary Ryan (FF)	Daniel Morrissey (FG)
16th	1957	John Fanning (FF)	Mary Ryan (FF)	Patrick Tierney (Lab)
17th	1961	John Fanning (FF)	Thomas Dunne (FG)	Patrick Tierney (Lab)
18th	1965	John Fanning (FF)	Thomas Dunne (FG)	Patrick Tierney (Lab)
19th	1969	Michael O'Kennedy (FF)	Thomas Dunne (FG)	Michael Smith (FF)
20th	1973	Michael O'Kennedy (FF)	Thomas Dunne (FG)	John Ryan (Lab)
21st	1977	Michael O'Kennedy (FF)	Michael Smith (FF)	John Ryan (Lab)
22nd	1981	David Molony (FG)	Michael Smith (FF)	John Ryan (Lab)
23rd	1982 (Feb)	David Molony (FG)	Michael O'Kennedy (FF)	John Ryan (Lab)
24th	1982 (Nov)	David Molony (FG)	Michael O'Kennedy (FF)	John Ryan (Lab)
25th	1987	Michael Lowry (FG)	Michael O'Kennedy (FF)	Michael Smith (FF)
26th	1989	Michael Lowry (FG)	Michael O'Kennedy (FF)	Michael Smith (FF)
27th	1992	Michael Lowry (FG)	John Ryan (Lab)	Michael Smith (FF)
28th	1997	Michael Lowry (Ind.)	Michael O'Kennedy (FF)	Michael Smith (FF)
29th	2002	Michael Lowry (Ind.)	Máire Hoctor (FF)	Michael Smith (FF)
30th	2007	Michael Lowry (Ind.)	Máire Hoctor (FF)	Noel Coonan (FG)
31st	2011	Michael Lowry (Ind.)	Alan Kelly (Lab)	Noel Coonan (FG)
32nd	2016	Constituency abolished. See Tipperary and Offaly		

Note: The columns in this table are used only for presentational purposes, and no significance should be attached to the order of columns. For details of the order in which seats were won at each election, see the detailed results of that election.

=== TDs since 2024 ===
Teachtaí Dála (TDs) for Tipperary North 2024–
Key to parties: FF = Fianna Fáil; Ind. = Independent; Lab = Labour
Dáil	Election	Deputy (Party)	Deputy (Party)	Deputy (Party)
34th	2024	Michael Lowry (Ind.)	Alan Kelly (Lab)	Ryan O'Meara (FF)

Note: The columns in this table are used only for presentational purposes, and no significance should be attached to the order of columns. For details of the order in which seats were won at each election, see the detailed results of that election.

== Elections ==
*: Outgoing TD

=== 2024 general election ===
2024 general election: Tipperary North
Party	Candidate	FPv%	Count									
Party	Candidate	FPv%	1	2	3	4	5	6	7	8	9	10
Independent	Michael Lowry	27.4	12,538									
Labour	Alan Kelly	15.4	7,072	7,227	7,268	7,306	7,435	7,792	8,019	9,245	11,089	12,330
Fianna Fáil	Ryan O'Meara	12.4	5,654	5,849	5,883	5,894	5,913	6,002	6,126	6,407	7,785	11,118
Fianna Fáil	Michael Smith	10.7	4,915	5,068	5,088	5,099	5,109	5,149	5,255	5,487	6,361	
Fine Gael	Phyll Bugler	9.7	4,423	4,573	4,587	4,601	4,614	4,753	4,860	5,000		
Independent	Jim Ryan	8.2	3,745	4,019	4,129	4,233	4,285	4,329	4,819	6,002	6,364	7,088
Sinn Féin	Dan Harty	6.6	3,015	3,079	3,111	3,145	3,287	3,360	4,745			
Sinn Féin	Evan Barry	2.9	1,332	1,356	1,369	1,374	1,484	1,515				
Aontú	Francis O'Toole	1.9	890	915	950	1,119	1,166	1,212				
Green	Iva Pocock	1.6	731	737	742	750	865					
PBP–Solidarity	Diana O'Dwyer (Note: O'Dwyer is a member of People Before Profit.)	1.4	632	643	652	676						
The Irish People	Peter Madden	1.0	437	447	500							
Independent	Justin Phelan	0.4	200	215								
Independent	Liam Minehan	0.4	182	196								
Electorate: 70,214 Valid: 45,766 Spoilt: 341 Quota: 11,442 Turnout: 65.7%

=== 2011 general election ===
2011 general election: Tipperary North
Party	Candidate	FPv%	Count		
Party	Candidate	FPv%	1	2	3
Independent	Michael Lowry	29.2	14,104		
Fine Gael	Noel Coonan	23.7	11,425	12,130	
Labour	Alan Kelly	19.8	9,559	10,104	12,065
Fianna Fáil	Máire Hoctor	16.5	7,978	8,356	9,441
Sinn Féin	Séamus Morris	6.3	3,034	3,180	
New Vision	Billy Clancy (Note: New Vision was an electoral alliance of independent non-party candidates and did not appear on the ballot.)	3.0	1,442	1,653	
Green	Olwyn O'Malley	0.8	409	429	
Independent	Kate Bopp	0.7	322	352	
Electorate: 63,235 Valid: 48,273 Spoilt: 516 (1.1%) Quota: 12,069 Turnout: 48,789 (77.2%)

=== 2007 general election ===
2007 general election: Tipperary North
Party	Candidate	FPv%	Count					
Party	Candidate	FPv%	1	2	3	4	5	6
Independent	Michael Lowry	29.1	12,919					
Fianna Fáil	Michael Smith	17.7	7,871	8,107	8,223	8,480	8,975	9,607
Fianna Fáil	Máire Hoctor	16.6	7,374	7,664	7,905	8,249	8,793	10,167
Fine Gael	Noel Coonan	15.9	7,061	7,569	7,763	7,981	8,440	11,499
Labour	Kathleen O'Meara	10.3	4,561	4,859	5,218	5,748	6,311	
Independent	Jim Ryan	4.2	1,844	2,193	2,283	2,564		
Sinn Féin	Séamus Morris	3.8	1,672	1,754	1,881			
Progressive Democrats	Tony Sheary	1.4	634	658				
Green	Paul McNally	1.1	495	519				
Electorate: 57,084 Valid: 44,431 Spoilt: 332 (0.8%) Quota: 11,108 Turnout: 44,783 (78.5%)

=== 2002 general election ===
2002 general election: Tipperary North
Party	Candidate	FPv%	Count			
Party	Candidate	FPv%	1	2	3	4
Independent	Michael Lowry	25.4	10,400			
Fianna Fáil	Máire Hoctor	21.8	8,949	9,320	11,040	
Fine Gael	Noel Coonan	14.9	6,108	6,436	9,085	9,437
Labour	Kathleen O'Meara	13.5	5,537	5,877		
Fianna Fáil	Michael Smith	10.5	8,526	8,842	9,642	10,088
Progressive Democrats	Bill Dwan	3.5	1,446			
Electorate: 59,427 Valid: 40,966 Spoilt: 446 (1.1%) Quota: 10,242 Turnout: 41,412 (69.7%)

=== 1997 general election ===
1997 general election: Tipperary North
Party	Candidate	FPv%	Count						
Party	Candidate	FPv%	1	2	3	4	5	6	7
Independent	Michael Lowry	29.1	11,638						
Fianna Fáil	Michael O'Kennedy	24.8	9,895	10,196					
Fianna Fáil	Michael Smith	17.5	6,999	7,193	7,206	7,321	7,793	8,676	9,754
Fine Gael	Tom Berkery	11.3	4,521	4,966	4,992	5,014	5,212	5,485	8,623
Labour	Kathleen O'Meara	10.3	4,126	4,596	4,622	4,660	4,892	5,218	
Progressive Democrats	Joe Hennessy	3.5	1,390	1,472	1,482	1,498	1,735		
National Party	Margaret Carey	3.2	1,295	1,432	1,448	1,464			
Independent	Gillies MacBain	0.2	88	108					
Electorate: 53,888 Valid: 39,952 Spoilt: 337 (0.8%) Quota: 9,989 Turnout: 40,289 (74.8%)

=== 1992 general election ===
1992 general election: Tipperary North
Party	Candidate	FPv%	Count			
Party	Candidate	FPv%	1	2	3	4
Fianna Fáil	Michael Smith	25.6	8,156			
Fine Gael	Michael Lowry	23.3	7,401	7,422	8,330	
Labour	John Ryan	22.8	7,240	7,375	7,792	8,112
Fianna Fáil	Michael O'Kennedy	22.4	7,113	7,262	7,422	7,475
Fine Gael	Tom Ryan	4.8	1,533	1,551		
Sinn Féin	Jimmy Nolan	1.2	382			
Electorate: 42,754 Valid: 31,825 Spoilt: 465 (1.4%) Quota: 7,957 Turnout: 32,290 (75.5%)

=== 1989 general election ===
1989 general election: Tipperary North
Party	Candidate	FPv%	Count		
Party	Candidate	FPv%	1	2	3
Fianna Fáil	Michael O'Kennedy	28.0	8,855		
Fianna Fáil	Michael Smith	22.8	7,221	8,003	
Labour	John Ryan	22.8	7,215	7,321	7,634
Fine Gael	Michael Lowry	20.3	6,427	6,468	7,991
Fine Gael	Tom Berkery	5.8	1,837	1,852	
Independent	William Fitzsimon	0.3	79	81	
Electorate: 41,382 Valid: 31,634 Quota: 7,909 Turnout: 76.4%

=== 1987 general election ===
1987 general election: Tipperary North
Party	Candidate	FPv%	Count					
Party	Candidate	FPv%	1	2	3	4	5	6
Fianna Fáil	Michael Smith	27.0	8,978					
Fianna Fáil	Michael O'Kennedy	24.4	8,121	8,641				
Fine Gael	Michael Lowry	17.5	5,821	5,849	5,884	6,029	7,490	9,004
Labour	John Ryan	13.7	4,558	4,604	4,713	5,181	5,532	6,429
Progressive Democrats	Frank Dwan	7.3	2,444	2,471	2,528	2,763	2,987	
Fine Gael	Denis Ryan	6.1	2,038	2,061	2,061	2,191		
Sinn Féin	James Nolan	2.6	878	885	931			
Independent	Seán Deegan	1.0	322	325	345			
Independent	Donal Kealy	0.4	131	132	137			
Electorate: 41,555 Valid: 33,291 Quota: 8,323 Turnout: 80.1%

=== November 1982 general election ===
November 1982 general election: Tipperary North
Party	Candidate	FPv%	Count		
Party	Candidate	FPv%	1	2	3
Fianna Fáil	Michael O'Kennedy	24.7	7,945	8,014	8,085
Fianna Fáil	Michael Smith	24.4	7,843	7,895	7,940
Labour	John Ryan	22.3	7,189	7,394	8,124
Fine Gael	David Molony	22.2	7,163	8,899	
Fine Gael	Tom Berkery	6.4	2,071		
Electorate: 39,991 Valid: 32,211 Quota: 8,053 Turnout: 80.5%

=== February 1982 general election ===
February 1982 general election: Tipperary North
Party	Candidate	FPv%	Count				
Party	Candidate	FPv%	1	2	3	4	5
Labour	John Ryan	24.5	7,763	7,812	8,023		
Fianna Fáil	Michael O'Kennedy	22.5	7,126	7,147	7,190	7,198	8,237
Fine Gael	David Molony	20.8	6,602	6,619	7,837	7,912	8,238
Fianna Fáil	Michael Smith	19.5	6,182	6,226	6,269	6,278	7,210
Fianna Fáil	Jane Hanafin	7.2	2,278	2,302	2,361	2,364	
Fine Gael	Tom Berkery	5.0	1,583	1,593			
Independent	Peter Treacy	0.6	175				
Electorate: 39,669 Valid: 31,709 Quota: 7,928 Turnout: 79.9%

=== 1981 general election ===
1981 general election: Tipperary North
Party	Candidate	FPv%	Count			
Party	Candidate	FPv%	1	2	3	4
Fianna Fáil	Michael Smith	26.3	8,502			
Labour	John Ryan	23.2	7,504	7,721	8,206	
Fine Gael	David Molony	21.2	6,850	6,902	7,006	9,300
Fianna Fáil	Des Hanafin	13.3	4,307	4,377	5,721	5,979
Fine Gael	Tom Berkery	8.2	2,637	2,680	2,736	
Fianna Fáil	Ger Ryan	6.1	1,960	2,100		
Independent	Joseph O'Connor	1.8	586			
Electorate: 39,669 Valid: 32,346 Quota: 8,087 Turnout: 81.5%

=== 1977 general election ===
1977 general election: Tipperary North
Party	Candidate	FPv%	Count			
Party	Candidate	FPv%	1	2	3	4
Fianna Fáil	Michael O'Kennedy	26.1	9,218			
Labour	John Ryan	22.6	7,989	8,379	8,754	8,967
Fine Gael	Thomas Dunne	17.8	6,296	7,437	7,863	8,175
Fianna Fáil	Michael Smith	16.1	5,667	5,748	9,353	
Fianna Fáil	Des Hanafin	12.7	4,488	4,514		
Fine Gael	Liam Whyte	4.7	1,652			
Electorate: 42,907 Valid: 35,310 Quota: 8,828 Turnout: 82.3%

Michael O'Kennedy resigned as TD on his appointment as a European Commissioner on 6 January 1981. On 11 February 1981, a motion to move the writ for the vacancy proposed by Noël Browne was opposed by the Fianna Fáil government and was rejected on a vote of 40 to 66. The seat remained vacant until the dissolution of the Dáil on 21 May 1981.

=== 1973 general election ===
1973 general election: Tipperary North
Party	Candidate	FPv%	Count				
Party	Candidate	FPv%	1	2	3	4	5
Fine Gael	Thomas Dunne	22.6	6,397	7,901			
Fianna Fáil	Michael O'Kennedy	20.1	5,709	5,809	7,935		
Labour	John Ryan	19.1	5,427	5,879	6,189	6,975	7,088
Fianna Fáil	Michael Smith	17.6	4,976	5,053	6,086	6,130	6,895
Fianna Fáil	John Doyle	12.9	3,645	3,699			
Fine Gael	Liam Whyte	7.8	2,198				
Electorate: 34,754 Valid: 28,352 Quota: 7,089 Turnout: 81.6%

=== 1969 general election ===
1969 general election: Tipperary North
Party	Candidate	FPv%	Count					
Party	Candidate	FPv%	1	2	3	4	5	6
Fianna Fáil	Michael O'Kennedy	30.3	8,751					
Fine Gael	Thomas Dunne	24.8	7,169	7,271				
Fianna Fáil	Michael Smith	13.4	3,872	4,500	4,530	4,690	5,047	7,538
Fianna Fáil	John Doyle	9.5	2,738	3,218	3,305	3,364	3,528	
Fine Gael	Liam Whyte	9.3	2,673	2,744	2,873	2,935		
Labour	John Ryan	8.7	2,498	2,720	2,900	3,281	4,309	4,586
Labour	Thomas Shanahan	2.2	651	665	728			
Labour	Rickard Deasy	1.8	517	533				
Electorate: 34,814 Valid: 28,869 Quota: 7,218 Turnout: 82.9%

=== 1965 general election ===
1965 general election: Tipperary North
Party	Candidate	FPv%	Count		
Party	Candidate	FPv%	1	2	3
Fianna Fáil	John Fanning	24.0	6,411	6,497	6,616
Fine Gael	Thomas Dunne	23.8	6,377	8,671	
Labour	Patrick Tierney	20.4	5,466	5,893	7,231
Fianna Fáil	Michael O'Kennedy	20.2	5,411	5,669	5,889
Fine Gael	Donal Nealon	11.6	3,101		
Electorate: 33,769 Valid: 26,766 Quota: 6,692 Turnout: 79.3%

=== 1961 general election ===
1961 general election: Tipperary North
Party	Candidate	FPv%	Count		
Party	Candidate	FPv%	1	2	3
Fianna Fáil	John Fanning	24.5	6,302	6,435	
Labour	Patrick Tierney	21.9	5,642	6,070	6,531
Fianna Fáil	Mary Ryan	21.7	5,570	5,770	5,900
Fine Gael	Thomas Dunne	16.9	4,336	4,449	6,622
Fine Gael	William Whyte	10.7	2,754	2,844	
Sinn Féin	Tomás Mac Giolla	4.4	1,123		
Electorate: 33,892 Valid: 25,727 Quota: 6,432 Turnout: 75.9%

=== 1957 general election ===
1957 general election: Tipperary North
Party	Candidate	FPv%	Count					
Party	Candidate	FPv%	1	2	3	4	5	6
Fianna Fáil	John Fanning	24.0	6,464	6,553	6,864			
Fianna Fáil	Mary Ryan	22.5	6,058	6,531	6,663	7,677		
Labour	Patrick Tierney	15.8	4,261	4,517	4,730	5,837	5,904	6,230
Fine Gael	Martin Collins	13.0	3,497	3,644	5,569	5,940	5,991	6,070
Fine Gael	Thomas Dunne	9.7	2,616	2,752				
Sinn Féin	Aindrias MacDomhnaill	9.4	2,548	2,938	3,038			
Clann na Poblachta	Daniel Kennedy	5.7	1,537					
Electorate: 33,520 Valid: 26,981 Quota: 6,746 Turnout: 80.5%

=== 1954 general election ===
1954 general election: Tipperary North
Party	Candidate	FPv%	Count			
Party	Candidate	FPv%	1	2	3	4
Fianna Fáil	Mary Ryan	23.0	6,494	6,566	6,628	7,175
Fianna Fáil	John Fanning	21.7	6,133	6,243	6,455	6,837
Fine Gael	Daniel Morrissey	20.7	5,843	6,052	7,687	
Labour	Patrick Tierney	16.8	4,756	4,953	5,024	5,958
Fine Gael	Lawrence Brennan	7.7	2,176	2,199		
Clann na Poblachta	Patrick Kinane	6.7	1,898	2,206	2,392	
Clann na Poblachta	Michael Cronin	3.3	935			
Electorate: 34,378 Valid: 28,235 Quota: 7,059 Turnout: 82.1%

=== 1951 general election ===
1951 general election: Tipperary North
Party	Candidate	FPv%	Count			
Party	Candidate	FPv%	1	2	3	4
Fine Gael	Daniel Morrissey	23.0	6,546	7,538		
Fianna Fáil	John Fanning	22.5	6,390	6,573	6,586	7,277
Fianna Fáil	Mary Ryan	21.9	6,215	6,486	6,532	6,939
Labour	Patrick Tierney	13.3	3,782	4,318	4,408	6,108
Fine Gael	Jeremiah Ryan	10.2	2,902	3,443	3,722	
Clann na Poblachta	Patrick Kinane	9.2	2,601			
Electorate: 34,957 Valid: 28,436 Quota: 7,110 Turnout: 81.45%

=== 1948 general election ===
1948 general election: Tipperary North
Party	Candidate	FPv%	Count						
Party	Candidate	FPv%	1	2	3	4	5	6	7
Fine Gael	Daniel Morrissey	20.0	5,656	6,191	6,346	6,442	7,321		
Clann na Poblachta	Patrick Kinane	16.3	4,602	4,645	5,817	5,889	7,827		
Fianna Fáil	Mary Ryan	16.3	4,601	4,631	4,674	5,816	6,444	6,782	6,915
Labour	John Murphy	15.6	4,408	4,446	4,525	4,609			
Fianna Fáil	Andrew Fogarty	15.5	4,377	4,395	4,547	5,395	6,298	6,688	6,821
Fianna Fáil	Thomas J. MacDonagh	7.9	2,227	2,234	2,273				
Clann na Poblachta	Michael Cronin	5.8	1,638	1,663					
Fine Gael	Joubert Powell	2.5	708						
Electorate: 35,315 Valid: 28,217 Quota: 7,055 Turnout: 79.9%

== See also ==
- Dáil constituencies
- Politics of the Republic of Ireland
- Historic Dáil constituencies
- Elections in the Republic of Ireland
