= Kathleen O'Meara (politician) =

Irish former politician (born 1960)

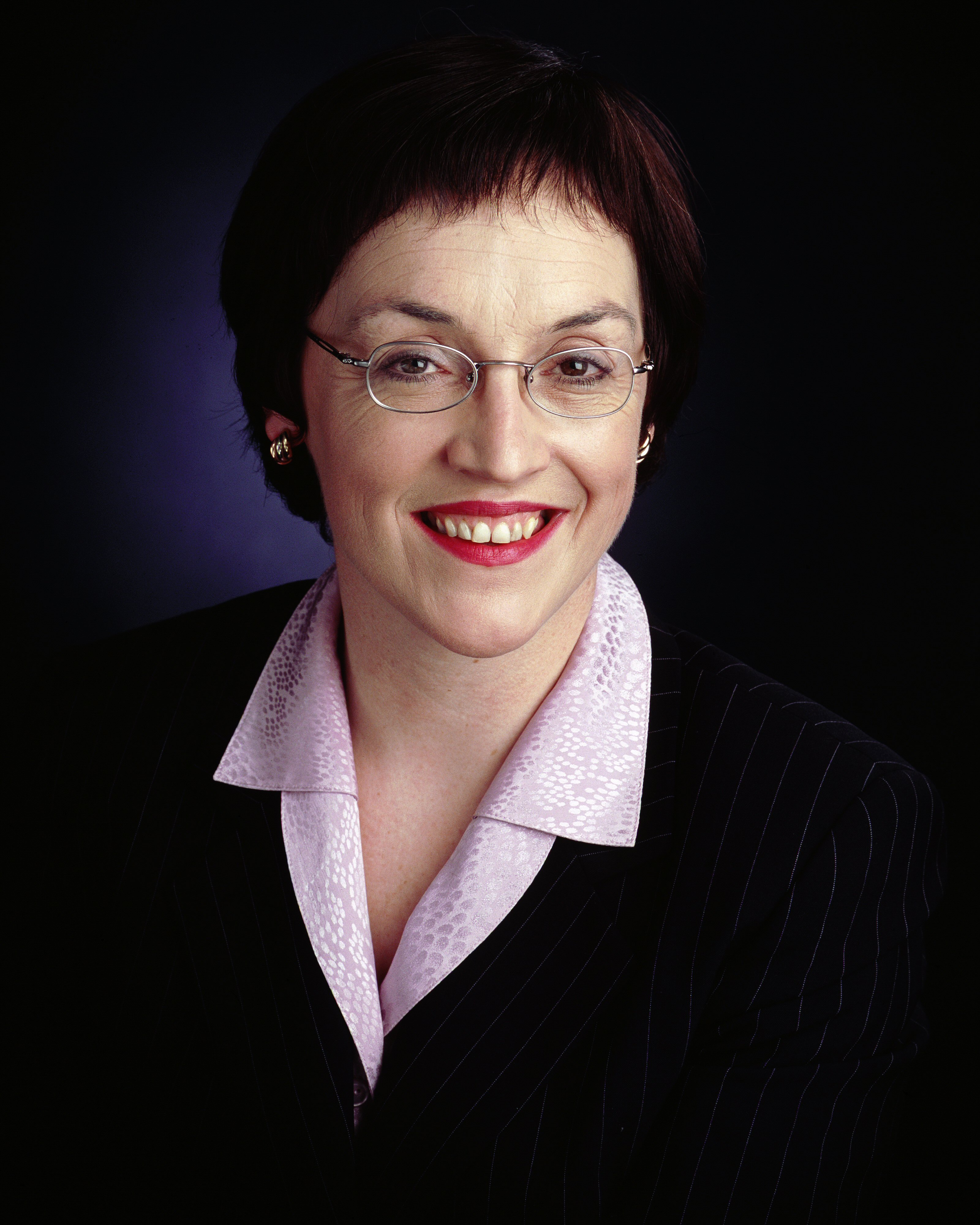
- O'Meara, c. 2002

Senator
- In office 17 September 1997 – 13 September 2007
- Constituency: Agricultural Panel

Personal details
- Born: 24 January 1960 (age 66) County Tipperary, Ireland
- Party: Labour Party
- Spouse: Kevin Dolan
- Children: 2

Kathleen O'Meara (born 24 January 1960) is an Irish former Labour Party politician. She was a member of Seanad Éireann from 1997 to 2007. On both occasions she was elected by the Agricultural Panel.

== Career ==
During the mid-1980s, O'Meara worked for the Labour Party. In 1988, she began working as an RTÉ journalist.

At the 1997 general election, O'Meara was an unsuccessful candidate in the Tipperary North constituency. At the 1999 local elections, she was elected to Nenagh Town Council. She was a candidate again for Dáil Éireann at the 2002 general election, increasing her share of the vote from 10.3% to 13.5%, but again failing to be elected.

During her second term in the Seanad (2002–2007) O'Meara came to national prominence as a health campaigner. She drove the Nenagh Hospital Action Group, one of many groups formed to oppose Government health policy, contained in the Hanly report, to remove emergency services from smaller general hospitals. She was the Labour Party's front-bench spokesperson on Childcare from 2003 to 2007. She was the whip of the Labour group in Seanad Éireann. She was an unsuccessful candidate at the 2007 general election for Tipperary North, getting 10.3% of the vote. She did not contest the Seanad elections in 2007.

Following the 2007 election, O'Meara set up Alchemy Communications, a consultancy, with two other experienced public relations and communications consultants. Since September 2008, she is head of Advocacy and Communications for the Irish Cancer Society.

In 2011, O'Meara unsuccessfully sought the Labour Party nomination for the 2011 presidential election. The nomination went to party president and former TD, Michael D. Higgins.

== Personal life ==
O'Meara was born a triplet, and the identical twin of journalist Aileen O'Meara. She is a graduate of NUI Galway. She is married and has two children with her husband Kevin.
