= Máire Hoctor =

Irish former politician (born 1963)

Minister of State
- 2007–2009: Social and Family Affairs
- 2007–2009: Health and Children
- 2007–2009: Environment, Heritage and Local Government

Teachta Dála
- In office May 2002 – February 2011
- Constituency: Tipperary North

Personal details
- Born: 20 January 1963 (age 63) Nenagh, County Tipperary, Ireland
- Party: Fianna Fáil
- Education: St Patrick's College, Maynooth
- Profession: Teacher

Máire Hoctor (born 20 January 1963) is an Irish former Fianna Fáil politician. She was a Teachta Dála (TD) for the Tipperary North constituency from 2002 to 2011.

She was educated at St. Mary's secondary school, Nenagh and St Patrick's College, Maynooth. Before her election she worked as a secondary school teacher in St. Joseph's CBS, Nenagh.

Hoctor was elected to Dáil Éireann as a Fianna Fáil TD for Tipperary North at the 2002 general election. She was re-elected at the 2007 general election. She is a former member of North Tipperary County Council and of Nenagh Town Council.

Hoctor was a member of various Oireachtas Committees at different stages in the 2002–07 Fianna Fáil–Progressive Democrats government.

In 2007, legislation was passed to increase the number of Ministers of State from 17 to 20, and in July 2007 Hoctor was nominated by Bertie Ahern to be appointed by the government as Minister of State at the Department of Social and Family Affairs, at the Department of Health and Children, and at the Department of the Environment, Heritage and Local Government, with special responsibility for Older People. She was re-appointed to the same positions in 2008, but in April 2009, she was not re-appointed, after Brian Cowen requested the resignation of all Ministers of State to reduce the number from 20 to 15.

She lost her seat at the 2011 general election.

Dáil	Election	Deputy (Party)	Deputy (Party)	Deputy (Party)
13th	1948	Patrick Kinane (CnaP)	Mary Ryan (FF)	Daniel Morrissey (FG)
14th	1951	John Fanning (FF)	Mary Ryan (FF)	Daniel Morrissey (FG)
15th	1954	John Fanning (FF)	Mary Ryan (FF)	Daniel Morrissey (FG)
16th	1957	John Fanning (FF)	Mary Ryan (FF)	Patrick Tierney (Lab)
17th	1961	John Fanning (FF)	Thomas Dunne (FG)	Patrick Tierney (Lab)
18th	1965	John Fanning (FF)	Thomas Dunne (FG)	Patrick Tierney (Lab)
19th	1969	Michael O'Kennedy (FF)	Thomas Dunne (FG)	Michael Smith (FF)
20th	1973	Michael O'Kennedy (FF)	Thomas Dunne (FG)	John Ryan (Lab)
21st	1977	Michael O'Kennedy (FF)	Michael Smith (FF)	John Ryan (Lab)
22nd	1981	David Molony (FG)	Michael Smith (FF)	John Ryan (Lab)
23rd	1982 (Feb)	David Molony (FG)	Michael O'Kennedy (FF)	John Ryan (Lab)
24th	1982 (Nov)	David Molony (FG)	Michael O'Kennedy (FF)	John Ryan (Lab)
25th	1987	Michael Lowry (FG)	Michael O'Kennedy (FF)	Michael Smith (FF)
26th	1989	Michael Lowry (FG)	Michael O'Kennedy (FF)	Michael Smith (FF)
27th	1992	Michael Lowry (FG)	John Ryan (Lab)	Michael Smith (FF)
28th	1997	Michael Lowry (Ind.)	Michael O'Kennedy (FF)	Michael Smith (FF)
29th	2002	Michael Lowry (Ind.)	Máire Hoctor (FF)	Michael Smith (FF)
30th	2007	Michael Lowry (Ind.)	Máire Hoctor (FF)	Noel Coonan (FG)
31st	2011	Michael Lowry (Ind.)	Alan Kelly (Lab)	Noel Coonan (FG)
32nd	2016	Constituency abolished. See Tipperary and Offaly		

Dáil	Election	Deputy (Party)	Deputy (Party)	Deputy (Party)
34th	2024	Michael Lowry (Ind.)	Alan Kelly (Lab)	Ryan O'Meara (FF)
