= Michael Smith (Irish politician) =

Irish former politician (born 1940)

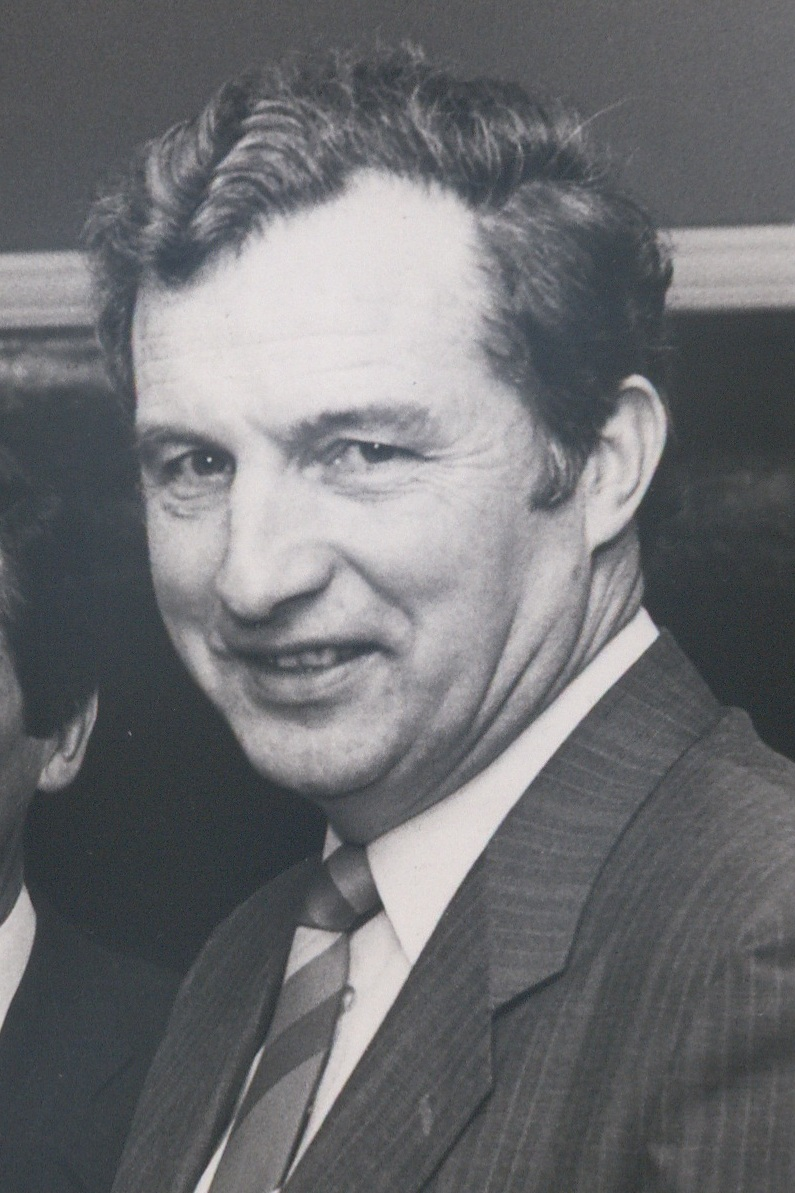
- Smith in 1990

Minister for Defence
- In office 8 October 1997 – 29 September 2004
- Taoiseach: Bertie Ahern
- Preceded by: David Andrews
- Succeeded by: Willie O'Dea

Minister for Education
- In office 18 November – 15 December 1994
- Taoiseach: Albert Reynolds
- Preceded by: Niamh Bhreathnach
- Succeeded by: Niamh Bhreathnach

Minister for the Environment
- In office 14 February 1992 – 14 December 1994
- Taoiseach: Albert Reynolds
- Preceded by: Rory O'Hanlon
- Succeeded by: Brendan Howlin

Minister for Energy
- In office 24 November 1988 – 12 July 1989
- Taoiseach: Charles Haughey

Minister of State
- July–Oct. 1997: Education and Science
- July–Oct. 1997: Enterprise, Trade and Employment
- 1989–1991: Industry and Commerce
- 1987–1988: Energy
- March 1987: Tourism, Fisheries and Forestry
- 1980–1981: Agriculture

Teachta Dála
- In office February 1987 – May 2007
- In office June 1977 – February 1982
- In office June 1969 – February 1973
- Constituency: Tipperary North

Senator
- In office 23 February 1983 – 17 February 1987
- Constituency: Cultural and Educational Panel
- In office 13 May 1982 – 23 February 1983
- Constituency: Agricultural Panel

Personal details
- Born: 8 November 1940 (age 85) Roscrea, County Tipperary, Ireland
- Party: Fianna Fáil
- Spouse: Mary Smith (m. 1970)
- Children: 7
- Education: CBS Templemore

Michael Smith (born 8 November 1940) is an Irish former Fianna Fáil politician who served as Minister for Defence from 1997 to 2004, Minister for Education from November 1994 to December 1994, Minister for the Environment from 1992 to 1994 and a Minister of State in various governments. He served as a Teachta Dála (TD) for the Tipperary North constituency from 1969 to 1973, 1977 to 1981 and 1987 to 2002. He also served as a Senator for the Cultural and Educational Panel from 1983 to 1987 and for the Agricultural Panel from May 1982 to December 1982.

== Background and education ==
Smith was born in Roscrea, County Tipperary in 1940. He was educated at CBS Templemore in County Tipperary. For many years, Smith claimed to be a graduate of University College Cork but this was disproven in 2004.

Smith worked as a farmer before entering Dáil Éireann at the 1969 general election as a Fianna Fáil TD for the Tipperary North constituency.

He lost his seat at the 1973 general election but was re-elected to Dáil Éireann at the 1977 general election.

== Political career ==
=== 1980s ===
In 1980, the Taoiseach Charles Haughey appointed him Minister of State at the Department of Agriculture. Smith lost his Dáil seat again at the February 1982 general election, and failed to regain it at the November 1982 general election. He spent the next five years as a Senator in Seanad Éireann, elected first by the Agricultural Panel and then by the Cultural and Educational Panel, before his re-election to the Dáil at the 1987 general election.

When Smith was returned to the Dáil in 1987, he was appointed Minister of State at the Department of Energy. He was appointed to cabinet as the Minister for Energy in 1988. His stay in cabinet was brief; following the 1989 general election he was demoted to Minister of State at the Department of Industry and Commerce.

=== 1992–2007 ===
In February 1992, he returned to cabinet for two years as Minister for the Environment. He held office until Fianna Fáil left government in December 1994.

After the 1997 election, Fianna Fáil returned to government and Smith was appointed as Minister of State at the Department of Education and Science. In October 1997, he replaced David Andrews as Minister for Defence, and held that position until he was dropped from the cabinet in a reshuffle in 2004. During his tenure Smith dealt with the Army deafness compensation issue that ultimately resulted in claims of €300 million against the State.

At the 2007 general election he lost his seat to Noel Coonan of Fine Gael.

Political offices
Preceded by Thomas Hussey	Minister of State at the Department of Agriculture; 1980–1981	Vacant
New office	Minister of State at the Department of Tourism, Fisheries and Forestry; March 1987	Vacant
New office	Minister of State at the Department of Energy; 1987–1988	Succeeded by Liam Aylward
Preceded by Ray Burke	Minister for Energy; 1988–1989	Succeeded by Bobby Molloy
Preceded by Seán McCarthy	Minister of State at the Department of Industry and Commerce; 1989–1991	Vacant
Preceded by Rory O'Hanlon	Minister for the Environment; 1992–1994	Succeeded by Brendan Howlin
Preceded by Niamh Bhreathnach	Minister for Education; 1994	Succeeded by Niamh Bhreathnach
New office	Minister of State at the Department of Education and Science; Jul.–Oct 1997	Succeeded by Noel Treacy
Preceded by David Andrews	Minister for Defence; 1997–2004	Succeeded by Willie O'Dea

Dáil	Election	Deputy (Party)	Deputy (Party)	Deputy (Party)
13th	1948	Patrick Kinane (CnaP)	Mary Ryan (FF)	Daniel Morrissey (FG)
14th	1951	John Fanning (FF)	Mary Ryan (FF)	Daniel Morrissey (FG)
15th	1954	John Fanning (FF)	Mary Ryan (FF)	Daniel Morrissey (FG)
16th	1957	John Fanning (FF)	Mary Ryan (FF)	Patrick Tierney (Lab)
17th	1961	John Fanning (FF)	Thomas Dunne (FG)	Patrick Tierney (Lab)
18th	1965	John Fanning (FF)	Thomas Dunne (FG)	Patrick Tierney (Lab)
19th	1969	Michael O'Kennedy (FF)	Thomas Dunne (FG)	Michael Smith (FF)
20th	1973	Michael O'Kennedy (FF)	Thomas Dunne (FG)	John Ryan (Lab)
21st	1977	Michael O'Kennedy (FF)	Michael Smith (FF)	John Ryan (Lab)
22nd	1981	David Molony (FG)	Michael Smith (FF)	John Ryan (Lab)
23rd	1982 (Feb)	David Molony (FG)	Michael O'Kennedy (FF)	John Ryan (Lab)
24th	1982 (Nov)	David Molony (FG)	Michael O'Kennedy (FF)	John Ryan (Lab)
25th	1987	Michael Lowry (FG)	Michael O'Kennedy (FF)	Michael Smith (FF)
26th	1989	Michael Lowry (FG)	Michael O'Kennedy (FF)	Michael Smith (FF)
27th	1992	Michael Lowry (FG)	John Ryan (Lab)	Michael Smith (FF)
28th	1997	Michael Lowry (Ind.)	Michael O'Kennedy (FF)	Michael Smith (FF)
29th	2002	Michael Lowry (Ind.)	Máire Hoctor (FF)	Michael Smith (FF)
30th	2007	Michael Lowry (Ind.)	Máire Hoctor (FF)	Noel Coonan (FG)
31st	2011	Michael Lowry (Ind.)	Alan Kelly (Lab)	Noel Coonan (FG)
32nd	2016	Constituency abolished. See Tipperary and Offaly		

Dáil	Election	Deputy (Party)	Deputy (Party)	Deputy (Party)
34th	2024	Michael Lowry (Ind.)	Alan Kelly (Lab)	Ryan O'Meara (FF)
