= John Ryan (Irish politician) =

Irish politician (1927–2014)

Leas-Cheann Comhairle of Dáil Éireann
- In office 15 December 1982 – 10 March 1987
- Ceann Comhairle: Thomas J. Fitzpatrick
- Preceded by: Jim Tunney
- Succeeded by: Jim Tunney

Senator
- In office 1 November 1989 – 25 November 1992
- Constituency: Industrial and Commercial Panel

Teachta Dála
- In office November 1992 – June 1997
- In office February 1973 – February 1987
- Constituency: Tipperary North

Personal details
- Born: 17 June 1927 Nenagh, County Tipperary, Ireland
- Died: 3 April 2014 (aged 86) County Tipperary, Ireland
- Party: Labour Party
- Spouse: Ina Ryan
- Children: 3

John Joseph Ryan (17 June 1927 – 3 April 2014) was an Irish Labour Party politician from Nenagh, County Tipperary. He was an unsuccessful candidate at the 1969 general election, but was elected to Dáil Éireann at the 1973 general election as a Teachta Dála (TD) for the Tipperary North constituency. He was re-elected at each subsequent general election until he lost his seat at the 1987 general election.

He was elected to the Industrial and Commercial Panel of the 19th Seanad in 1989. At the 1992 general election he re-gained his Dáil seat in Tipperary North. He retired at the 1997 general election. He served as Leas-Cheann Comhairle (deputy chairperson) of the Dáil from 1982 to 1987. He died in 2014 at the age of 86.

Dáil	Election	Deputy (Party)	Deputy (Party)	Deputy (Party)
13th	1948	Patrick Kinane (CnaP)	Mary Ryan (FF)	Daniel Morrissey (FG)
14th	1951	John Fanning (FF)	Mary Ryan (FF)	Daniel Morrissey (FG)
15th	1954	John Fanning (FF)	Mary Ryan (FF)	Daniel Morrissey (FG)
16th	1957	John Fanning (FF)	Mary Ryan (FF)	Patrick Tierney (Lab)
17th	1961	John Fanning (FF)	Thomas Dunne (FG)	Patrick Tierney (Lab)
18th	1965	John Fanning (FF)	Thomas Dunne (FG)	Patrick Tierney (Lab)
19th	1969	Michael O'Kennedy (FF)	Thomas Dunne (FG)	Michael Smith (FF)
20th	1973	Michael O'Kennedy (FF)	Thomas Dunne (FG)	John Ryan (Lab)
21st	1977	Michael O'Kennedy (FF)	Michael Smith (FF)	John Ryan (Lab)
22nd	1981	David Molony (FG)	Michael Smith (FF)	John Ryan (Lab)
23rd	1982 (Feb)	David Molony (FG)	Michael O'Kennedy (FF)	John Ryan (Lab)
24th	1982 (Nov)	David Molony (FG)	Michael O'Kennedy (FF)	John Ryan (Lab)
25th	1987	Michael Lowry (FG)	Michael O'Kennedy (FF)	Michael Smith (FF)
26th	1989	Michael Lowry (FG)	Michael O'Kennedy (FF)	Michael Smith (FF)
27th	1992	Michael Lowry (FG)	John Ryan (Lab)	Michael Smith (FF)
28th	1997	Michael Lowry (Ind.)	Michael O'Kennedy (FF)	Michael Smith (FF)
29th	2002	Michael Lowry (Ind.)	Máire Hoctor (FF)	Michael Smith (FF)
30th	2007	Michael Lowry (Ind.)	Máire Hoctor (FF)	Noel Coonan (FG)
31st	2011	Michael Lowry (Ind.)	Alan Kelly (Lab)	Noel Coonan (FG)
32nd	2016	Constituency abolished. See Tipperary and Offaly		

Dáil	Election	Deputy (Party)	Deputy (Party)	Deputy (Party)
34th	2024	Michael Lowry (Ind.)	Alan Kelly (Lab)	Ryan O'Meara (FF)
