= Ryan O'Meara (politician) =

Irish politician

Ryan O'Meara TD
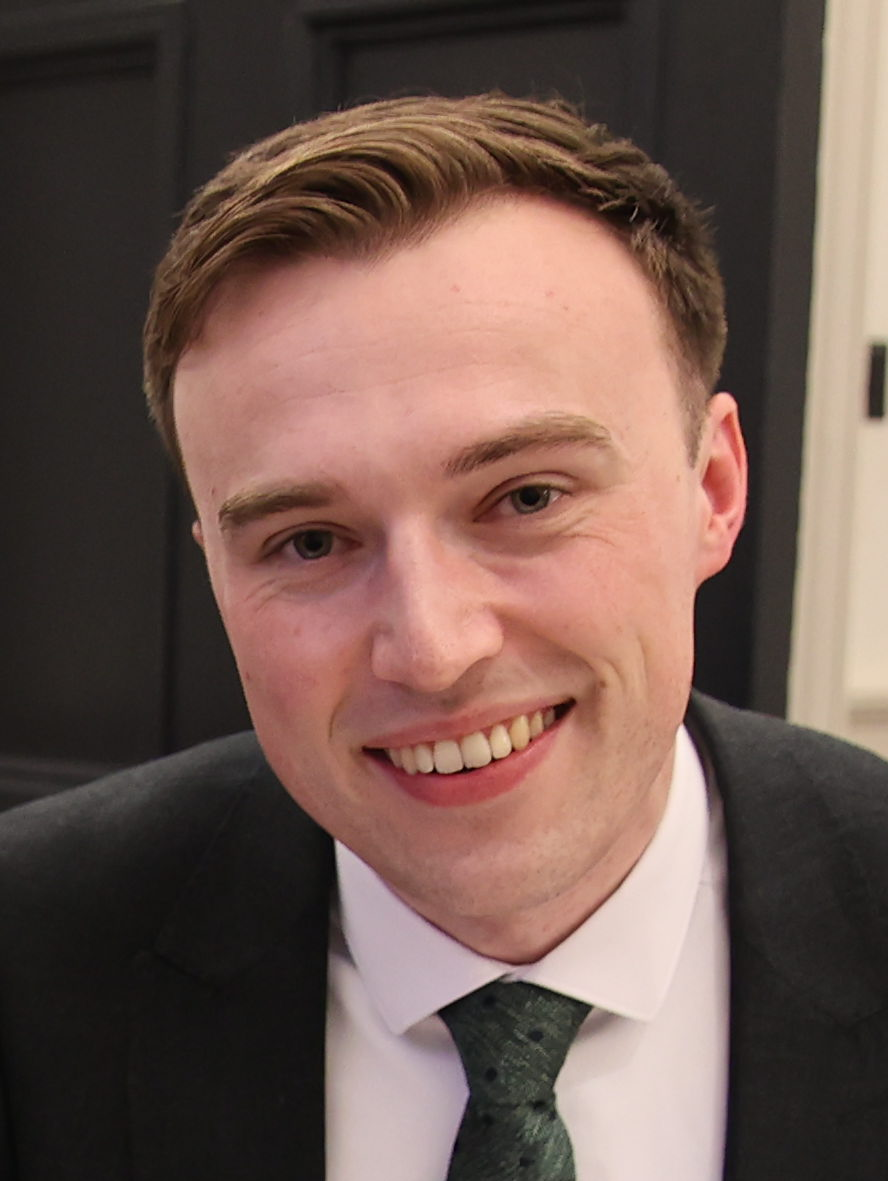
- O'Meara in 2024

Teachta Dála
- Incumbent
- Assumed office November 2024
- Constituency: Tipperary North

Tipperary County Councillor
- In office June 2024 – November 2024
- Constituency: Nenagh

Personal details
- Born: 1994/1995 (age 30–31)
- Party: Fianna Fáil

Ryan O'Meara (born 1994/1995) is an Irish Fianna Fáil politician who has been a Teachta Dála (TD) for the Tipperary North constituency since the 2024 general election.

O'Meara was elected to Tipperary County Council at the 2024 local elections. He previously worked as a parliamentary assistant to Fianna Fáil TD Jackie Cahill, who did not contest the 2024 general election.

Dáil	Election	Deputy (Party)	Deputy (Party)	Deputy (Party)
13th	1948	Patrick Kinane (CnaP)	Mary Ryan (FF)	Daniel Morrissey (FG)
14th	1951	John Fanning (FF)	Mary Ryan (FF)	Daniel Morrissey (FG)
15th	1954	John Fanning (FF)	Mary Ryan (FF)	Daniel Morrissey (FG)
16th	1957	John Fanning (FF)	Mary Ryan (FF)	Patrick Tierney (Lab)
17th	1961	John Fanning (FF)	Thomas Dunne (FG)	Patrick Tierney (Lab)
18th	1965	John Fanning (FF)	Thomas Dunne (FG)	Patrick Tierney (Lab)
19th	1969	Michael O'Kennedy (FF)	Thomas Dunne (FG)	Michael Smith (FF)
20th	1973	Michael O'Kennedy (FF)	Thomas Dunne (FG)	John Ryan (Lab)
21st	1977	Michael O'Kennedy (FF)	Michael Smith (FF)	John Ryan (Lab)
22nd	1981	David Molony (FG)	Michael Smith (FF)	John Ryan (Lab)
23rd	1982 (Feb)	David Molony (FG)	Michael O'Kennedy (FF)	John Ryan (Lab)
24th	1982 (Nov)	David Molony (FG)	Michael O'Kennedy (FF)	John Ryan (Lab)
25th	1987	Michael Lowry (FG)	Michael O'Kennedy (FF)	Michael Smith (FF)
26th	1989	Michael Lowry (FG)	Michael O'Kennedy (FF)	Michael Smith (FF)
27th	1992	Michael Lowry (FG)	John Ryan (Lab)	Michael Smith (FF)
28th	1997	Michael Lowry (Ind.)	Michael O'Kennedy (FF)	Michael Smith (FF)
29th	2002	Michael Lowry (Ind.)	Máire Hoctor (FF)	Michael Smith (FF)
30th	2007	Michael Lowry (Ind.)	Máire Hoctor (FF)	Noel Coonan (FG)
31st	2011	Michael Lowry (Ind.)	Alan Kelly (Lab)	Noel Coonan (FG)
32nd	2016	Constituency abolished. See Tipperary and Offaly		

Dáil	Election	Deputy (Party)	Deputy (Party)	Deputy (Party)
34th	2024	Michael Lowry (Ind.)	Alan Kelly (Lab)	Ryan O'Meara (FF)
