= Tom Berkery =

Irish politician (born 1953)

Senator
- In office 13 June 1997 – 17 September 1997
- Constituency: Nominated by the Taoiseach

Personal details
- Born: 1953 (age 71–72); County Tipperary, Ireland
- Political party: Fine Gael

Thomas Berkery (born 1953) is a Fine Gael politician from Nenagh in County Tipperary in Ireland. He is a former local councillor, and was briefly a Senator in 1997.

A farmer, auctioneer, and long-serving member of North Tipperary County Council, Berkery lost his council seat in the 1991 local elections, but was re-elected at the 1999 and 2004 local elections. He lost his seat at the 2009 local elections and stood unsuccessfully at the 2014 local elections.

Berkery was an unsuccessful Fine Gael candidate for Dáil Éireann in the Tipperary North constituency at five general elections: 1981, February 1982, November 1982, 1989 and 1997.
