= 1969 Irish general election =

Election to the 19th Dáil

- 18 June 1969

144 seats in Dáil Éireann (Note: Including Cormac Breslin (FF), returned automatically for Donegal–Leitrim as outgoing Ceann Comhairle, under Art. 16.6 of the Constitution and the Electoral Act 1963, as adapted by the Electoral (Amendment) Act 1969.) 73 seats needed for a majority
- Turnout: 76.9% ▲1.8 pp
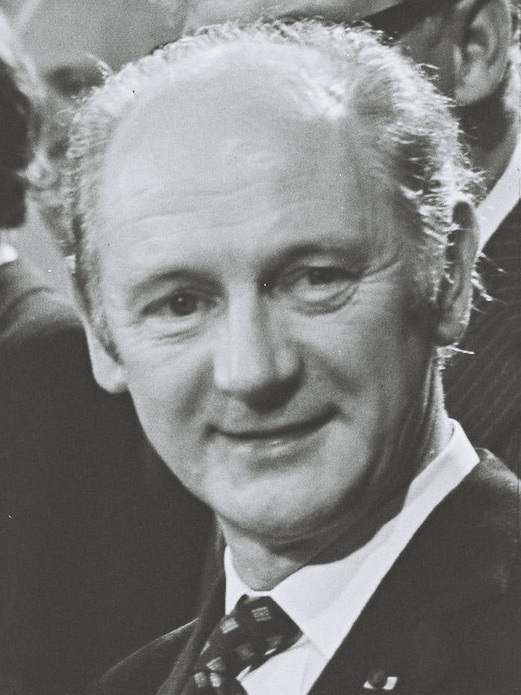

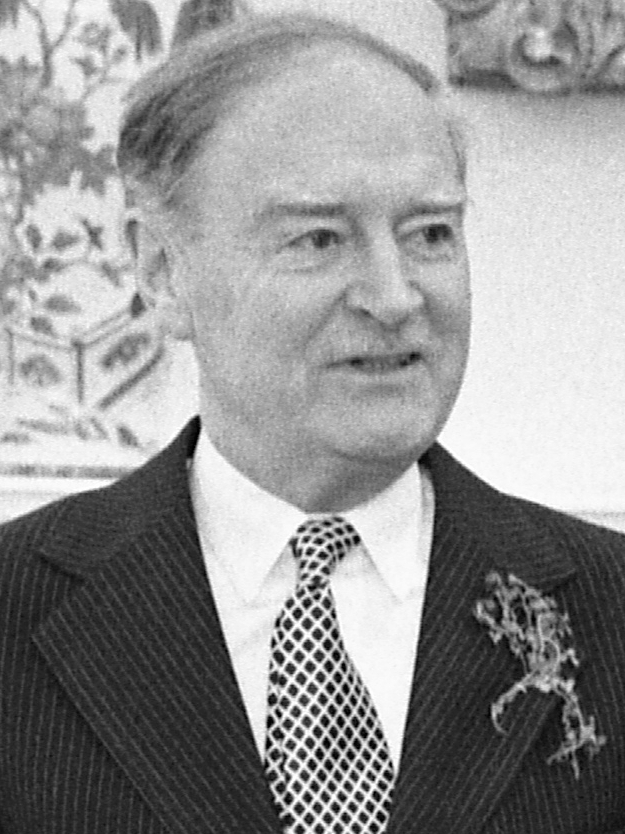

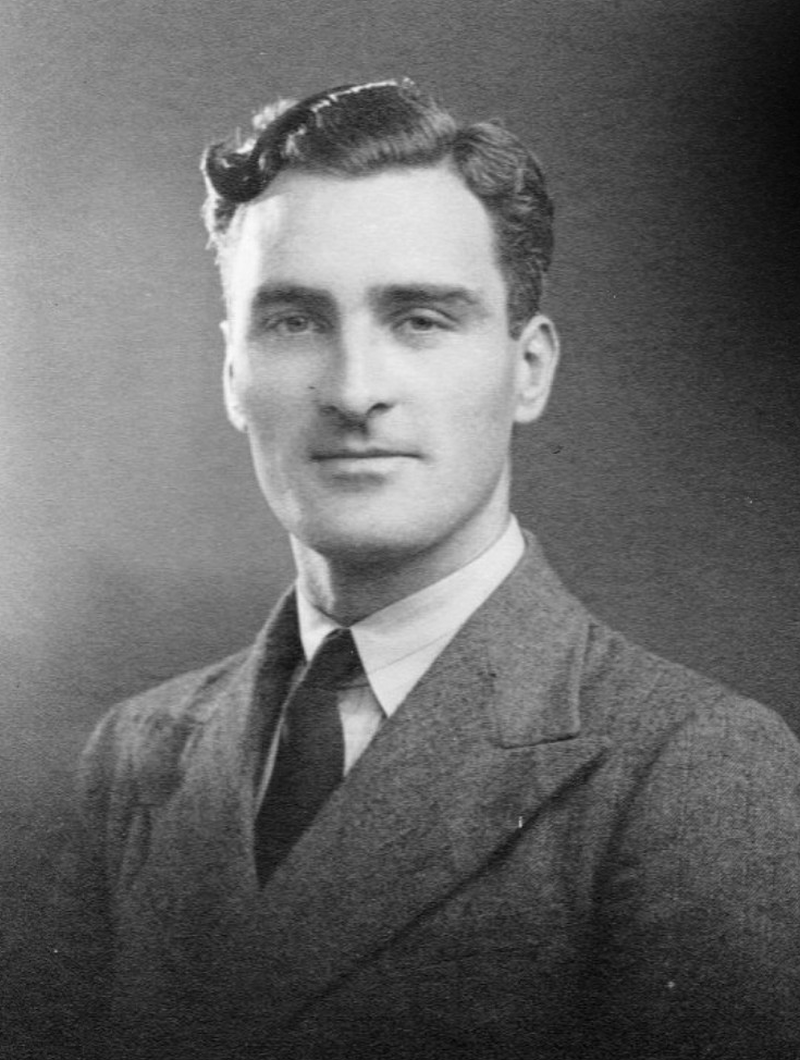
	First party	Second party	Third party
Leader	Jack Lynch	Liam Cosgrave	Brendan Corish
Party	Fianna Fáil	Fine Gael	Labour
Leader since	9 November 1966	21 April 1965	2 March 1960
Leader's seat	Cork City North-West	Dún Laoghaire and Rathdown	Wexford
Last election	72 seats, 47.7%	47 seats, 34.1%	22 seats, 15.4%
Seats won	75	50	18
Seat change	▲3	▲3	▼4
Popular vote	602,234	449,749	224,498
Percentage	45.7%	34.1%	17.0%
Swing	▼2.0 pp	0.0 pp	▲1.6 pp
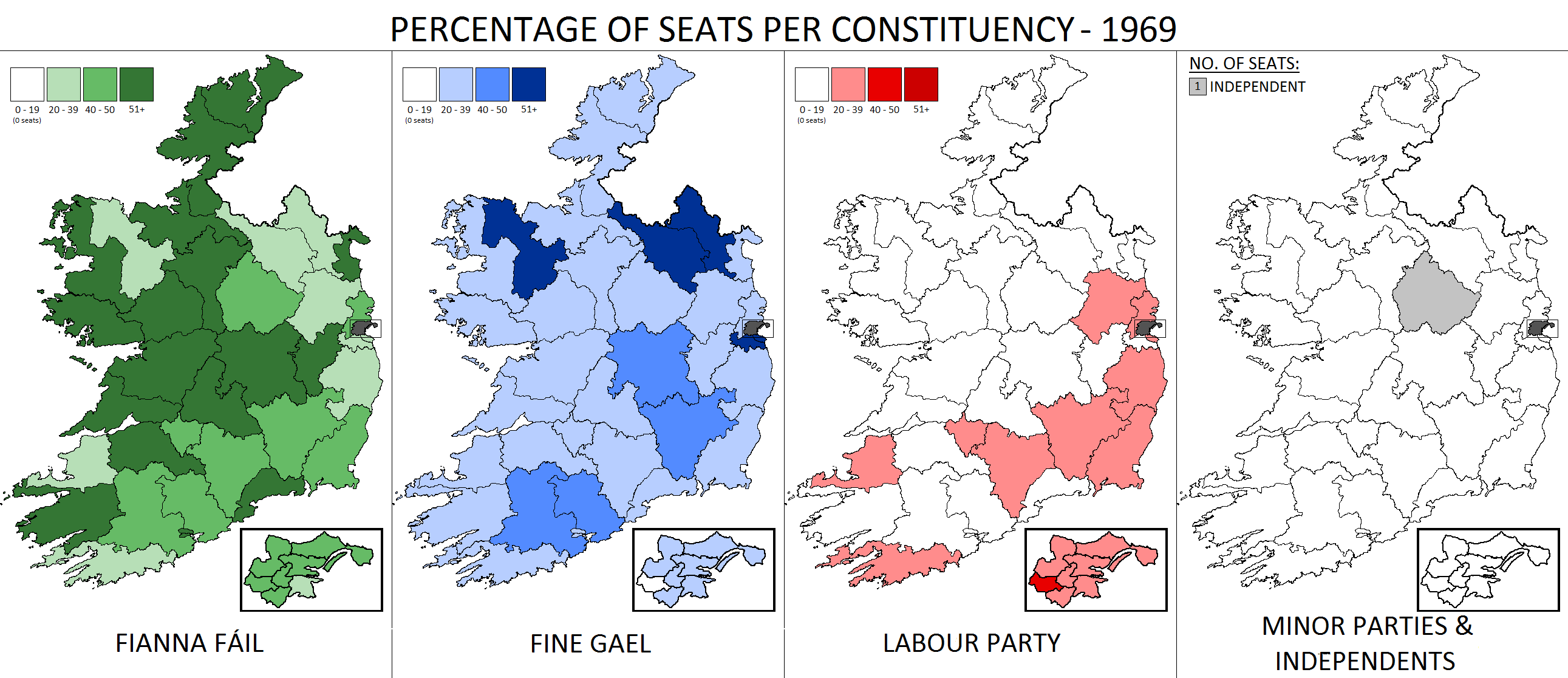
- Percentage of seats gained by each of the three major parties, and number of seats gained by smaller parties and independents.
Taoiseach before election
Jack Lynch
Fianna Fáil
Taoiseach after election
Jack Lynch
Fianna Fáil

The 1969 Irish general election to the 19th Dáil was held on Wednesday, 18 June, following the dissolution of the 18th Dáil on 22 May by President Éamon de Valera on the request of Taoiseach Jack Lynch. The general election took place in 42 Dáil constituencies throughout Ireland for 144 seats in Dáil Éireann, the house of representatives of the Oireachtas, with boundary changes under the Electoral (Amendment) Act 1969. The governing Fianna Fáil won its fourth successive election.

The 19th Dáil met at Leinster House on 21 April to nominate the Taoiseach for appointment by the president and to approve the appointment of a new government of Ireland. Lynch was re-appointed Taoiseach, forming the 13th government of Ireland, a single-party majority Fianna Fáil government.

== Campaign ==
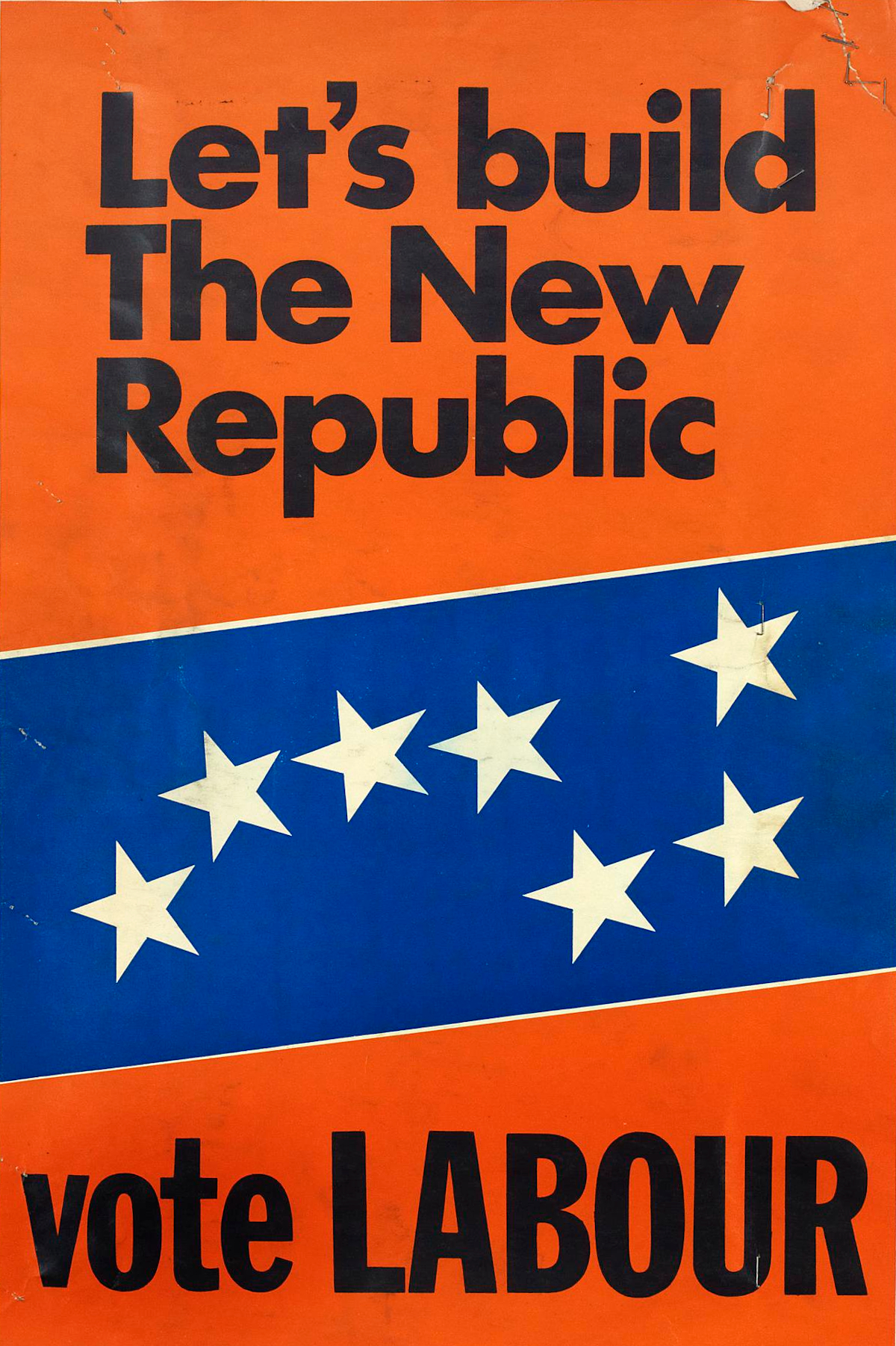
Labour election poster

The general election of 1969 saw two new leaders of the two main parties fight their first general election. Jack Lynch of Fianna Fáil had become Taoiseach in 1966 and was attempting to win his first election. Liam Cosgrave had taken charge of Fine Gael in 1965 and now leading his party into his first election. Brendan Corish was fighting his third general election as leader of the Labour Party.

Fianna Fáil had been in office since 1957, and in spite of media predictions, the party was still very popular with the voters. Its leader Jack Lynch proved to be the party's biggest electoral asset. His quiet, easy-going and reassuring style, coupled with the catchy slogan "Let's back Jack!", attracted many new voters to Fianna Fáil. The party had introduced many innovative pieces of legislation during the 1960s and was now looking for a fresh mandate. Fianna Fáil were also helped by a deeply divided opposition.

Fine Gael had internal divisions. There was tension between the older conservative members, who wanted to keep the party as it was, and the younger deputies who wanted to move the party to the left. One of the party's policies proposed to abolish compulsory Irish for State examinations and civil service jobs.

The Labour Party on the other hand were predicted to make gains after firmly ruling out a pre-election pact with Fine Gael. The party fielded a number of new, high-profile candidates, including Justin Keating, Conor Cruise O'Brien, David Thornley and Noël Browne. The slogan "The Seventies will be Socialist" was popular with Labour supporters; however, Fianna Fáil played the "red card", linking the Labour Party with communism. The tactic worked successfully.

== Result ==
Election to the 19th Dáil – 18 June 1969
Party	Leader	Seats	±	% of seats	First pref. votes	% FPv	±%
Fianna Fáil	Jack Lynch	75	+3	52.1	602,234	45.7	–2.0
Fine Gael	Liam Cosgrave	50	+3	34.7	449,749	34.1	0
Labour	Brendan Corish	18	–4	12.5	224,498	17.0	+1.6
Irish Workers' Party	Michael O'Riordan	0	0	0	242	0.0	0
Independent	N/A	1	–1	0.7	42,230	3.2	+1.1
Spoilt votes					16,010	—N/a	—N/a
Total		144	0	100	1,334,963	100	—N/a
Electorate/Turnout					1,735,388	76.9%	—N/a

Notes

- Independents include Gluaiseacht Chearta Sibhialta na Gaeltachta (1,522 votes).

The result marked a third successive victory for Fianna Fáil, led by Jack Lynch. Fianna Fáil and Fine Gael each lost votes, yet gained seats. Labour gained votes, yet lost seats. It was the last election for thirty-three years at which a government was returned to office—until the Fianna Fáil–Progressive Democrats government was returned with an increased majority in the 2002 general election.

=== Voting summary ===
First preference vote
Fianna Fáil	45.66%
Fine Gael	34.10%
Labour	17.02%
Irish Workers' Party	0.02%
Independent	3.20%

=== Seats summary ===
Dáil seats
Fianna Fáil	52.08%
Fine Gael	34.72%
Labour	12.50%
Independent	0.69%

== Government formation ==
Fianna Fáil formed the 13th government of Ireland, a majority government, led by Jack Lynch as Taoiseach.

== Changes in membership ==
=== First time TDs ===
A total of 37 TDs were elected for the first time:

- Peter Barry
- Michael Begley
- Seán Brosnan
- John Bruton
- Liam Burke
- Richard Burke
- Hugh Byrne
- Edward Collins
- John Conlan
- Ger Connolly
- Gerard Cott
- Bernard Cowen
- Kieran Crotty
- Conor Cruise O'Brien
- Noel Davern
- Barry Desmond
- Tom Enright
- Martin Finn
- Garret FitzGerald
- Paddy Forde
- Billy Fox
- Michael Herbert
- Thomas Hussey
- Liam Kavanagh
- Justin Keating
- Bill Loughnane
- Gerard Lynch
- Ray MacSharry
- Tom McEllistrim
- Michael J. Noonan
- Michael O'Kennedy
- John O'Sullivan
- Paddy Power
- Michael Smith
- Frank Taylor
- David Thornley
- Jim Tunney

=== Re-elected TDs ===
- Eugene Timmons

=== Retiring TDs ===
- Lionel Booth
- Paddy Clohessy
- John A. Costello
- Edward Cotter
- James Dillon
- Nicholas Egan
- John Fanning
- Denis Larkin
- Seán Lemass
- Seán MacEntee
- Patrick Tierney

=== Defeated TDs ===
- Seán Collins
- Patrick McAuliffe
- Michael O'Higgins

== Seanad election ==
The Dáil election was followed by an election to the 12th Seanad.
