= Noel Coonan =

Irish former politician (born 1951)

Teachta Dála
- In office May 2007 – February 2016
- Constituency: Tipperary North

Senator
- In office 12 September 2002 – 24 May 2007
- Constituency: Cultural and Educational Panel

Personal details
- Born: 6 January 1951 (age 75) Cahir, County Tipperary, Ireland
- Party: Fine Gael
- Spouse: Pauline Kelly (deceased)

Noel Coonan (born 6 January 1951) is an Irish former Fine Gael politician who served as a Teachta Dála (TD) for the Tipperary North constituency from 2007 to 2016. He was a senator for the Cultural and Educational Panel from 2002 to 2007.

He was elected at the 2007 general election to Dáil Éireann as a Fine Gael TD for Tipperary North. He had been a member of the 22nd Seanad Éireann in 2002 as a Senator for the Cultural and Educational Panel.

A former member of North Tipperary County Council and Templemore Town Council, he was an unsuccessful candidate for Dáil Éireann in the Tipperary North constituency at the 2002 general election.

He was the Fine Gael deputy spokesperson on Agriculture, Fisheries and Food, with special responsibility for Common Agricultural Policy reform from October 2010 to March 2011. He had been deputy spokesperson on Communications, Energy and Natural Resources, with special responsibility for Telecommunications from 2007 to 2010. He was president of the Collins 22 Society.

He lost his seat at the 2016 general election, and was an unsuccessful candidate for election to the Seanad in April 2016.

He contested the 2019 local elections in Tipperary, and won a seat in the Thurles-Templemore local election area. In June 2020, he was elected to the Chair of the Thurles-Templemore District Council. He did not contest the 2024 Tipperary County Council election.

Dáil	Election	Deputy (Party)	Deputy (Party)	Deputy (Party)
13th	1948	Patrick Kinane (CnaP)	Mary Ryan (FF)	Daniel Morrissey (FG)
14th	1951	John Fanning (FF)	Mary Ryan (FF)	Daniel Morrissey (FG)
15th	1954	John Fanning (FF)	Mary Ryan (FF)	Daniel Morrissey (FG)
16th	1957	John Fanning (FF)	Mary Ryan (FF)	Patrick Tierney (Lab)
17th	1961	John Fanning (FF)	Thomas Dunne (FG)	Patrick Tierney (Lab)
18th	1965	John Fanning (FF)	Thomas Dunne (FG)	Patrick Tierney (Lab)
19th	1969	Michael O'Kennedy (FF)	Thomas Dunne (FG)	Michael Smith (FF)
20th	1973	Michael O'Kennedy (FF)	Thomas Dunne (FG)	John Ryan (Lab)
21st	1977	Michael O'Kennedy (FF)	Michael Smith (FF)	John Ryan (Lab)
22nd	1981	David Molony (FG)	Michael Smith (FF)	John Ryan (Lab)
23rd	1982 (Feb)	David Molony (FG)	Michael O'Kennedy (FF)	John Ryan (Lab)
24th	1982 (Nov)	David Molony (FG)	Michael O'Kennedy (FF)	John Ryan (Lab)
25th	1987	Michael Lowry (FG)	Michael O'Kennedy (FF)	Michael Smith (FF)
26th	1989	Michael Lowry (FG)	Michael O'Kennedy (FF)	Michael Smith (FF)
27th	1992	Michael Lowry (FG)	John Ryan (Lab)	Michael Smith (FF)
28th	1997	Michael Lowry (Ind.)	Michael O'Kennedy (FF)	Michael Smith (FF)
29th	2002	Michael Lowry (Ind.)	Máire Hoctor (FF)	Michael Smith (FF)
30th	2007	Michael Lowry (Ind.)	Máire Hoctor (FF)	Noel Coonan (FG)
31st	2011	Michael Lowry (Ind.)	Alan Kelly (Lab)	Noel Coonan (FG)
32nd	2016	Constituency abolished. See Tipperary and Offaly		

Dáil	Election	Deputy (Party)	Deputy (Party)	Deputy (Party)
34th	2024	Michael Lowry (Ind.)	Alan Kelly (Lab)	Ryan O'Meara (FF)
