= Tony McKenna =

Irish politician (1939–2025)

Senator
- In office 1 November 1989 – 17 February 1993
- Constituency: Nominated by the Taoiseach
- In office 25 April 1987 – 1 November 1989
- Constituency: Cultural and Educational Panel

Personal details
- Born: Anthony McKenna; 22 August 1939 County Tipperary, Ireland
- Died: 24 December 2025 (aged 86) County Tipperary, Ireland
- Party: Fianna Fáil
- Spouse: Phyllis McKenna
- Children: 3
- Relatives: Ger McKenna (brother)
- Education: University College Dublin

Anthony McKenna (22 August 1939 – 24 December 2025) was an Irish politician who was a Fianna Fáil member of Seanad Éireann. He was elected to the Seanad in 1987 by the Cultural and Educational Panel. He lost his seat at the 1989 election but was nominated by the Taoiseach, Charles Haughey to the 19th Seanad.

A vocational teacher, he graduated from University College Dublin in 1965 with a Bachelor of Commerce degree, and completed a postgraduate diploma in remedial education. He was a member of North Tipperary County Council from the 1970s until 2009, and served as mayor of the council from 2000 to 2001.

He was married to Phyllis, and they had three children. One of his brothers was the greyhound trainer Ger McKenna.

McKenna died on 24 December 2025 at the age of 86.
