= Nenagh Arts Centre =

Municipal building in Nenagh, County Tipperary, Ireland

- Ionad Ealaíon Aonach Urmhumhan
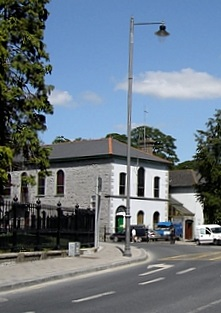
- Nenagh Arts Centre

- Location within Ireland

General information
- Architectural style: Italianate style
- Location: Banba Square, Nenagh, Ireland
- Coordinates: 52.8650°N 8.1994°W
- Completed: 1889

Design and construction
- Architect: Robert Paul Gill

Nenagh Arts Centre (Irish: Ionad Ealaíon Aonach Urmhumhan), formerly known as Nenagh Town Hall (Irish: Halla an Bhaile Aonach Urmhumhan), is a municipal building in Banba Square, Nenagh, County Tipperary, Ireland. The building, which was used as the local town hall, now accommodates an arts centre.

== History ==
In 1884, the town commissioners for Nenagh resolved to erect a town hall and made an application for a loan from the Board of Works. The site they selected, on the east side of Banba Square facing Nenagh Courthouse, had been occupied by the local turf market. The new building was designed by the town surveyor, Robert Paul Gill, (father of Tomás Mac Giolla), in the Italianate style, built by Michael Grace in rubble masonry at a cost of £2,000 and was completed in 1889.

The design involved an asymmetrical main frontage of three bays facing south onto Peter Street (later renamed Kickham Street). The left hand-bay featured a round headed doorway with an archivolt mounted on columns, and a semi-circular plaque, inscribed with the words "Town Hall A.D. 1889", installed in place of a fanlight. The other two bays on the ground floor were fenestrated by round headed windows with hood moulds, while, on the first floor, there was a tall round headed window in the central bay and smaller segmental headed windows with hood mounds in the outer bays. The side elevation of six bays, facing Banba Square, was fenestrated by rows of round headed windows, with the ones on the first floor being larger than those on the ground floor. Internally, the principal rooms were an assembly room and a public library.

The building, which served as the meeting place of the town commissioners, became the offices and meeting place of Nenagh Urban District Council when it was formed in 1900. During the First World War, the town hall was one of a series of venues where a recruiting officer from the Royal Flying Corps, Lieutenant Charles Alston, gave a lecture about life on the Western Front using lantern slides.

The library service relocated to O'Rahilly Street in the early 1980s. The building continued to be used as the offices of the urban district council until 2002, and then as the offices of the successor town council, but ceased to be the local seat of government, when the town council co-located with North Tipperary County Council at a new facility, known as the Civic Offices, on Limerick Road in 2005.

A major programme of refurbishment works, intended to create a new a 194-seat theatre, was subsequently implemented. After completion of the works, which cost €1.6 million and were financed by the Department of Tourism, Culture and Sport, North Tipperary County Council and Nenagh Town Council, the building re-opened as the Nenagh Arts Centre in 2010. Further works to establish a tourist information centre in the building were completed in 2020.
