= Nenagh =

Town in County Tipperary, Ireland

Nenagh An tAonach / Aonach Urmhumhan (Irish)
- Town
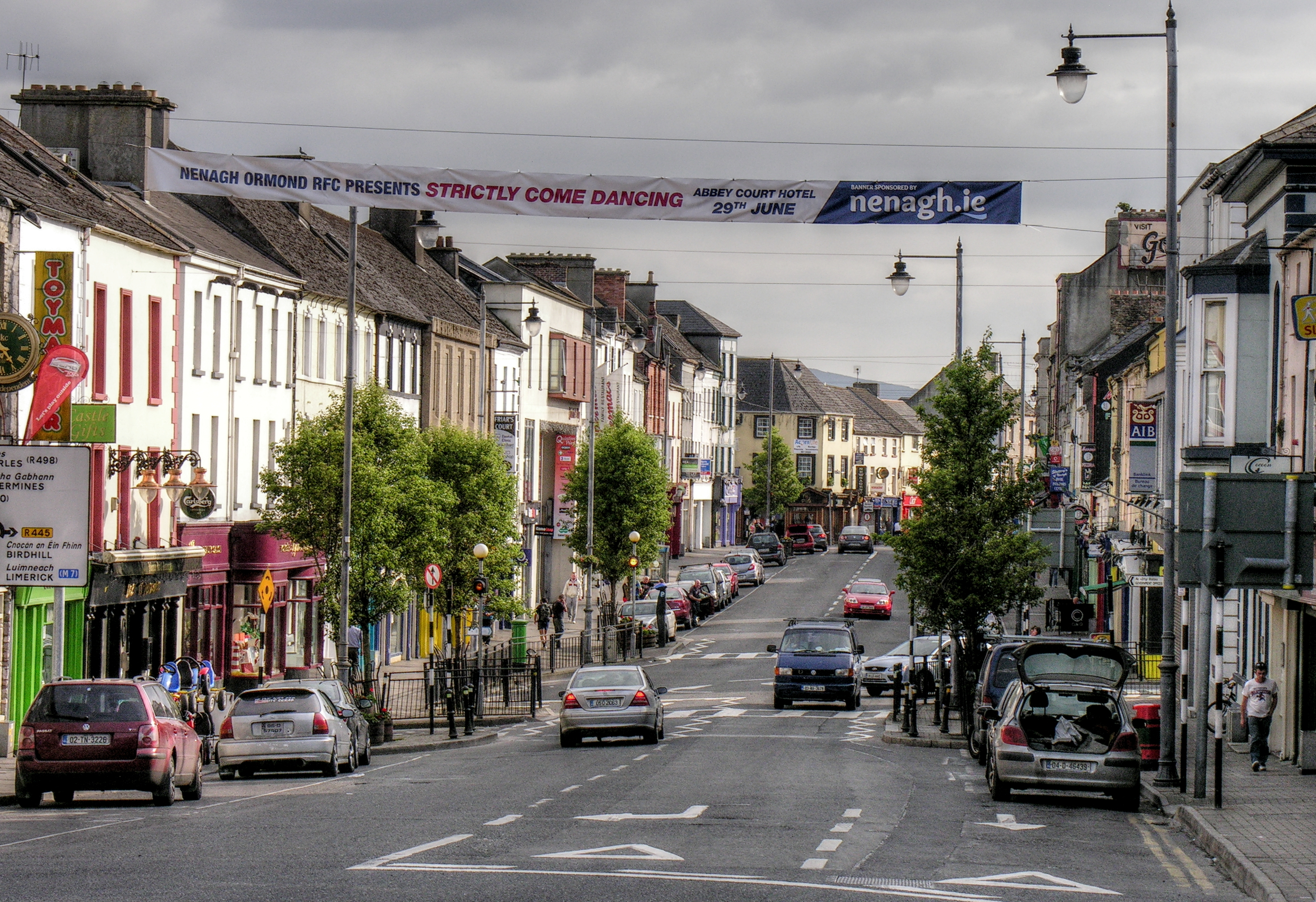
- Nenagh town centre

- Flag

- Location in Ireland
- Coordinates: 52.8632°N 8.1995°W
- Country: Ireland
- Province: Munster
- County: Tipperary
- Municipal District: Nenagh
- Elevation: 72 m (236 ft)

Population (2022)
  - Total: 9,895
- Eircode: E45
- Telephone area code: 067
- Irish Grid Reference: R865787
- Website: www.nenagh.ie

Nenagh (/ˈniːnə/ NEE-nə; Irish: Aonach Urmhumhan, meaning 'the Fair of Ormond', IPA: [ˈeːnˠəx ˈʊɾˠuːnˠ], or simply An tAonach 'the Fair') is the county town of County Tipperary in Ireland. Nenagh used to be a market town, and the site of the East Munster Ormond Fair.

Nenagh was the county town of the former county of North Tipperary. It became the second-largest urban centre in the amalgamated county, with a population of 9,895 in 2022. The town is in a civil parish of the same name.

== Geography ==
Nenagh, the largest town in northern County Tipperary, lies to the west of the Nenagh River, which empties into Lough Derg at Dromineer, 9 km to the north-west, a centre for sailing and other water sports. The Silvermine Mountain range lies to the south of the town, with the highest peak being Keeper Hill (Irish: Sliabh Coimeálta) at 694 m. The Silvermines have been intermittently mined for silver and base metals for over seven hundred years. Traces of 19th century mine workings remain.

Nenagh, Ireland

Climate chart (precipitation, max. and min. temperature)
J	F	M	A	M	J	J	A	S	O	N	D
51 8 3	43 8 3	37 10 4	36 12 5	33 15 7	39 18 10	35 19 12	40 19 12	40 17 10	58 13 7	43 10 5	45 8 4
- █ Average max. and min. temperatures in °C
- █ Precipitation totals in mm
Imperial conversion
J	F	M	A	M	J	J	A	S	O	N	D
2 46 37	1.7 46 37	1.4 50 39	1.4 54 41	1.3 59 45	1.5 64 50	1.4 66 54	1.6 66 54	1.6 63 50	2.3 55 45	1.7 50 41	1.8 46 39
- █ Average max. and min. temperatures in °F
- █ Precipitation totals in inches

The area has a mild climate, with the average daily maximum in July of 19 °C and the average daily minimum in January of 3 °C.

== History ==
Nenagh is in the Barony of Ormond Lower, which was the traditional territory of the O'Kennedys before the Norman invasion of Ireland. This land was included in the grant made by King John of England to Theobald, the eldest son of Hervey Walter of Lancashire, England. Theobald was subsequently appointed "Chief Butler of Ireland".

Historical population
Year	Pop.	±%
1821	6,335	—
1831	8,466	+33.6%
1841	8,618	+1.8%
1851	6,818	−20.9%
1861	6,204	−9.0%
1871	5,696	−8.2%
1881	5,422	−4.8%
1891	4,722	−12.9%
1901	4,704	−0.4%
1911	4,776	+1.5%
1926	4,524	−5.3%
1936	4,902	+8.4%
1946	4,516	−7.9%
1951	4,420	−2.1%
1956	4,568	+3.3%
1961	4,317	−5.5%
1966	4,609	+6.8%
1971	5,174	+12.3%
1981	5,871	+13.5%
1986	5,777	−1.6%
1991	5,825	+0.8%
1996	5,913	+1.5%
2002	6,054	+2.4%
2006	7,751	+28.0%
2011	7,995	+3.1%
2016	8,968	+12.2%
2022	9,895	+10.3%

Nenagh Castle was built c. 1216 and was the main castle of the Butler family before they moved to Gowran, County Kilkenny in the 14th century. The family later purchased Kilkenny Castle, which was to be the main seat of their power for the next 500 years. The town was one of the ancient manors of the Butlers, who received the grant of a fair from Henry VIII of England. They also founded the medieval priory and hospital of St John the Baptist, just outside the town, at Tyone. A small settlement grew up around the castle, but it never seems to have been of any great importance other than as a local market throughout the medieval period. An important Franciscan friary was founded in the town in 1252 in the reign of Henry III of England, which became the head of the Irish custody of West Ireland and was one of the richest religious houses in Ireland. The Abbey was in use for six hundred years; Fr. Patrick Harty, who died in 1817, was its last inhabitant.

In the rebellion of 1641 Nenagh Castle was garrisoned by George Hamilton for James Butler, the twelfth Earl of Ormonde (later the first Duke). It was taken by Phelim O'Neill in 1648 during Owen Roe's journey south via the silver mines but was re-taken by Murrough O'Brien, 1st Earl of Inchiquin in the same year and George Hamilton was back again as governor to face Major-General Henry Ireton and Colonel Daniel Abbott in 1650. After a short siege he surrendered on articles and was allowed to march out — not being hung out of the top window as asserted by many writers following an error apparently first made by a writer in the "Dublin Penny Journal" in 1833. Abbott then became governor for the Cromwellians and withstood attacks on the Castle both by Colonel Grace from Birr and a Captain Loghlen O'Meara of a local family who defeated his forces in an engagement close by and forced them to take shelter in the Castle. After the Restoration, Sir William Flower came along in 1660 on behalf of the Marchioness of Ormond, who had the ownership of the Manor on her marriage settlements. The last Marquess (James Butler) died in 1997. Without a male heir, the marquessate became extinct, while the earldom is dormant.

The town seems to have been refounded in the 16th century. In 1550, the town and friary were burned by O'Carroll. In 1641 the town was captured by Red Owen O'Neill, but shortly afterwards it was recaptured by Lord Inchiquin. It surrendered to Ireton in 1651 during the Cromwellian period and was burned by Patrick Sarsfield in 1688 during the Williamite Wars. Apart from the Castle and Friary, most of the town's buildings date from the mid-18th century onward when its sale out of Butler ownership led to the large-scale grant of leases and the subsequent growth of industries and buildings. The town's growth and development was accelerated in 1838 when the geographical county of Tipperary was divided into two ridings and Nenagh became the administrative capital of the North Riding. In this period Daniel O'Connell held one of his Monster meetings for Repeal of the Act of Union at Grange outside of Nenagh.

In the 19th century, Nenagh was primarily a market town, providing services to the agricultural hinterland. Industries included brewing, corn processing, coach building and iron works with the addition of cottage industries such as tailoring, dressmaking, millinery, shoemaking, carpentry, wood-turning, wheelwrighting, harnessmaking, printing, and monumental sculpting. In the middle of the 19th century, Nenagh was affected by the Famine. The Nenagh Co-operative Creamery was established in 1914 providing employment in milk processing and butter-making. The Castle Brand aluminium manufacturing company was founded in Nenagh in 1934 as the Irish Aluminium Company Ltd. In 2004, it was still the sole manufacturer of aluminium cookware in Ireland.

== Politics and governance ==
The town is part of the nine-member municipal district of Nenagh for elections to Tipperary County Council and is part of the Tipperary North constituency. Nenagh was the county town of the former county of North Tipperary, abolished in 2014.

== Built heritage ==
The town's historic features include Nenagh Castle, the Heritage Centre and the ruined Franciscan abbey.

=== Nenagh Castle ===
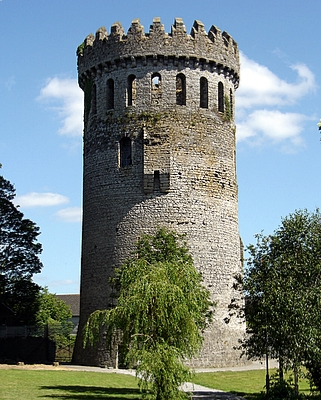
The keep of Nenagh Castle

This Norman keep was built c. 1200 by Theobald Walter, 1st Baron Butler and completed by his son Theobald le Botiller c1220. The circular keep is over thirty metres high, and its base has a diameter of sixteen metres. It is one of the finest of its kind in Ireland. The crown of crenellations and ring of clerestory windows were added at the instigation of Bishop Michael Flannery in 1861. The intention was that the keep would become the Bell tower of a Pugin-designed cathedral that was never built. The keep now features on the logos of a number of local clubs and businesses including Nenagh Town Council. The castle and grounds were extensively renovated between 2009 and 2013. This project was aimed to position the castle as a key tourist attraction in the area. It is now open to the public.

=== Other historic buildings ===
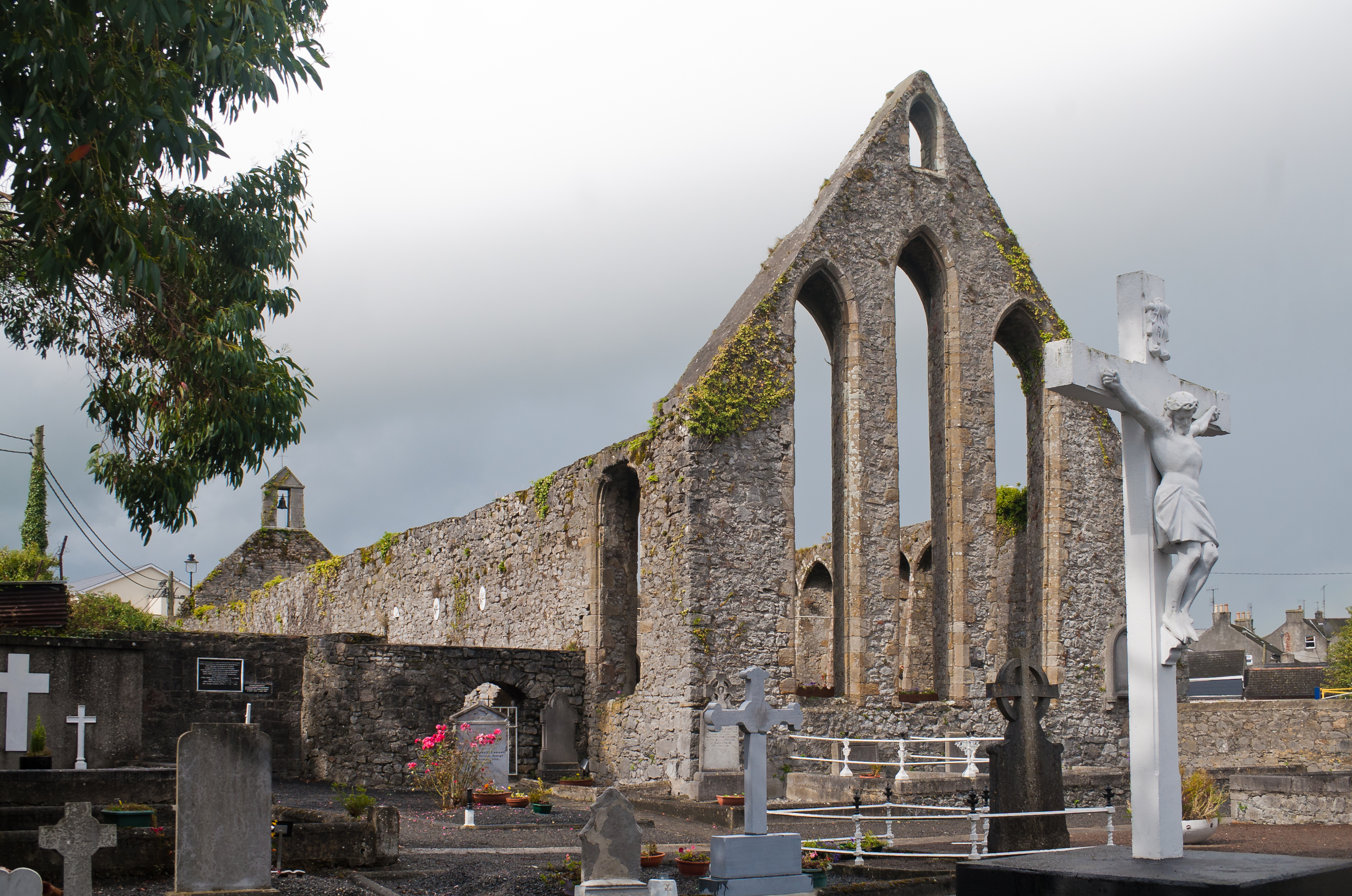
East gable with lancet windows of the Franciscan Friary

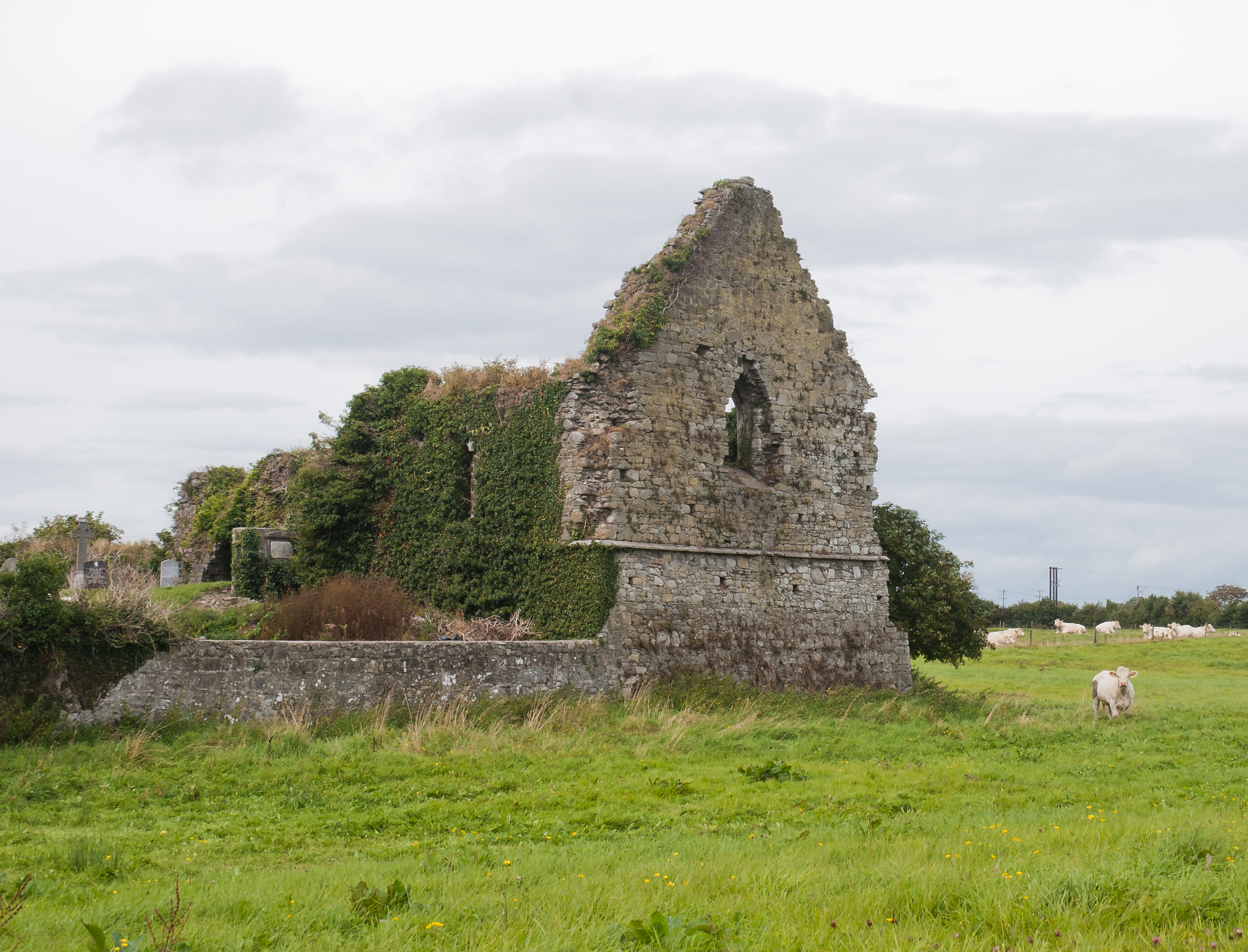
Surviving east gable of the Priory and Hospital of St. John the Baptist at Tyone of the Fratres Cruciferi

Nenagh Courthouse

The old jail, with its octagonal governor's residence, is now a historic monument. Only one jail block remains intact. The Governor's Residence and jail gatehouse house Nenagh & District Heritage Centre.

Nenagh Courthouse was built in 1843 to the design of architect John B. Keane. The design was similar to his previous courthouse in Tullamore, which in turn followed William Morrison's designs for Carlow and Tralee. In 2002, the grounds of the refurbished courthouse became the site of bronze sculptures of Matt McGrath, Bob Tisdall and Johnny Hayes, three Olympic gold medalists with Nenagh links. After the county council moved to their new Civic Offices in 2005, the courthouse was subsequently refurbished.

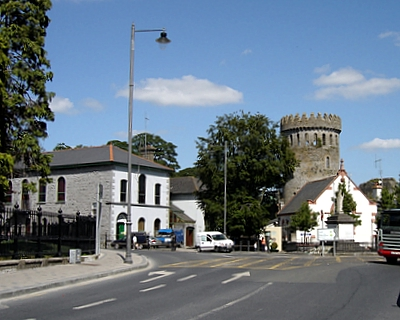
Nenagh Arts Centre (formerly the Town Hall) in Banba Square

Nenagh Arts Centre (formerly the Town Hall) is a distinctive building built in 1895. It was refurbished and now features a theatre and multi-purpose exhibition space. Until 2005, it housed the offices of Nenagh Town Council and, up until the 1980s, Nenagh Public library. The building was designed by the Town Engineer Robert Gill (father of Tomás Mac Giolla).

St Mary's of the Rosary Catholic Church is a neo-gothic church and was built in 1895 to a design by architect Walter G Doolin. It was constructed by John Sisk using Lahorna stone and Portroe slate with the Portland stone of the arches being the only imported material.

The adjacent St Mary's Church of Ireland Church was built in 1862 to a design by the architect Joseph Welland (1798–1860) and features a stained glass window from the studio of Harry Clarke. The building is striking in its simplicity in contrast to its larger and more ornate neighbour.

The town also contains the ruins of a Franciscan Friary, where the Annals of Nenagh were written and the medieval Priory of St John on the outskirts of the town at Tyone.

=== Modern buildings ===
The new Civic Offices on the Limerick Road house Tipperary County Council offices. Designed by ABK Architects, the building won international recognition for its design.

Nenagh Hospital, known locally as St. Joseph's Hospital, located on the Thurles Road (c1940). It is the only general hospital in north Tipperary. Built in the International Style of mostly flat roof and rendered walls, the hospital was retro-fitted with uPVC windows at a later date. There is an adjoining mortuary church with notable mosaics and stained glass.

== Transport ==
Nenagh is situated on the R445 Regional Road, which links it to the M7. The M7 by-passes the town to the south and provides access to the cities of Limerick and Dublin. The N52 National Secondary Route to Birr (and through the Midlands to Dundalk) starts/terminates south of Nenagh, at a junction with the M7. This route also bypasses Nenagh to the north and connects with the M7 to the west of the town, towards Limerick.

=== Bus ===
Nenagh is connected to other main towns and cities by bus services. The main carriers are JJ Kavanagh and Sons, Bus Éireann and Bernard Kavanagh & Sons. Both JJ Kavanagh and Sons and Bus Éireann now offer services 24 hours a day to Dublin and Limerick with JJ Kavanagh buses offering direct services to both Dublin and Shannon airports. The town centre bus stops are located at Banba Square. Nenagh railway station is also served infrequently by a small number of journeys on Bus Éireann route 323. Local Link Tipperary operates bus service 854 between Nenagh and Roscrea with intermediate stops in stops in Toomevara, Moneygall, Cloughjordan and Shinrone. The service operates seven days a week with three departures in each direction.

=== Rail ===
Nenagh railway station is on the Limerick to Ballybrophy line. Passengers can connect at Ballybrophy to trains heading northeast to Dublin or southwest to Cork or Tralee. The station opened on 5 October 1863.

A committee (the Nenagh Rail Steering Committee) working in conjunction with Irish Railway News, had a meeting with the national railway company Iarnród Éireann (IÉ) on 1 September 2005 to present the results of a traffic study funded by Nenagh Town Council and North Tipperary County Council, and to seek a morning and evening service between Nenagh and Limerick which would increase commuter traffic. IÉ agreed to delay an afternoon service from the December 2005 timetable and to work towards an early service when equipment permitted from 2007. A January 2012 national newspaper article suggested that Irish Rail was expected to seek permission from the National Transport Authority to close the line.

Nenagh is only 37 km from Thurles, which is on the main Dublin/Cork line, and which has around 18 trains daily in each direction, including non-stop services to and from Dublin. However, there are only two buses each weekday from Nenagh to Thurles (and vice versa).

== Sport ==
=== Gaelic games ===
Nenagh Éire Óg is the local Gaelic Athletic Association club and has had a number of successes in County Championships in both football and hurling, winning the County Senior Football Championship twice and the County Hurling Championship in 1995. Kevin Coonan Captained Tipperary to the All Ireland Junior Football Title in 1998 . The club has also been represented on Senior All-Ireland winning Tipperary hurling teams by Mick Darcy (1925), Jack Darcy (1925), John McGrath (1958), Mick Burns (1958, 1961, 1962, 1964 & 1965), Michael Cleary (1989 & 1991), Conor O’Donovan (1989 & 1991), John Heffernan (1989), Hugh Maloney (2010), Michael Heffernan (2010), Barry Heffernan (2016 & 2019), Dáire Quinn (2016) and Jake Morris (2019 & 2025).

=== Rugby Union ===
Rugby Union club Nenagh Ormond RFC was the first club in County Tipperary to gain senior status by being promoted to the third division of the Rugby AIB League in 2005. The All-Ireland League club has produced three full Irish International players: Tony Courtney in the 1920s and more recently Trevor Hogan, Cronan Gleeson and Donnacha Ryan.

=== Association football ===
Nenagh is home to Nenagh A.F.C. (1951) and Nenagh Celtic F.C. (1981). Nenagh A.F.C.'s home grounds are Brickfields and Islandbawn. Nenagh Celtic's home ground is the VEC grounds. Nenagh Celtic have won a number of titles in their history.

=== Athletics ===
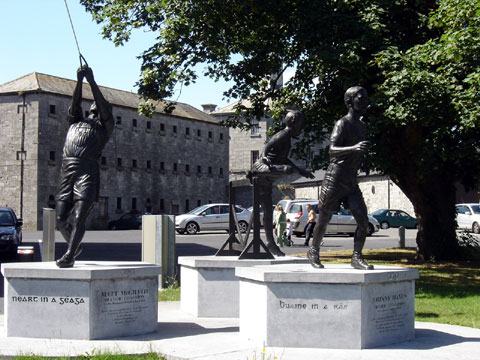
Statue of Olympic gold medalists Hayes, McGrath and Tisdall in Nenagh, Co Tipperary, Ireland

The local athletic club Nenagh Olympic were named after three men (Johnny Hayes, Matt McGrath and Bob Tisdall) with Nenagh connections who won Olympic gold medals and the badge of the club is three interlocking Olympic Rings in green, white and orange. A statue of the three has been erected in Banba Square in the grounds of the Courthouse. The club has produced athletes like Gary Ryan, who represented Ireland at the Olympics. The club also possesses Ireland's first and to date only international standard indoor athletics track at Tyone. Many championships are held there including Munster championships and all Ireland championships.

=== Golf ===
Nenagh Golf Club, located at Beechwood on the "Old Birr Road", was affiliated to the Golfing Union of Ireland in 1929. The original 9-hole course was designed by Alister McKenzie, who, along with Bobby Jones, designed the legendary Augusta National. The course was expanded to 18 holes by Eddie Hackett in 1973. The course was expanded to 150 acres (0.61 km^{2}) during the 1980s and 1990s, and redevelopment to a new design by Patrick Merrigan was completed in 2001.

=== Other sports ===
Nenagh is a hub on the North Tipperary Cycle Network, and several signposted cycling routes leave and loop back to the town. The Nenagh Triathlon Club, formed in 2007, organises an annual North tipp Sprint Triathlon.

The World Taekwondo Association Ireland also has its Irish headquarters in Nenagh. Other sports organisations include the Nenagh And District Darts League, and Nenagh Cricket Club (which is a member of the Munster Cricket Union and plays in the Munster Cricket League).

== Twin towns ==
- Tonnerre in the Yonne département, France

== Notable people ==
- J.D. Bernal (1901–1971) – scientist
- Michael Cleary – hurling player
- Patrick Roger Cleary (1858–1948) – founder of Cleary University in the United States
- Patrick Collison – co-founder of Stripe, Inc.
- E. J. Conway (1894–1968) – biochemist at UCD, FRS and Boyle Medal recipient
- Michael Courtney (1945–2003) – Papal Nuncio to Burundi, assassinated 29 December 2003
- James Cross (1921–2021) – overseas diplomat
- John Dominic Crossan – religious scholar in the fields of biblical archaeology, anthropology and New Testament textual and higher criticism
- Patrick Donohoe (1820–1876) – Irish recipient of the Victoria Cross
- John Doyle – journalist with Canada's The Globe and Mail
- Bernadette Flynn – Irish dancer
- T. P. Gill (1858–1931) – MP of the Irish Parliamentary Party and agriculture pioneer
- Julian Gough – novelist and singer with Toasted Heretic
- Johnny Hayes (1886–1965) – Olympic marathon gold-medalist
- Máire Hoctor – politician
- Trevor Hogan – Irish rugby international
- Jack Jones (1873–1941) – British Labour politician
- Joshua A. Leach (1843–1919) – founder of the Brotherhood of Locomotive Firemen in the United States
- Tomás Mac Giolla (1924–2010) – former Workers' Party president, Dublin West TD and Lord Mayor of Dublin
- Shane MacGowan (1957–2023) — singer/songwriter and musician (lead singer of The Pogues)
- Matt McGrath (1875–1941) – Olympic Hammer-throwing gold-medalist
- Dan Morrissey (1895–1981) – Government Minister
- Nuala Ní Dhomhnaill – Irish poet
- Michael O'Kennedy (1936–2022) – former Government Minister and European Commissioner
- Mary Redmond (1863–1930) – sculptor
- Father Alec Reid (1931–2013) – facilitator of the Northern Ireland peace process
- Donal Ryan – Irish writer
- Donnacha Ryan – Irish rugby international
- Bob Tisdall (1907–2004) – Olympic 400m hurdles gold-medalist
- John Toler, 1st Earl of Norbury (1745–1831) – Irish lawyer, politician and judge, 'The Hanging Judge'

== See also ==
- List of civil parishes in north Tipperary
- The Nenagh Guardian
- Ardcroney
- List of towns and villages in the Republic of Ireland
- Market Houses in the Republic of Ireland
