= 2009 North Tipperary County Council election =

Part of the 2009 Irish local elections

← 2004	5 June 2009	2014 →

21 seats on North Tipperary County Council
	First party	Second party	Third party
Party	Fianna Fáil	Fine Gael	Labour
Seats won	6	4	3
Seat change	-4	-1	+1
	Fourth party	Fifth party
Party	Sinn Féin	Independent
Seats won	1	7
Seat change	+1	+3
- Map showing the area of North Tipperary County Council
Council control after election
TBD

An election to North Tipperary County Council took place on 5 June 2009 as part of that year's Irish local elections. 21 councillors were elected from four local electoral areas (LEAs) for a five-year term of office on the electoral system of proportional representation by means of the single transferable vote (PR-STV).

== Results by party ==
Party	Seats	±	First Pref. votes	FPv%	±%
Fianna Fáil	6	-4			
Fine Gael	4	-1			
Labour	3	+1			
Sinn Féin	1	+1			
Independent	7	+3			
Totals	21	-		100.0	—

== Results by local electoral area ==
=== Nenagh ===
Nenagh - 6 seats
Party	Candidate	FPv%	Count								
Party	Candidate	FPv%	1	2	3	4	5	6	7	8	9
Fianna Fáil	Jim Casey*	13.77	1,478	1,515	1,547						
Independent	Michael O'Meara*	11.95	1,282	1,285	1,316	1,316	1,343	1,601			
Fine Gael	Gerard Darcy*	11.03	1,184	1,193	1,212	1,212	1,275	1,607			
Labour	Virginia O'Dowd	10.47	1,123	1,148	1,264	1,267	1,350	1,374	1,379	1,479	1,502
Independent	Hughie McGrath	9.13	980	1,001	1,142	1,144	1,254	1,270	1,272	1,409	1,418
Sinn Féin	Seamus Morris	8.69	933	955	1,033	1,036	1,083	1,096	1,098	1,230	1,241
Fine Gael	Louis McCormack	7.59	815	827	835	835	863				
Fine Gael	Tom Moylan	7.41	795	801	878	879	955	1,033	1,087	1,174	1,198
Fianna Fáil	Michael Comerford	6.38	685	709	720	722	902	986	996		
Fianna Fáil	Tom Harrington*	5.81	624	662	707	709					
Independent	Tony Sheary	5.74	616	621							
Fianna Fáil	Valerie Foley	2.01	216								
Electorate: 14,628 Valid: 10,731 (73.36%) Spoilt: 111 Quota: 1,534 Turnout: 10,842 (74.12%)

=== Newport ===
Newport - 5 seats
Party	Candidate	FPv%	Count		
Party	Candidate	FPv%	1	2	3
Fine Gael	Phyll Bugler*	14.71	1,370	1,580	
Labour	Jonathan Meaney	13.25	1,234	1,338	1,609
Independent	John McGrath	13.23	1,232	1,307	1,498
Fianna Fáil	Mattie (Coole) Ryan*	12.58	1,172	1,355	1,571
Independent	Martin Kennedy	12.36	1,151	1,215	1,298
Fine Gael	Tom Berkery*	12.06	1,123	1,183	
Fianna Fáil	John Carroll*	11.59	1,079	1,269	1,425
Fianna Fáil	John Sheehy*	8.58	799		
Independent	Noel Monteith	1.64	153		
Electorate: 12,885 Valid: 9,313 (72.28%) Spoilt: 93 Quota: 1,553 Turnout: 9,406 (73.00%)

=== Templemore ===
Templemore - 5 seats
Party	Candidate	FPv%	Count						
Party	Candidate	FPv%	1	2	3	4	5	6	7
Fianna Fáil	Michael Smith*	20.36	1,791						
Fine Gael	Pauline Coonan*	17.44	1,534						
Independent	Eddie Moran	13.96	1,228	1,260	1,313	1,335	1,347	1,470	
Fine Gael	Denis Ryan*	12.62	1,110	1,167	1,180	1,304	1,323	1,395	1,712
Fianna Fáil	John Hogan*	10.88	957	998	1,030	1,099	1,105	1,290	1,338
Fine Gael	Tim Maher	9.05	796	807	833	847	865	933	976
Labour	Thomas Murphy	5.10	449	492	540	595	600	624	
Fianna Fáil	Dr. Joe Hennessy*	4.63	407	474	493	571	578		
Fianna Fáil	Mark McLoughlin	3.59	316	385	389				
Labour	Des Hanna	2.36	208	212					
Electorate: 11,785 Valid: 8,796 (74.64%) Spoilt: 110 Quota: 1,467 Turnout: 8,906 (75.57%)

=== Thurles ===
Thurles - 5 seats
Party	Candidate	FPv%	Count						
Party	Candidate	FPv%	1	2	3	4	5	6	7
Fianna Fáil	Seamus Hanafin*	16.76	1,590						
Independent	Michael Lowry, Jnr*	14.09	1,336	1,396	1,501	1,626			
Independent	Jim Ryan*	13.60	1,290	1,348	1,456	1,735			
Labour	John Kennedy*	10.33	980	1,147	1,267	1,387	1,454	1,466	1,638
Fianna Fáil	Seán Ryan	9.65	915	940	980	1,047	1,088	1,098	1,200
Independent	Willie Kennedy*	9.37	889	894	926	947	963	977	
Independent	Billy Clancy	8.01	760	775	855	950	980	989	1,483
Independent	Noel O'Dwyer	7.06	670	704	807				
Fine Gael	Mae Quinn	6.63	629	666					
Labour	John Kenehan	4.49	426						
Electorate: 13,017 Valid: 9,485 (72.87%) Spoilt: 76 Quota: 1,581 Turnout: 9,561 (73.45%)
