= John Lewis Kingston =

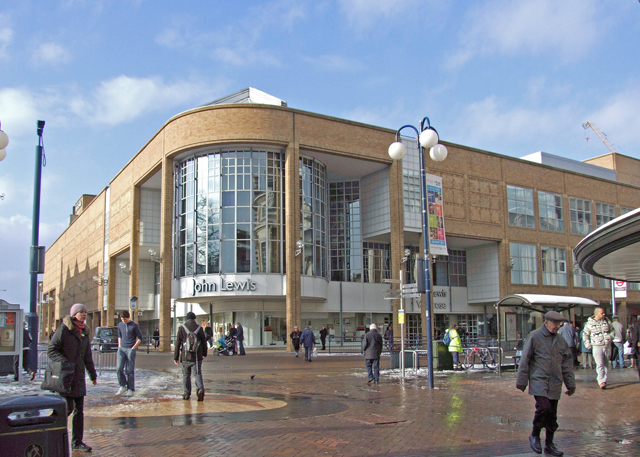
- Clarence Street frontage
- Interactive map of the John Lewis Kingston area

General information
- Status: Open, in use
- Type: Department store
- Location: Kingston upon Thames, London, Wood St, KT1 1TE
- Coordinates: 51.4116°N 0.3069°W
- Current tenants: John Lewis & Partners and Waitrose
- Construction started: 1986
- Opened: September 1990
- Owner: John Lewis Partnership

Design and construction
- Architect: Paul Koralek
- Architecture firm: Ahrends, Burton and Koralek
- Civil engineer: ARUP

Other information
- Parking: 700

Website
- https://www.johnlewis.com/our-shops/kingston

John Lewis Kingston is a John Lewis & Partners department store in Kingston upon Thames, London, England. Opened in September 1990, the store is located adjacent to Kingston Bridge and The Bentall Centre. The building is bisected by the A308 road in tunnel at ground level, part of the Kingston one-way system.

== History ==
In the late 1960s, John Lewis began searching for a site to serve wealthy south west London and Surrey, considering locations such as Croydon, Sutton and Kingston. The site at Horsefair was considered, however due to Kingston's reputation for poor traffic congestion, the scheme was not proceeded with.

Following negotiations with landowners, agreement was reached with the Royal Borough of Kingston upon Thames to build a store on the site in the late 1970s. However, the Greater London Council (GLC) would not fund the proposed Relief Road scheme that would allow for the development of the site. Following the abolition of the GLC in 1986, Kingston Council proceeded with the Relief Road scheme itself, thereby allowing development to commence.

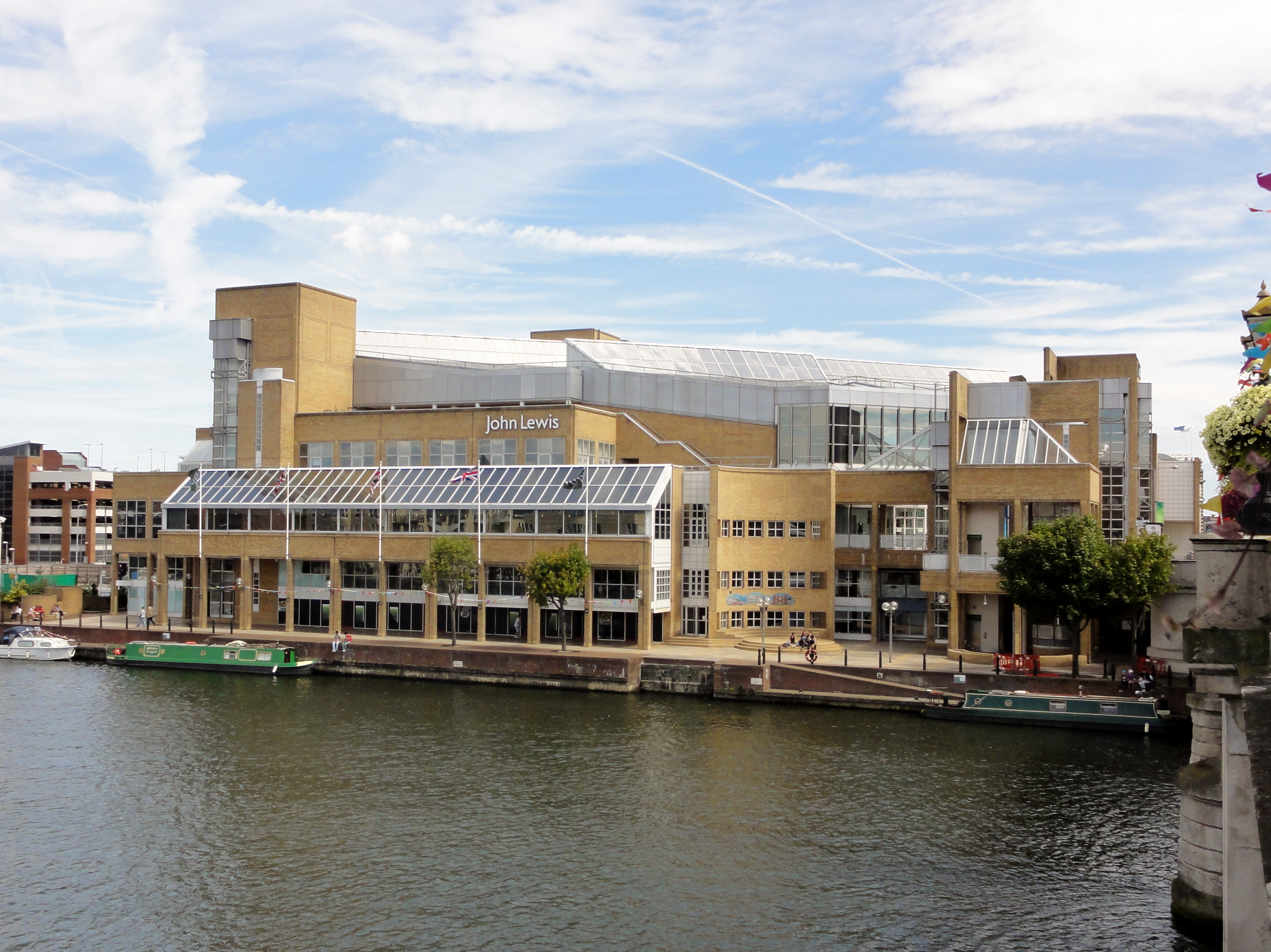
View of the store from Kingston Bridge

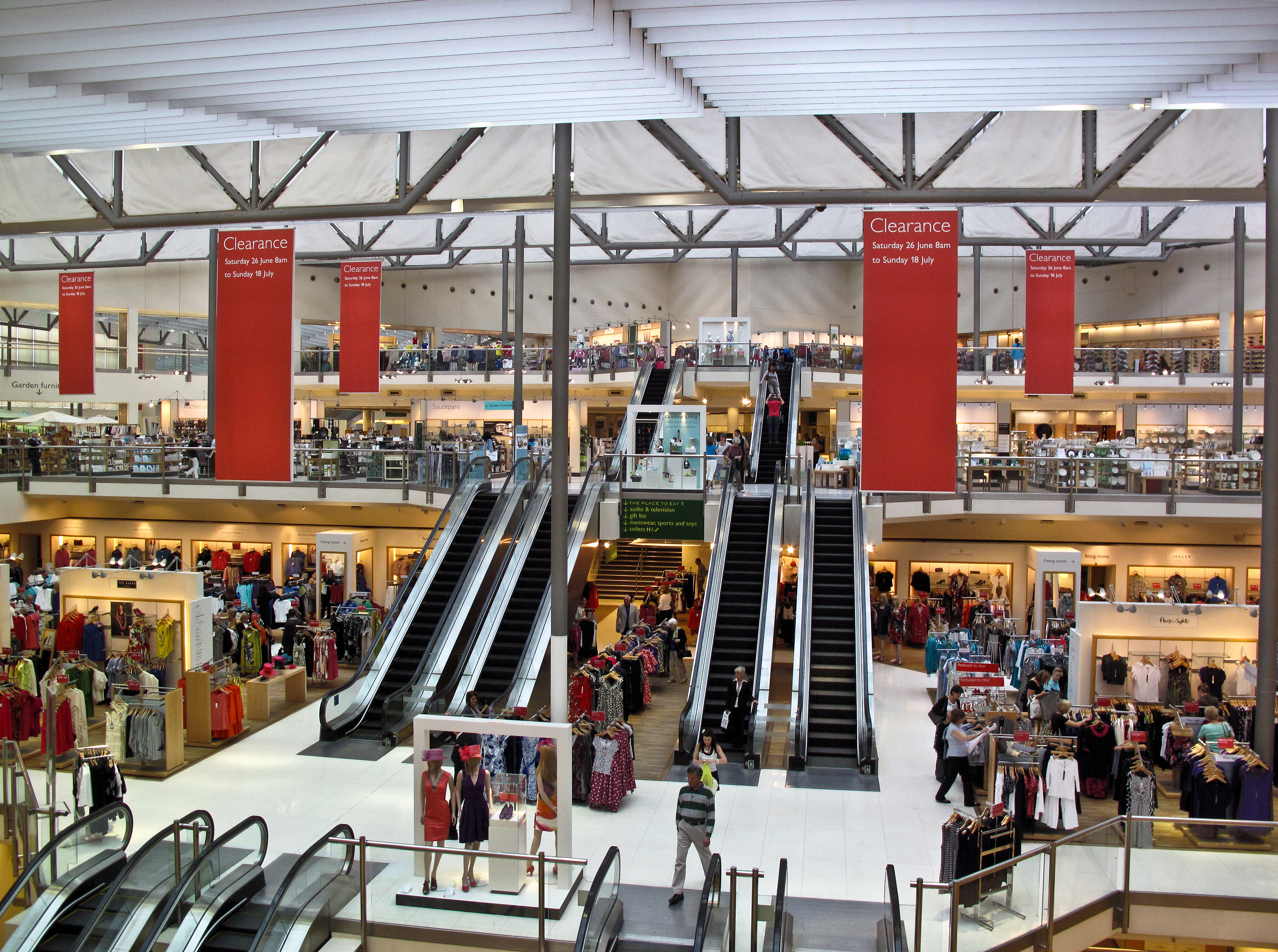
Interior of the store

=== Construction ===
During initial archaeological excavation work in the early 1980s, a 14th-century chalk and flint underground cellar and remains of the 12th century Kingston Bridge were uncovered. Both structures were removed, and reinstated in the John Lewis basement alongside the Riverside Walk - with glass panels allowing viewing of the structures.

Construction began in October 1986. 18m deep diaphragm walls were required to dig the 3 basement levels, directly adjacent to the River Thames. Over 145,000m^{3} of material was excavated. Although the A308 road passes through the building in tunnel, the structure was actually built as a "bridge" through the building to minimise vibration and noise for customers of the store. The tunnel opened as part of the Relief Road scheme in 1989, allowing the main shopping streets in Kingston to be pedestrianised.

The store opened in September 1990, after fit out and other finishing work. The project was commended in the 1991 Civic Trust Awards.

The store was refurbished in 2013, with an expansion of the ground floor over the Waitrose basement level.

=== Proposed redevelopment ===
In 2022, Kingston Council proposed that the site could be redeveloped in the longer term (10 to 20 years) for residential, commercial and business uses. In response to the Council's proposal, John Lewis noted that the proposal was "purely speculative" and that "we do not have any plans to close or redevelop the branch".

== Design and artwork ==
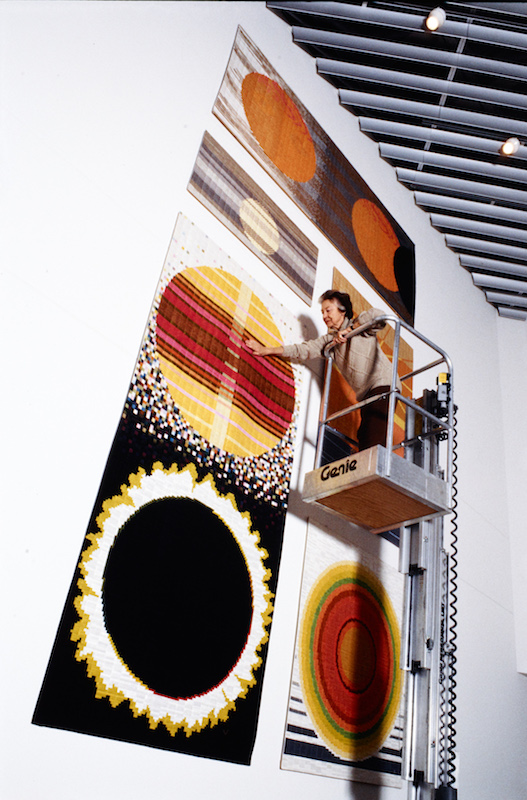
Aspects of the Sun, 1990 by Lucienne Day

Designed by Paul Koralek of architects Ahrends, Burton and Koralek, the store comprises stepped terraces linked by escalators, with a large glazed roof allowing daylight throughout the store. In the basement of the store is a Waitrose supermarket, as well as 700 parking spaces. The outside of the building is faced with yellow brick with intricate details and patterns.

Koralek stated that the design of the store was inspired by the 19th century Parisian department stores of Le Bon Marché or Printemps - with the desire to create "a Peter Jones of the 1990s".

Textile designer and John Lewis Partnership design consultant Lucienne Day was commissioned to create two large silk mosaic artworks for the store - Aspects of the Sun, and Islands. Originally located in the café, the artworks were re-hung in elsewhere in the building in September 2016.

To celebrate the 20th anniversary of the store in September 2010, a mosaic mural of local historic buildings was installed on the outside of the building along the Riverside Walk. This was designed by Yasha Shrimpton, Howard Grange and members of staff - in collaboration with the Save The World Club.
