= Matt McGrath =

American athlete

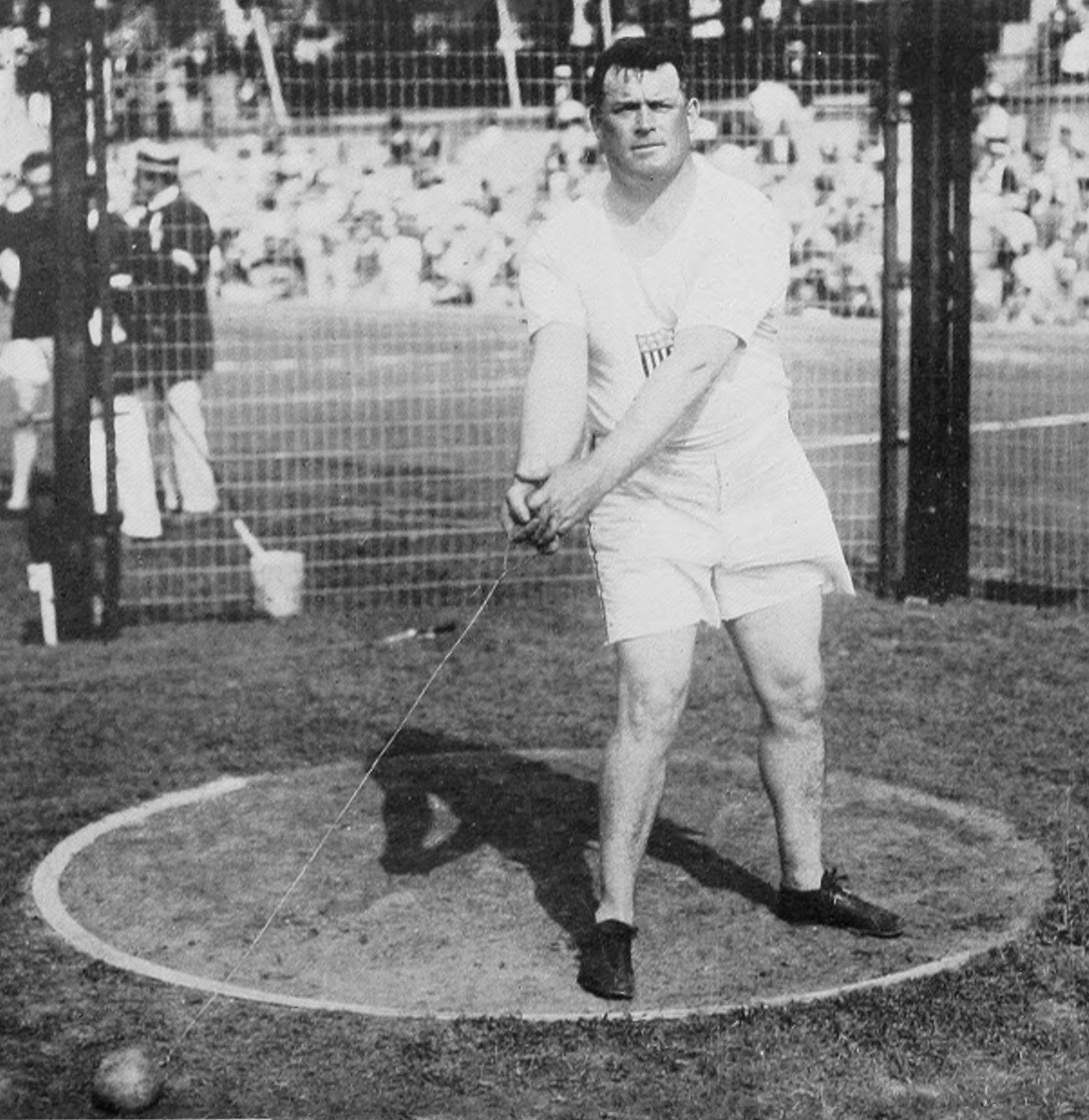
- McGrath at the 1912 Olympics

Personal information
- Full name: Matthew John McGrath
- Born: 28 December 1875 Curraghmore, Boher, Ballina, County Tipperary, Ireland
- Died: 29 January 1941 (aged 65) New York City, United States
- Height: 1.82 m (6 ft 0 in)
- Weight: 115 kg (254 lb)

Sport
- Sport: Hammer throw, tug-of-war
- Club: NYAC, New York; I-AAC, Queens
Medal record
Men's athletics
Representing the United States
Olympic Games
Gold medal – first place	1912 Stockholm	Hammer throw
Silver medal – second place	1908 London	Hammer throw
Silver medal – second place	1924 Paris	Hammer throw
Tailteann Games
Gold medal – first place	1924 Dublin	Hammer throw

Matthew John McGrath (December 28, 1875 – January 29, 1941) was a member of the Irish American Athletic Club, the New York Athletic Club, and the New York City Police Department. At the time of his death at age 64, he attained the rank of Police Inspector, and during his career received the NYPD's Medal of Valor twice. He competed for the U.S. team in the Olympics in 1908, 1912, 1920 and 1924 (at age 47). In his prime, he was known as "one of the world's greatest weight throwers."

== Life ==
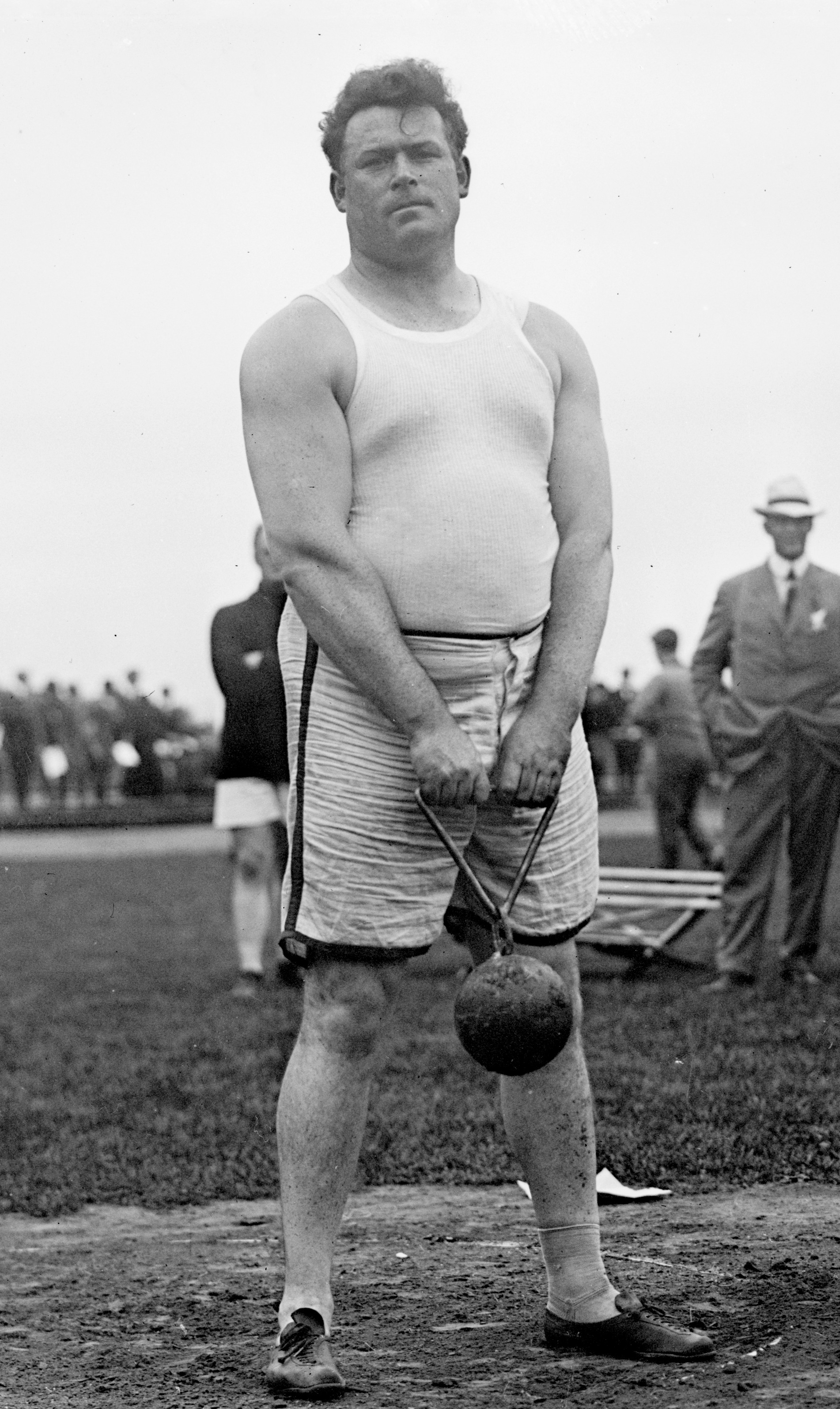
Matt McGrath holding a 56lb weight (1911)

McGrath was born on 28 December 1875 in Curraghmore, near Nenagh, County Tipperary, Ireland, to Tim McGrath, a farmer, and Anne McGrath. He later immigrated to the United States. During his competitive years he stood 5 ft 11 1/2 in (1.816 m) tall and weighed 247 pounds (112 kg), and was part of a group of large and dominant throwers referred to as the Irish Whales.

He did not achieve success in the hammer throw until age 27, when he ranked seventh on the world list of best marks. He remained in the world's top ten up to the age of 50, making his career one of the longest and most consistent in the history of the sport. He won seven AAU hammer throw championships, won seven more in the little-contested 56-pound weight throw, and set two hammer throw world records. His lifetime best throw was the second of those records, 187 ft 4 in (57.10 m), made at New York City's Celtic Park on October 29, 1911.

McGrath made his Olympic debut in 1908. He entered the Olympics as the (unofficial) world record holder and took second behind John Flanagan's third consecutive victory. In 1912 McGrath won the Olympic title in dominating fashion (the shortest of his six throws was over 15 feet (4.6 m) longer than any other competitor's best throw) and set an Olympic record that stood for 24 years.

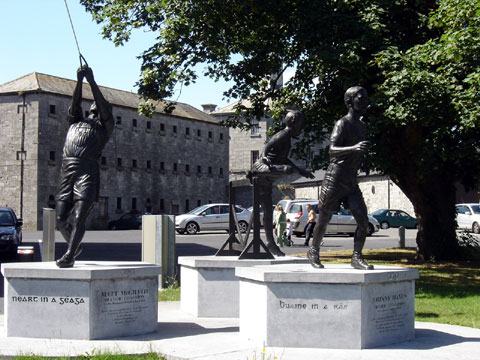
Statue of McGrath and two other Olympic gold medalists (Bob Tisdall and Johnny Hayes) in Nenagh, Co Tipperary, Ireland

At the 1920 Olympics McGrath was a co-favorite along with fellow Irish American Athletic Club member Patrick Ryan, but finished fifth after injuring his knee during the competition. In 1924 he again won the silver medal and is the oldest American track and field medalist ever. An off day at the 1928 Final Olympic try-outs barely kept him off the 1928 Olympic team. There was a public outcry over McGrath's omission from the team and although he went to Amsterdam after a subscription fund had been raised to pay for his transportation, he was, not surprisingly, not allowed to compete.

Held ages 35, 40, 45, 50 and 55 American Records in the Hammer Throw (today referred to as Masters Records). In 2002, three statues honoring Olympic champions with links to Nenagh, Matt McGrath, Johnny Hayes and Bob Tisdall, were unveiled in front of the Nenagh Courthouse.
