= Tullamore Courthouse =

Neoclassical courthouse in County Offaly, Ireland

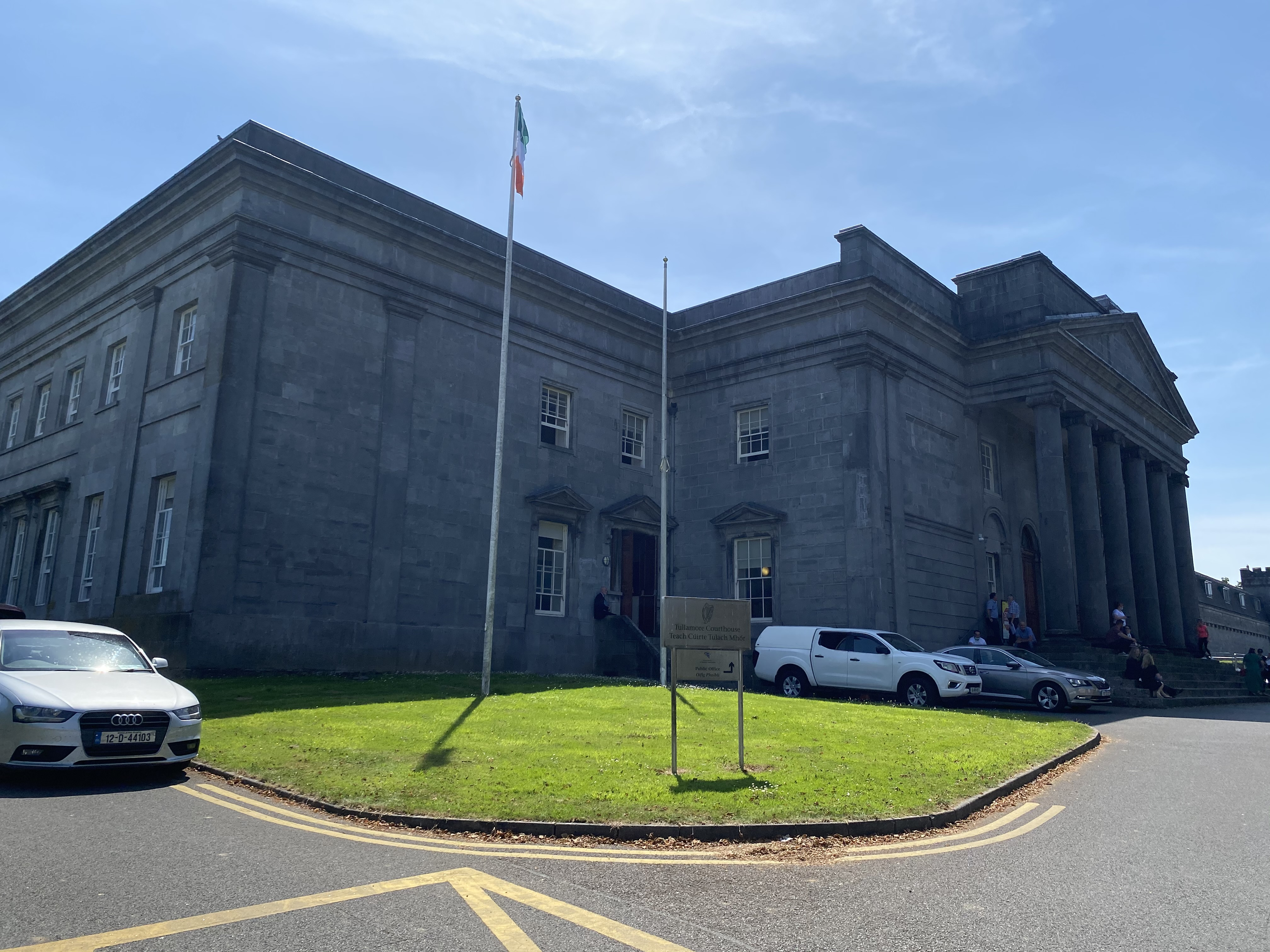
- Tullamore Courthouse

- Location within Ireland

General information
- Architectural style: Neoclassical style
- Location: Tullamore, County Offaly, Ireland
- Coordinates: 53.2703°N 7.4966°W
- Completed: 1833

Design and construction
- Architect: John B. Keane

Tullamore Courthouse is a judicial facility in Tullamore, County Offaly, Ireland

== History ==
The building, which was designed by John B. Keane in the neoclassical style and built in ashlar stone, was completed in 1833. The design involved a symmetrical main frontage facing Cormac Street; there was a flight of steps leading up to a large hexastyle portico with Ionic order columns supporting an entablature and a modillioned pediment.

The building was originally used as a facility for dispensing justice but, following the implementation of the Local Government (Ireland) Act 1898, which established county councils in every county, it also became the meeting place for Offaly County Council. It was badly burnt in 1922 during the Irish Civil War and rebuilt to the designs of Thomas McNamara in 1925. After the county council had moved to Áras an Chontae in 2002, the courthouse was extensively refurbished in 2008.
