= Bob Tisdall =

Irish athlete

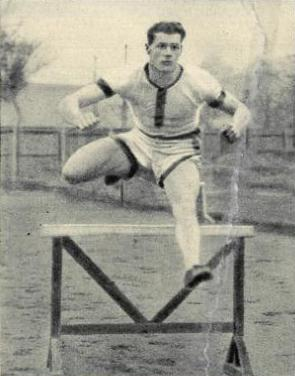

Personal information
- Born: 16 May 1907 Nuwara Eliya, Ceylon
- Died: 27 July 2004 (aged 97) Nambour, Queensland, Australia
- Height: 186 cm (6 ft 1 in)
- Weight: 74 kg (163 lb)

Sport
- Sport: Athletics
- Events: hurdles, decathlon
- Club: University of Cambridge AC; Achilles Club
Medal record
Men's athletics
Representing Ireland
Gold medal – first place	1932 Los Angeles	400 m hurdles

Robert Morton Newburgh Tisdall (16 May 1907 in Nuwara Eliya, Ceylon – 27 July 2004 in Nambour, Queensland, Australia) was an Irish athlete who won a gold medal in the 400-metre hurdles at the 1932 Summer Olympics in Los Angeles.

Tisdall was raised in Nenagh, County Tipperary. He had run only six 400 m hurdles when he won the gold medal at the 1932 Olympic Games in a world record time of 51.7 seconds, which was not recognised under the rules of the time because he had hit a hurdle. Later, because of the notoriety of this incident, the rules were changed and the President of the IOC, Juan Antonio Samaranch, presented Tisdall with a Waterford crystal rose bowl with the image of him knocking over the last hurdle etched into the glass. Though the IAAF did not recognise the record at the time, they now recognise the mark, giving Tisdall credit for setting the milestone of being the first man under 52 seconds.

== Early career ==
Born in Sri Lanka to a family of Irish landed gentry, he lived on his father's plantation until the age of 5, when he returned to his family's home in Ireland. Following prep school at Mourne Grange, Tisdall went on to Shrewsbury School, where he won the Public Schools 440 yards (400 m), and at Gonville and Caius College, Cambridge, where he won a record four events – 440 yards (400 m) and 120 yards (110 m) hurdles, long jump and shot put – in the annual match against Oxford. This record was only equalled nearly 60 years later. Tisdall had a chance to compete in five events, but selected Ted Cawston to run for him in the 220 yd (200 m) low hurdles so that Cawston could receive his "blue". Cawston justified his selection by winning the event that Tisdall had won the previous two years.

Tisdall set South African and Canadian records in the 220 yards (200 m) low hurdles in 1929, a year later setting Greek records in the same event. While at Cambridge in March 1932, he decided to try for a place in the Irish Olympic squad and after he ran 54.2 seconds (a record) for the Irish Championship 440 yards (400 m) hurdles in June that year, the authorities agreed to let him run in his new event at the Los Angeles Olympics, where he also came eighth in the decathlon.

== Olympics ==
In 1928, Ireland, as an independent nation, had won its first Olympic gold medal at Amsterdam with Dr Pat O'Callaghan's unexpected victory in the hammer event. At the time he was barely out of the novice class and he had been included in the Irish Team mainly to gain experience of top-class competition. Over the years, he was to develop into one of the world's greatest hammer-throwers and he demonstrated this by winning his second Olympic gold medal at Los Angeles in 1932.

Ireland won two Olympic gold medals on Monday, 1 August 1932. The first was won by Tisdall.

His father won the All-Irish Sprint Championship; his mother played hockey for Ireland and was a formidable golfer. His Olympic victory had the "element of a fairy tale about it", as one commentator put it.

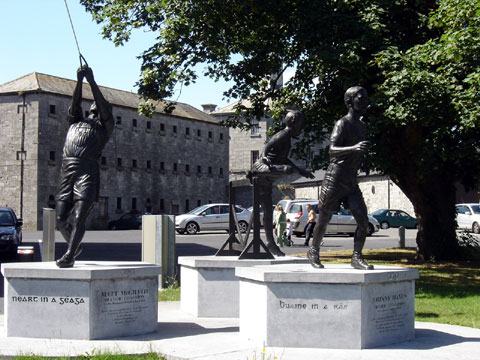
Statue of Tisdall and two other Olympic gold medalists (Matt McGrath and Johnny Hayes) in Nenagh, County Tipperary, Ireland

Tisdall had, in the midst of The Depression, what he describes as "the best job in the world", as an aide to a young Indian Maharaja, escorting him around Europe, showing him the cultural and natural sights. To pursue his Olympic dream, Tisdall had to leave this job and live in a disused railway carriage in an orchard, where he trained by running around the rows of trees. Early in 1932, he wrote to General Eoin O'Duffy, then the President of the Olympic Council of Ireland, and asked to be considered for the Irish Olympic Team in the 400 metres hurdles and he also confessed that he had not previously run in the event.

O'Duffy was convinced that Tisdall could achieve a good time and later invited Tisdall to compete in a special Olympic trial at Croke Park in Dublin. Tisdall failed to make the qualifying time, but O'Duffy gave him another chance and Tisdall qualified for the Irish Team by winning the National 440 yards (400 m) hurdles title at the Irish Championships, also at Croke Park. At the team training camp, Tisdall discovered that there were no hurdles, so he collected driftwood from the beach and set up some crude hurdles on the greyhound racing track. This took him much of the morning, but just when he was ready to hurdle, someone activated the mechanical rabbit, which sped around the track rail, promptly knocking all the makeshift hurdles over. Finding out that there were hurdles available at a local girls' school, Tisdall cycled there and back each day, to use the hurdles, as the students were on vacation.

After winning his preliminary Olympic heat in Los Angeles, Tisdall equaled the Olympic record of 52.8 seconds in the semi-finals. It was only the fifth time he competed at this event.

Then in the final, despite stumbling at the final hurdle, he won the Olympic gold medal in 51.7 seconds which would have been a world record but for the fact that he had knocked over the last hurdle, and under the laws prevailing at the time, this ruled out recognition of a world record. It is worth noting that four Olympic hurdles champions appeared in that one race.

"At that moment I experienced a strange feeling of loneliness—everything was strangely quiet—I began to wonder if the rest of the field had fallen over" – Bob Tisdall, approaching the final hurdle of the 1932 Olympic Games 400 m hurdles final, five meters ahead of the field.

Because of the wide reporting of Tisdall's failure to clear the hurdle causing him to lose the record, people are still confused about the current state of the rules of hurdling, even though the rule was changed shortly thereafter.

In 2002, three statues honouring Olympic champions with links to Nenagh, Matt McGrath, Johnny Hayes and Bob Tisdall, were unveiled in front of the Nenagh Courthouse.

== Later life ==
Later in life, Tisdall lived in South Africa, where he ran a gymnasium during the day, which he converted into a night club after dark. He grew coffee in Tanzania, but moved to Nambour in 1969 with his wife Peggy, where he farmed fruit crops and cattle. He admitted to running his last race at the age of 80, though he ran in the Sydney Olympic torch relay at age 93. At that point he was the oldest living recipient of an individual track and field Olympic medal.

At the age of 96 he fell down a steep set of rock stairs and broke his shoulder, ribs and ruptured his spleen. He never completely recovered and died on 27 July 2004, aged 97.

== See also ==
- Olympic champions in the 400 m hurdles
