= Áras an Chontae, Tullamore =

Municipal building in County Offaly, Ireland

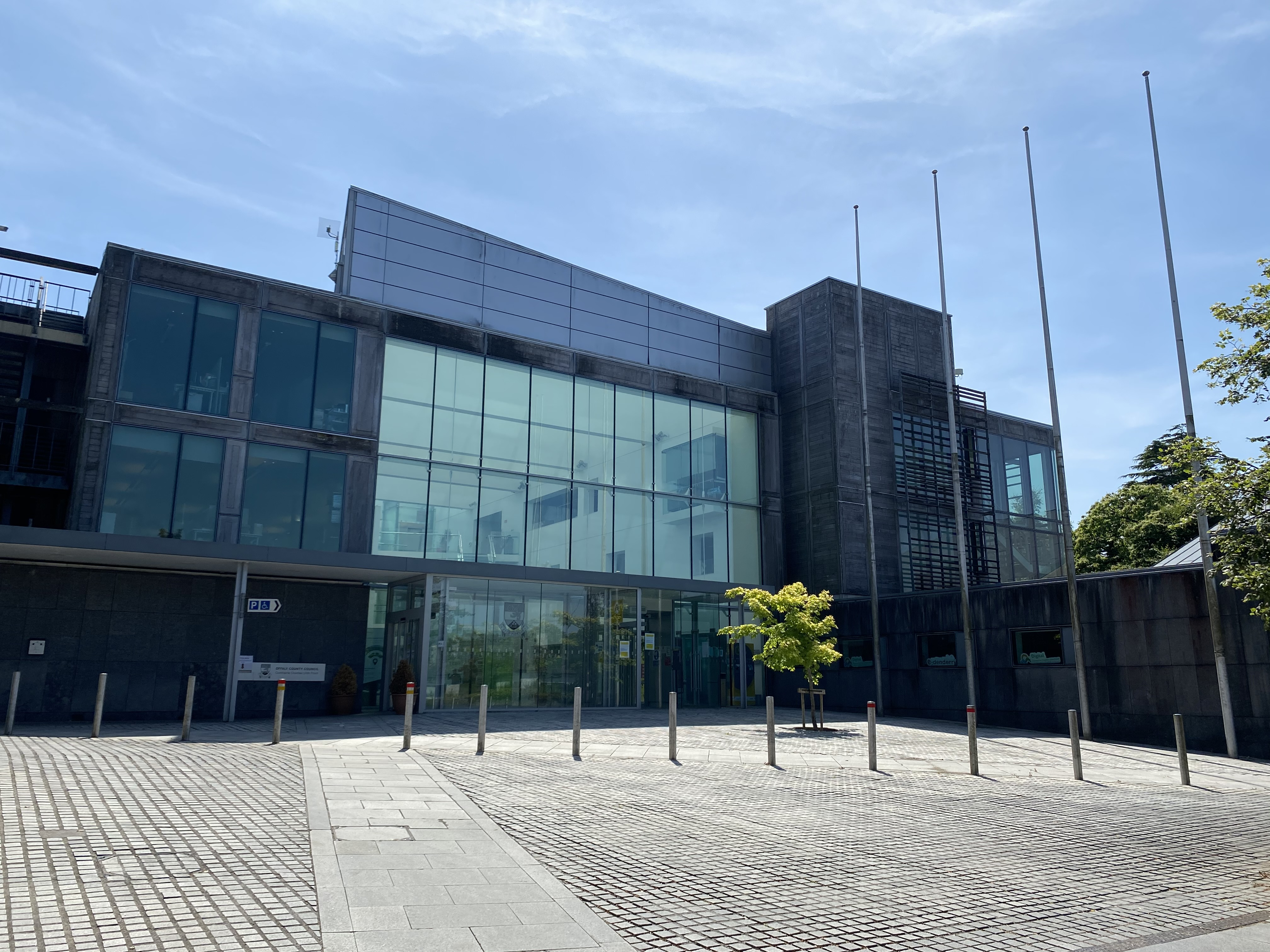
- Áras an Chontae in July 2021

- Location within Ireland

General information
- Architectural style: Modern style
- Location: Tullamore, County Offaly, Ireland
- Coordinates: 53.2689°N 7.4998°W
- Completed: 2002

Design and construction
- Architect: ABK Architects

Áras an Chontae (English: County House) is a municipal facility in Tullamore, County Offaly, Ireland.

== History ==
Originally Tullamore Courthouse had been the meeting place of Offaly County Council. The county council moved to modern facilities, which were designed by ABK Architects, in 2002. The new facility won the award for Best Public Building in the Irish Architecture Awards for 2003. The county council have facilitated a series of exhibitions in the new building.
