= Jack Darcy =

Irish hurler (1898–1972)

Personal information
- Native name: Seán Ó Dorchaí (Irish)
- Born: John Francis Darcy; 23 June 1898 Nenagh, County Tipperary, Ireland
- Died: 28 January 1972 (aged 73) Ballintemple, Cork, Ireland
- Occupation: Engineer

Sport
- Sport: Hurling
- Position: Centre-forward
Club
- Years: Club
- Nenagh Éire Óg
Club titles
- Tipperary titles: 0
Inter-county
- Years: County
- 1922-1926: Tipperary
Inter-county titles
- Munster titles: 3
- All-Irelands: 1

John Francis Darcy (23 June 1898 – 28 January 1972) was an Irish hurler who played as a centre-forward for the Tipperary senior team.

Darcy made his first appearance for the team during the 1922 championship and was a regular member of the starting fifteen until his retirement after the 1926 championship. During that time he won one All-Ireland medal and three Munster medals.

At club level Darcy played with Nenagh Éire Óg.

His brother Mick was also an All-Ireland winner with Tipperary.
