= Mick Darcy =

Irish hurler (1901–1964)

Personal information
- Native name: Mícheál Ó Dorchaí (Irish)
- Born: 6 September 1901 Nenagh, County Tipperary, Ireland
- Died: 4 November 1964 (aged 63) Mount Merrion, Dublin, Ireland
- Occupation: Civil servant

Sport
- Sport: Hurling
- Position: Right corner-back
Club
- Years: Club
- Nenagh Éire Óg
Club titles
- Tipperary titles: 0
Inter-county
- Years: County
- 1925-1927: Tipperary
Inter-county titles
- Munster titles: 1
- All-Irelands: 1

Michael Darcy (6 September 1901 – 4 November 1964) was an Irish hurler who played as a right corner-back for the Tipperary senior team.

Darcy made his first appearance for the team during the 1925 championship and was a regular member of the starting fifteen until his retirement after the 1927 championship. During that time he won a set of All-Ireland and Munster medals.

At club level Darcy played with Nenagh Éire Óg.

His brother Jack was also an All-Ireland winner with Tipperary.
