= 2004 North Tipperary County Council election =

Part of the 2004 Irish local elections

- 11 June 2004

All 21 seats on North Tipperary County Council
	First party	Second party	Third party
Party	Fianna Fáil	Fine Gael	Labour
Seats won	10	5	2
Seat change	-2	-	+1
	Fourth party
Party	Independent
Seats won	4
Seat change	+1
- Map showing the area of North Tipperary County Council
Council control after election
TBD

An election to North Tipperary County Council took place on 11 June 2004 as part of that year's Irish local elections. 21 councillors were elected from four local electoral areas (LEAs) for a five-year term of office on the electoral system of proportional representation by means of the single transferable vote (PR-STV).

== Results by party ==
Party	Seats	±	First Pref. votes	FPv%	±%
Fianna Fáil	10	-2	14,881	41.28	
Fine Gael	5	-	7,749	21.50	
Labour	2	+1	3,722	10.32	
Independent	4	+1	8,657	24.01	
Totals	21	-	36,049	100.00	—

== Results by local electoral area ==
=== Borrisokane ===
Borrisokane - 3 seats
Party	Candidate	FPv%	Count			
Party	Candidate	FPv%	1	2	3	4
Independent	Michael O'Meara	25.78	1,283			
Fianna Fáil	Jim Casey*	23.77	1,183	1,241	1,250	
Fine Gael	Gerard Darcy*	16.17	805	886	894	1,092
Fine Gael	Louis McCormack	15.69	781	840	854	1,008
Fianna Fáil	Tony McKenna*	12.14	604	643	650	
Sinn Féin	Aideen Rosney	3.25	162			
Labour	Rose Tully	3.19	159			
Electorate: 7,104 Valid: 4,977 (70.06%) Spoilt: 61 Quota: 1,245 Turnout: 5,038 (70.92%)

=== Nenagh ===
Nenagh - 7 seats
Party	Candidate	FPv%	Count					
Party	Candidate	FPv%	1	2	3	4	5	6
Fianna Fáil	John Carroll*	10.92	1,414	1,472	1,497	1,579	1,652	
Fine Gael	Tom Berkery*	10.01	1,296	1,365	1,428	1,507	1,621	
Fianna Fáil	Mattie (Coole) Ryan*	9.97	1,291	1,314	1,356	1,442	1,826	
Fianna Fáil	John Sheehy	9.38	1,215	1,228	1,246	1,285	1,447	1,549
Labour	Seán Creamer*	9.24	1,197	1,246	1,481	1,639		
Fianna Fáil	Tom Harrington*	8.99	1,164	1,216	1,274	1,332	1,420	1,452
Independent	Martin Kennedy*	8.48	1,098	1,130	1,140	1,209		
Fine Gael	Phyll Bugler	8.06	1,044	1,084	1,191	1,245	1,413	1,456
Fianna Fáil	Tony Sheary*	7.71	998	1,088	1,186	1,332	1,347	1,377
Sinn Féin	Ella O'Dwyer	6.78	878	928	1,004			
Labour	Virginia O'Dowd	5.53	716	821				
Independent	Joe O'Connor	4.22	546					
Independent	Noel Monteith	0.70	91					
Electorate: 19,702 Valid: 12,948 (65.72%) Spoilt: 234 Quota: 1,619 Turnout: 13,182 (66.91%)

=== Templemore ===
Templemore - 5 seats
Party	Candidate	FPv%	Count						
Party	Candidate	FPv%	1	2	3	4	5	6	7
Fine Gael	Pauline Coonan*	15.52	1,279	1,319	1,358	1,608			
Fianna Fáil	John Hogan*	15.10	1,244	1,295	1,305	1,375			
Fianna Fáil	Michael Smith	14.64	1,206	1,217	1,269	1,291	1,309	1,315	1,649
Fine Gael	Denis Ryan*	14.53	1,197	1,202	1,353	1,451			
Fianna Fáil	Dr. Joe Hennessy*	10.46	862	878	903	947	989	1,000	1,233
Fianna Fáil	Seán Mulrooney*	8.94	737	739	797	799	805	807	
Independent	Seán Fogarty	7.08	583	617	646	702	789	826	890
Fine Gael	Liam Brereton	6.46	532	550	563				
Labour	P.J. Wright	4.39	362	407					
Labour	Liam Leahy	2.89	238						
Electorate: 12,441 Valid: 8,240 (66.23%) Spoilt: 150 Quota: 1,374 Turnout: 8,390 (67.44%)

=== Thurles ===
Thurles - 6 seats
Party	Candidate	FPv%	Count								
Party	Candidate	FPv%	1	2	3	4	5	6	7	8	9
Independent	Michael Lowry, Jnr*	16.91	1,671								
Independent	Jim Ryan	15.27	1,509								
Fianna Fáil	Harry Ryan*	11.76	1,162	1,194	1,214	1,228	1,261	1,336	1,390	1,511	
Fianna Fáil	Seamus Hanafin*	10.21	1,009	1,034	1,044	1,060	1,101	1,164	1,253	1,379	1,406
Independent	Willie Kennedy*	9.52	941	1,021	1,092	1,097	1,291	1,330	1,348	1,472	
Fianna Fáil	John Egan*	8.01	792	804	822	827	905	944	963	1,023	1,041
Labour	John Kennedy	5.42	536	558	566	576	605	661	941	1,116	1,140
Labour	John Kenehan	5.20	514	535	546	561	583	653			
Independent	Billy Clancy	4.77	471	485	506	510					
Fine Gael	Mae Quinn*	4.76	470	492	655	665	690	800	866		
Independent	Noel O'Dwyer	4.69	464	483	498	515	559				
Fine Gael	John Ryan	3.49	345	356							
Electorate: 15,201 Valid: 9,884 (65.02%) Spoilt: 133 Quota: 1,413 Turnout: 10,017 (65.90%)
