= Johnny Hayes =

American athlete (1886–1965)

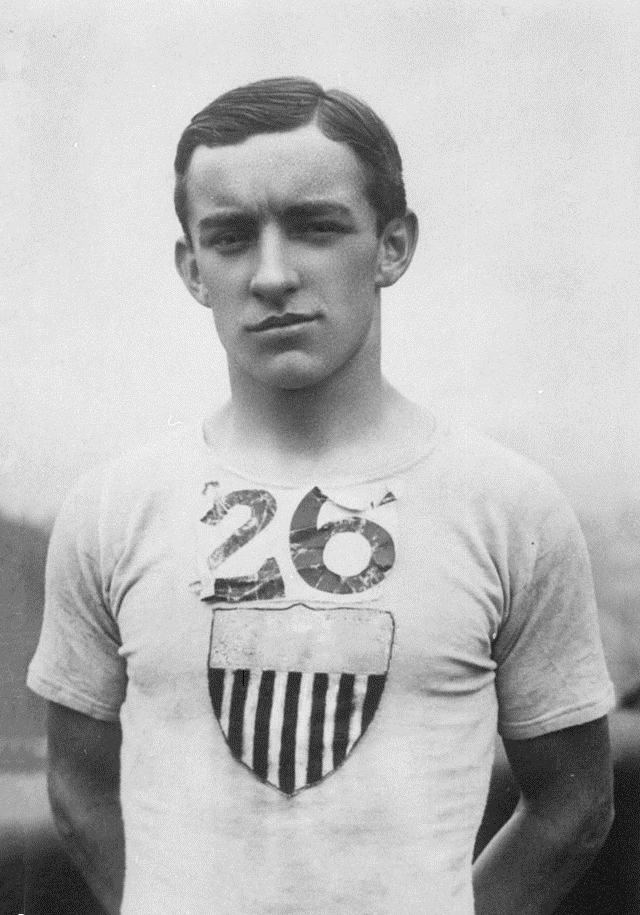
- Johnny Hayes in 1908

Personal information
- Born: John Joseph Hayes; April 10, 1886 New York City, New York, U.S.
- Died: August 25, 1965 (aged 79) Englewood, New Jersey, U.S.
- Height: 1.62 m (5 ft 4 in)
- Weight: 55 kg (121 lb)

Sport
- Sport: Athletics
- Event: Marathon
- Club: I-AAC, Queens

Achievements and titles
- Personal best: Marathon – 2:26:04 (1908) (at 24 mile distance)
Medal record
Representing the United States
Olympic Games
Gold medal – first place	1908 London	Marathon

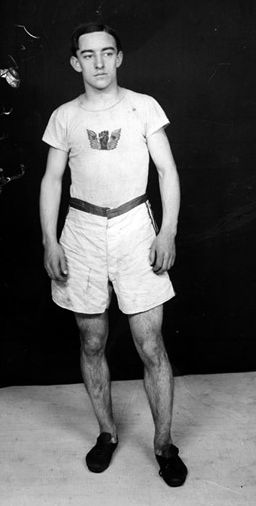
Johnny Hayes, wearing the Winged Fist of the Irish American Athletic Club, posing for a studio portrait shortly after his 1908 Olympic Marathon victory

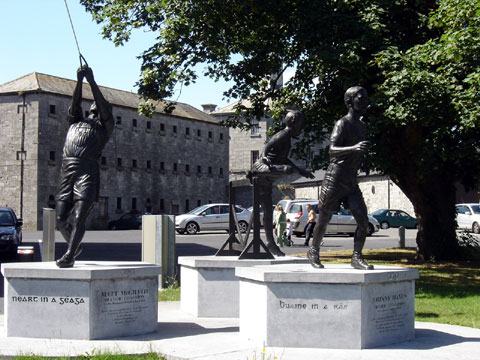
Statue of Hayes and two other Olympic gold medalists (Matt McGrath and Bob Tisdall) in Nenagh, Co Tipperary, Ireland

John Joseph Hayes (April 10, 1886 – August 25, 1965) was an American athlete, a member of the Irish American Athletic Club, and winner of the marathon race at the 1908 Summer Olympics. Hayes' Olympic victory contributed to the early growth of long-distance running and marathoning in the United States. He was also the first man to win a marathon at the now official standard distance of 26 miles 385 yards when Olympic officials lengthened the distance to put the finish line in front of the Royal Box (the 1896 and 1904 Olympic marathons had been less than 25 miles long).

== Biography ==
Born in New York City to a family of Irish emigrants (from Nenagh in County Tipperary), Johnny Hayes is probably best known for winning the controversial marathon race at the London Olympics. Hayes is one of only three male American athletes to win the Olympic Marathon, (the other two being Thomas Hicks in 1904 and Frank Shorter in 1972).

In 1905, he joined Bloomingdale Brothers as an assistant to the manager of the sporting goods department. At night, he trained on a cinder track on the roof of the Bloomingdales building in New York. He was promoted to manager of the department after returning from his Olympic victory.

Hayes started his athletics career with a fifth-place finish at the 1906 Boston Marathon, running for the St. Bartholemew Athletic Club in a time of 2:55:38. He improved on that the following year by finishing third in Boston with a time of 2:30:38 and winning the inaugural Yonkers Marathon. In 1908 he finished second, 21 seconds behind Thomas Morrissey in the Boston Marathon with a time of 2:26:04 and thus qualified for the Olympic Games held in London that same year.

The British Olympic Association wanted to start the race in front of Windsor Castle and finish in front of the royal reviewing stand at the White City Stadium. As a result, the distance was 26 miles and 385 yards (42.195 km). It took until 1921 for the IAAF to codify that distance as the official length of the marathon. Prior to this, races were usually about 25 miles (40 km). He died in 1965.

== 1908 Olympic victory ==
At the race itself, Dorando Pietri from Italy was the first to enter the stadium. But Pietri had depleted himself to open a more than 10 minute lead over the field and was suffering extreme fatigue and dehydration. When he entered the stadium, he took the wrong path, and when umpires redirected him, he fell down for the first time. He got up with their help in front of 75,000 spectators.

Pietri fell four more times, and each time, the umpires helped him up. He managed to finish the race first, with a time of 2h 54min 46s. During all these stumbles and the direct aid from the officials, Hayes had now entered the stadium, finishing the race second, with a time of 2h 55min 18s.

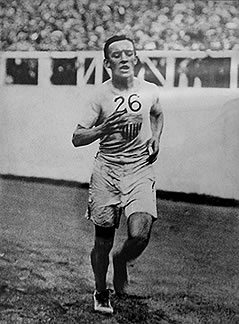
Hayes running in the White Stadium near the finish line

Pietri was disqualified after the US officials filed a protest. Despite the official result, Pietri achieved much more fame than Hayes when Queen Alexandra awarded him a special silver cup.

All of the Olympic officials were British, and the Pietri incident joined a list of other controversial calls in the 1908 Olympics, prompting the International Olympic Committee to start appointing judges from a wide variety of countries instead of only the host country.

After the dramatic Olympic battle between Pietri and Hayes, public interest was such that a match race was organized by professional promoters in November 1908 at Madison Square Garden. Pietri won the race by 75 yards. A second match race was held on March 15, 1909, and again Pietri won. Both Pietri and Hayes turned professional after the Olympics and achieved great fame.

Hayes was a trainer for the US 1912 Olympic team. He later taught physical education and was a food broker. Johnny Hayes died in Englewood, New Jersey.

The Shore Athletic Club of New Jersey (Shore AC) holds the Johnny Hayes collection as lifetime trustees. Included in the collection are numerous trophies, as well as the 1908 Olympic gold medal for the marathon. This represents the first Olympic gold medal to be won at the modern marathon distance of 26 miles, 385 yards.

Johnny Hayes was a guest on the television show I've Got a Secret as one of five former Olympic champions, which aired on October 13, 1954.

In 2002, three statues honoring Olympic champions with links to Nenagh, Matt McGrath, Johnny Hayes and Bob Tisdall, were unveiled in front of the Nenagh Courthouse.

== See also ==
- Dorando Pietri

Records
Preceded by record established	Men's Marathon World Record Holder; July 24, 1908 – January 1, 1909	Succeeded by (United States) Robert Fowler
