= Civic Offices, Nenagh =

Municipal building in County Tipperary, Ireland

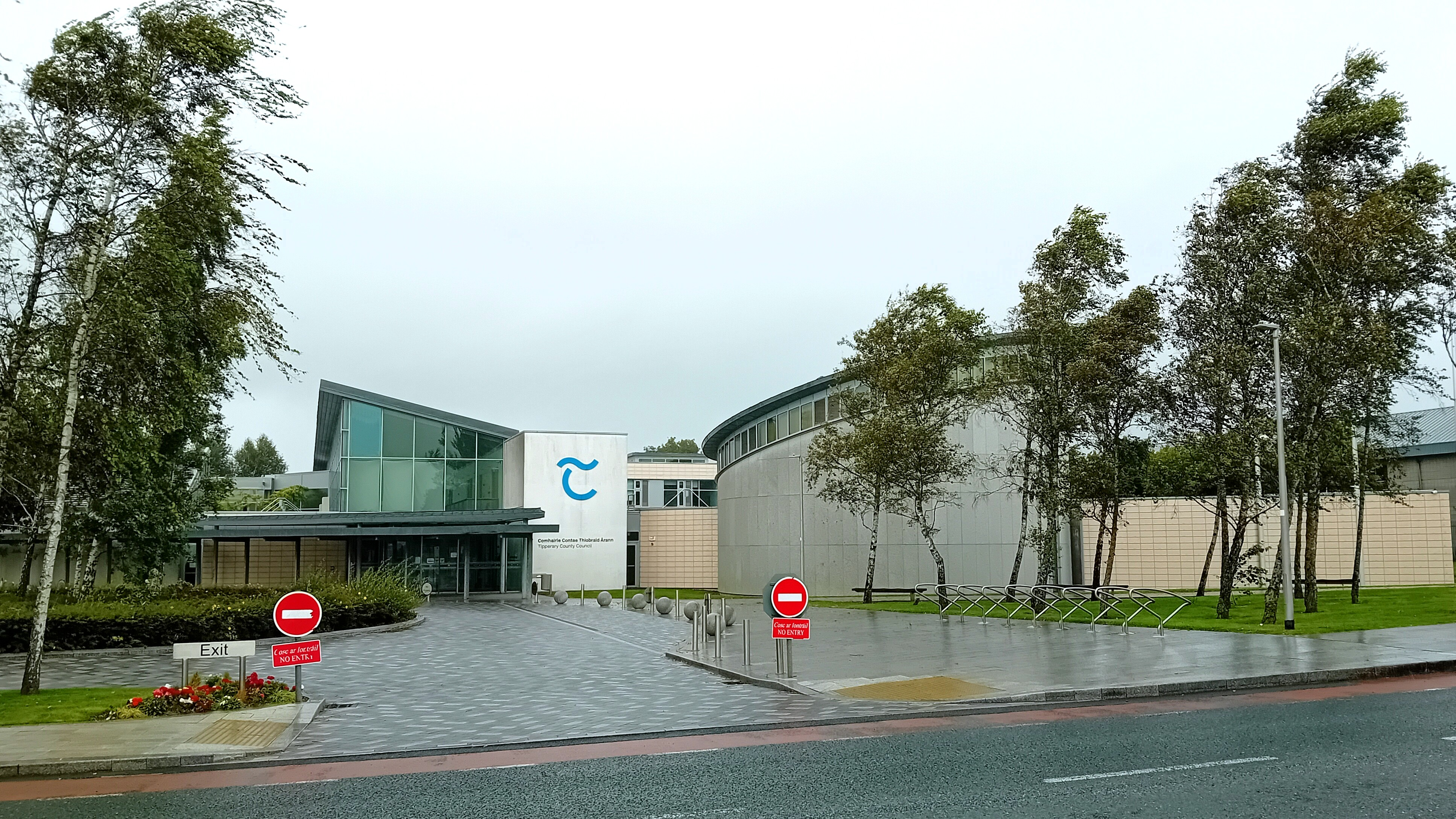
- The Civic Offices in August 2025

- Location within Ireland

General information
- Architectural style: Modern style
- Location: Nenagh, County Tipperary, Ireland
- Coordinates: 52.8628°N 8.2105°W
- Completed: 2005

Design and construction
- Architect: ABK Architects

The Civic Offices is a municipal facility on Limerick Road in Nenagh, County Tipperary, Ireland. The building is of social and economic importance as the headquarters of Tipperary County Council. It is also of some architectural importance having received a design award from the Royal Institute of the Architects of Ireland in 2006.

== History ==
Originally North Tipperary County Council held its meetings in Nenagh Courthouse. The county council moved a new facility, which was designed by ABK Architects, in 2005. The building won a design award from the Royal Institute of the Architects of Ireland in 2006. The building became the headquarters of Tipperary County Council after that body came into operation on 3 June 2014 following the 2014 local elections.
