= John B. Keane (architect) =

Irish architect, 19th century

John Benjamin Keane (d. 7 October 1859) was an Irish architect of the 19th century.

== Life ==
Keane first appears in record in 1819-1820, as an assistant to Richard Morrison. By 1823, he was working independently. He exhibited regularly with Royal Hibernian Academy between 1828 and 1841. Older biographical works state that Keane was trained as an architect at the office of works, Dublin, but this has been questioned. He was a fellow of Royal Institute of Architects in Ireland.

Keane entered designs for the competitions for courthouses in Tralee (1828), Carlow (1828), and successfully for Tullamore (1832). He designed the gothic style buildings in the former Queen's College, Galway. He was engineer on the River Suir navigation from 1846 to 1848. He worked Mabbot Street, from various addresses on the street and later from Lower Mount Street. Towards the end of his life, it appears that Keane suffered from alcoholism, falling into debt and was jailed in Marshalsea gaol. Keane died on 7 October 1859.

== Buildings ==
- Mercy International Centre, Baggot Street, Dublin (c1827)
- Ballybay House, County Monaghan (1830)
- Belleek Manor, Ballina, County Mayo (1831)
- Saint Francis Xavier Church, Dublin (1832)
- Tullamore Courthouse (1835)
- Carlow County Infirmary, Carlow (1838) (demolished)
- The Mausoleum at Oak Park (c 1841)
- Nenagh Courthouse (1843)
- St. John's Church, Waterford (1845)
- Waterford Courthouse (1849)
- Ennis Courthouse (1852), with architect Henry Whitestone
- Barmouth Castle, County Louth
- Carlow Gaol
- Saint Lorcan Ua Tuathal
