= Nenagh Courthouse =

- Nenagh Courthouse

- Location within Ireland

General information
- Architectural style: Neoclassical style
- Location: Nenagh, County Tipperary, Ireland
- Coordinates: 52.8650°N 8.2004°W
- Completed: 1843

Design and construction
- Architect: John B. Keane

Nenagh Courthouse is a judicial facility at Banba Square in Nenagh, County Tipperary, Ireland.

== History ==
The courthouse, which was designed by John B. Keane in the neoclassical style and built in ashlar stone, was completed in 1843. The design involved a symmetrical main frontage with five bays facing Banba Square; there was a flight of steps leading up to a tetrastyle portico with Ionic order columns supporting an entablature and a pediment.

The building was originally used as a facility for dispensing justice but, following the implementation of the Local Government (Ireland) Act 1898, which established county councils in every county, it also became the meeting place for North Tipperary County Council. In 2002, three statues honoring Olympic champions with links to Nenagh, Matt McGrath, Johnny Hayes and Bob Tisdall, were unveiled in front of the courthouse. The county council moved to new Civic Offices in 2005 and the courthouse was subsequently refurbished.
