= Paul Koralek =

British architect (1933–2020)

- Born: 7 April 1933; Vienna, Austria
- Died: 7 February 2020 (aged 86)
- Occupation: architect

Paul George Koralek CBE RA (7 April 1933 – 7 February 2020) was a British architect and founding member of the architecture company Ahrends, Burton and Koralek, best known for designing in the Brutalist style, as seen in buildings such as the Berkeley Library, part of the Library of Trinity College Dublin.

== Life and education ==
Paul George Koralek was born in Vienna, Austria on 7 April 1933. His family left Austria in 1938 after the Anschluss, the reunification of Austria and then-Nazi Germany. From 1951 he studied at the Architectural Association School of Architecture, London, graduating in 1956. After graduation, he worked with Philip Powell. Later, whilst working in New York City with Marcel Breuer, Koralek submitted and won the competition to design the new Berkeley Library in Trinity College Dublin. In the same year, 1961, he founded the architectural company Ahrends, Burton and Koralek with his former classmates, Peter Ahrends and Richard Burton.

== Career ==
Koralek was known for his Brutalist style which is epitomised in the Berkeley Library at Trinity College Dublin. Following this, Trinity also appointed him the principal architect to the adjoining Arts Building in 1969, formally opened in 1978. Koralek was again commissioned by Trinity to design the new Dental Hospital and School on Lincoln Place in the 1990s.

He was appointed CBE in the 1984 Birthday Honours.

National Life Stories conducted an oral history interview (C467/118) with Paul Koralek in 2014 for its Architects Lives' collection held by the British Library.

He died on 7 February 2020 at the age of 86.
