= North Tipperary County Council =

Former local authority for North Tipperary in Ireland (1899–2014)

North Tipperary County Council Comhairle Contae Thiobraid Árann Thuaidh
- County council of North Tipperary

History
- Established: 1 April 1899
- Disbanded: 1 June 2014
- Preceded by: Grand Jury
- Succeeded by: Tipperary County Council
- Seats: 21

Elections
- Last election: 5 June 2009

Meeting place
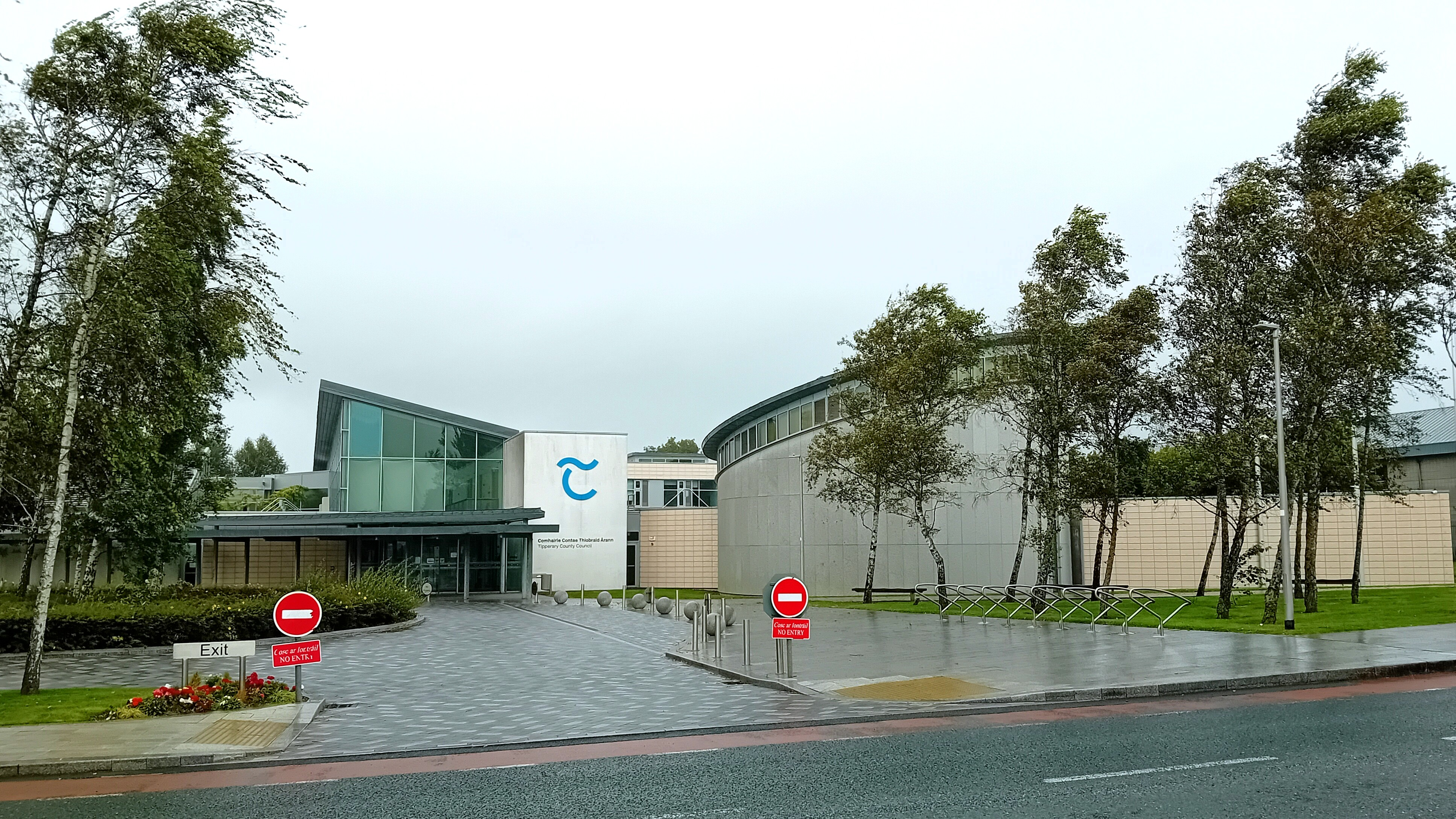
- Civic Offices, Nenagh, Ireland

The area that was governed by the council

North Tipperary County Council (Irish: Comhairle Contae Thiobraid Árann Thuaidh) was the local authority of the county of North Tipperary, Ireland, from 1899 to 2014. The head of the council had the title of Cathaoirleach. The county town was Nenagh.

== Establishment ==
North Tipperary County Council was established on 1 April 1899 under the Local Government (Ireland) Act 1898 for the administrative county of Tipperary, North Riding. It succeeded the judicial county of the North Riding of County Tipperary, except for the district electoral divisions of Cappagh, Curraheen, and Glengar, which became part of South Tipperary.

== Council meetings ==
Originally North Tipperary County Council held its meetings in Nenagh Courthouse. The county council relocated to a new facility, known as the Civic Offices, in 2005.

== Elections ==
The Local Government (Ireland) Act 1919 introduced the electoral system of proportional representation by means of the single transferable vote (PR-STV) for the 1920 Irish local elections. Tipperary North Riding was divided into 5 county electoral areas to elect the 20 members of the council.

Under the Local Government Act 2001, North Tipperary County Council was allocated 21 seats. The 2009 North Tipperary County Council election was the last election to the council.

== Abolition ==
On 26 July 2011, Phil Hogan, the Minister for the Environment, Community and Local Government, announced the proposed merger of North Tipperary County Council and South Tipperary County Council. Following implementation of the Local Government Reform Act 2014, it was dissolved on 1 June 2014, and succeeded by Tipperary County Council.
