= ABK Architects =

British architecture company

ABK Architects (previously Ahrends, Burton and Koralek) is an architectural practice.

== History ==
ABK Architects was founded in 1961 by Peter Ahrends (born 1933 in Berlin, Germany, died 2026), Richard Burton (born 1933 in London, United Kingdom, died 2017), and Paul Koralek (born 1933 in Vienna, Austria, died 2020 in London) after they won first prize in a competition to produce a design for the Berkeley Library at Trinity College Dublin in 1960. ABK was initially established in London in 1961 but has had a base in Dublin since 1996.

External image
- Rejected "carbuncle" scheme by Ahrends, Burton and Koralek

In 1982, ABK produced a prize-winning project for the Hampton Extension to the National Gallery, in London. However, it was described by Charles, Prince of Wales as a "monstrous carbuncle on the face of a much-loved and elegant friend". The design was not used for the eventual Sainsbury Wing extension that was later built in 1991.

Burton left the partnership in 2002 due to illness, and Ahrends and Koralek retired in 2009. The London office of ABK closed in 2012, but its Dublin office continued to operate as a separate company.

National Life Stories conducted an oral history interview (C467/119) with Peter Ahrends in 2014 for its Architects Lives' collection held by the British Library. NLS further conducted an oral history interview (C467/117) with Richard Burton in 2014–15 for its Architects Lives' collection held by the British Library.

== Works ==
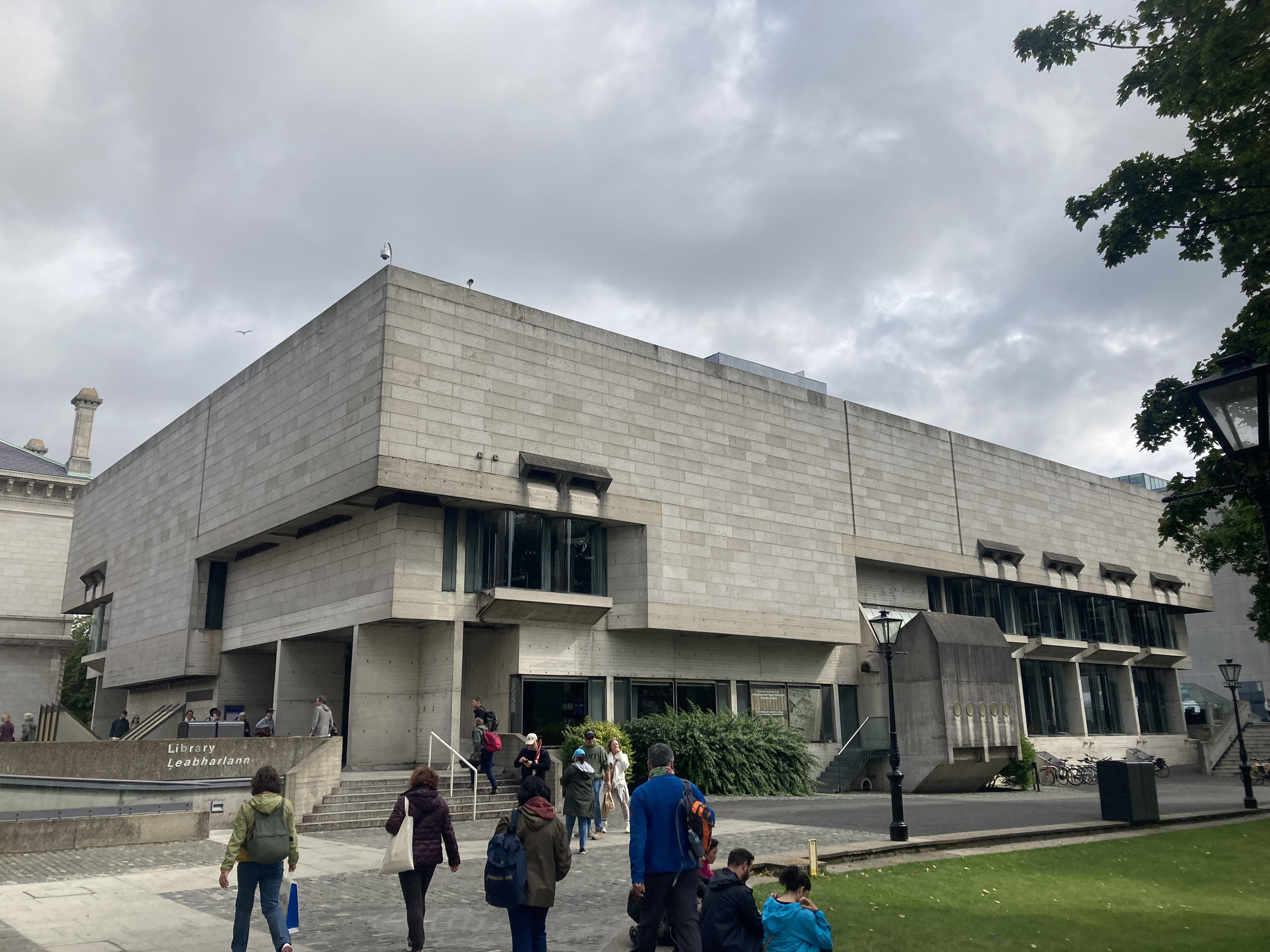
Berkeley Library, Trinity College Dublin

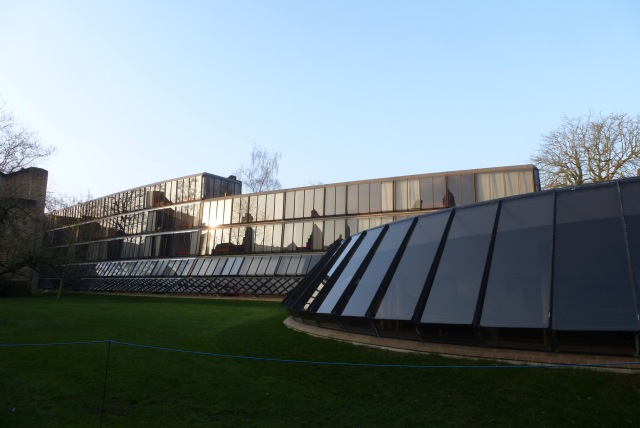
The Hayward Building, Keeble College

Buildings designed by ABK include:

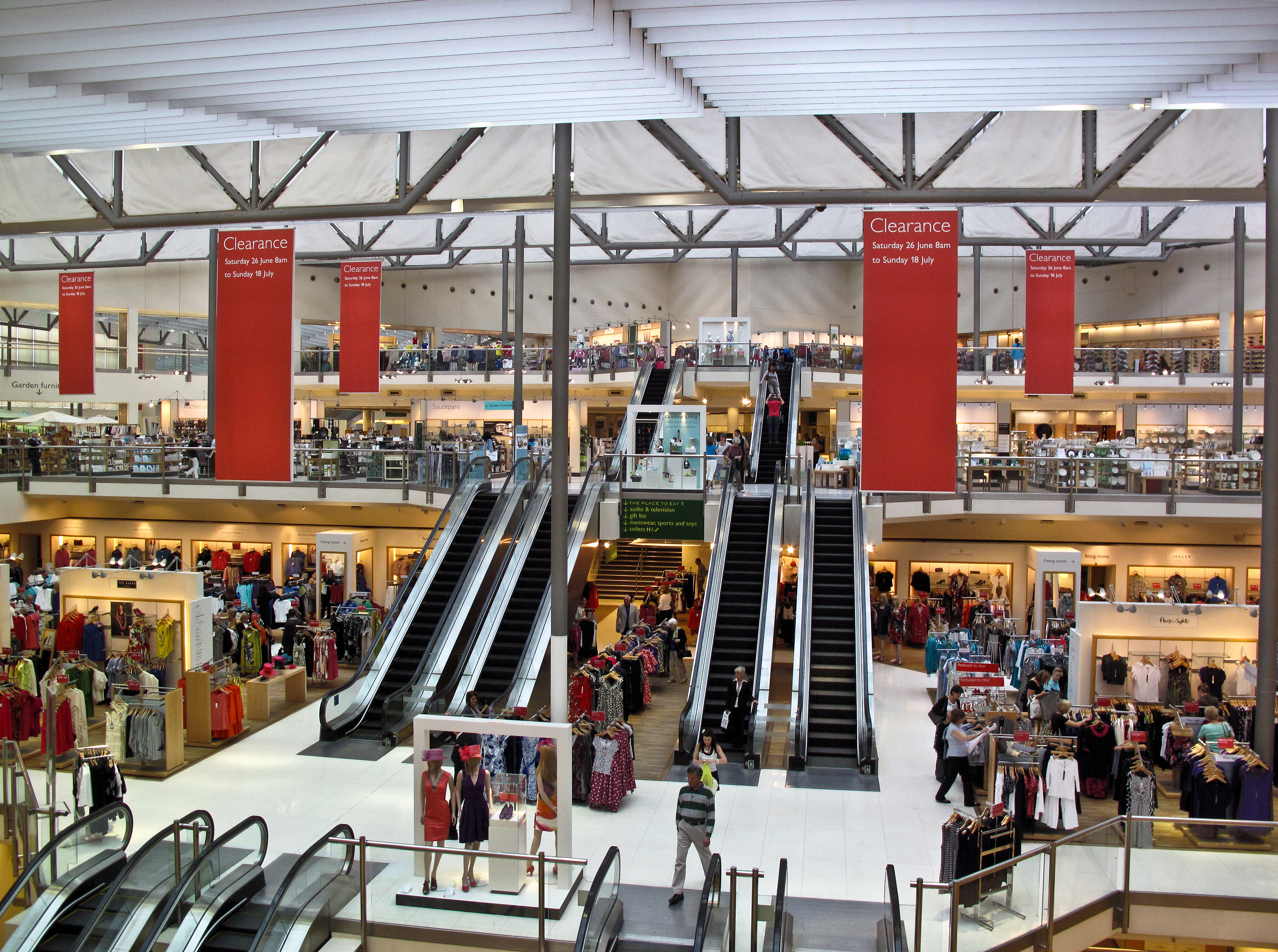
Interior of John Lewis Kingston

- Berkeley Library, Trinity College Dublin (1961–67)
- Gillett House, Chichester Theological College (1966) - Grade II listed building
- Eastfield Primary School, Thurmaston, Leicester (1968) - Grade II listed building
- St Andrew's College, Booterstown, Dublin (1968–72)
- Arts Faculty building, Trinity College, Dublin (1968–79)
- Redcar Library (1971; demolished 2011)
- Additions to Keble College, Oxford on Blackhall Road (1973–77) - Grade II* listed building
- Templeton College, Oxford (1969–96) - Grade II listed building
- Maidenhead Library (1973) - Grade II listed building
- Portsmouth Polytechnic Library (1975–80)
- John Lewis department store, Kingston-upon-Thames, (1979–90)
- Sainsbury's supermarket, Canterbury, Kent (1982–84)
- Hooke Park College, Dorset (1983–90)
- Dover Heritage Centre, Kent (1988–91)
- Whitworth Art Gallery development plan and sculpture court, Manchester (1991–95)
- Docklands Light Railway Beckton Extension and Poplar Bridge, London (1987–93)
- Techniquest Science Discovery Centre, Cardiff (1992–95)
- Selly Oak Colleges Learning Resource Centre, Birmingham (1995–97)
- W. H. Smith headquarters extension, Swindon, Wiltshire (1994–96)
- Waterford Visitor Centre, Ireland (1997–98)
- Dublin Dental Hospital (1995–98)
- Loughborough University Business School and Economics building, Leicestershire (1995–98)
- British Embassy, Moscow, Russia (1993–2000)
- Institute of Technology, Tralee, County Kerry (1996–2001)
- Blanchardstown Institute of Technology, Dublin (1998–2002)
- Áras an Chontae, Tullamore, County Offaly (1999–2002)
- Arts building extension, Trinity College, Dublin (2000–02)
- Áras an Chontae, Roscommon, County Roscommon (2015)

== See also ==
- Prospect 100 best modern Scottish buildings
