= 1991 South Tipperary County Council election =

Part of the 1991 Irish local elections

← 1985	27 June 1991	1999 →

All 26 seats on South Tipperary County Council
	First party	Second party	Third party
Party	Fianna Fáil	Fine Gael	Labour
Seats won	10	9	4
Seat change	▼4	▲1	▲1
	Fourth party	Fifth party
Party	Workers and Unemployed	Independent
Seats won	1	2
Seat change	▲1	▲1
- Area of South Tipperary County Council

An election to all 26 seats on South Tipperary County Council took place on 27 June 1991 as part of the 1991 Irish local elections. South Tipperary was divided into five local electoral areas (LEAs) to elect councillors for a five-year term of office on the electoral system of proportional representation by means of the single transferable vote (PR-STV). This term was extended twice, first to 1998, then to 1999.

== Results by party ==
Party	Seats	±	1st pref	FPv%	±%
Fianna Fáil	10	▼4	13,553	37.83	
Fine Gael	9	▲1	10,281	28.70	
Labour	4	▲1	6,561	18.30	
Workers and Unemployed	1	▲1	1,582	4.42	
Independent	2	▲1	2,304	6.43	
Total	26	Steady	35,823	100.00	—

== Results by local electoral area ==
=== Cahir ===
Cahir - 5 seats
Party	Candidate	FPv%	Count				
Party	Candidate	FPv%	1	2	3	4	5
Fine Gael	Theresa Ahearn TD*	21.03%	1,334				
Fianna Fáil	Sen. Seán Byrne*	15.67%	994	1,029	1,106		
Fianna Fáil	Con Donovan*	13.2%	837	863	892	901	979
Fianna Fáil	Michael Anglim	12.72%	807	840	944	965	1,082
Fianna Fáil	Mattie McGrath*	10.89%	691	714	787	799	851
Labour	Ernest Alton	10.44%	662	686	745	748	
Fine Gael	Sean Sampson*	9.44%	599	689	766	769	1,140
Progressive Democrats	Tom Lonergan	6.61%	419	464			
Electorate: 9,103 Valid: 6,343 (69.68%) Spoilt: 60 Quota: 1,058 Turnout: 6,403 (70.34%)

=== Cashel ===
Cashel - 5 seats
Party	Candidate	FPv%	Count								
Party	Candidate	FPv%	1	2	3	4	5	6	7	8	9
Fine Gael	Jack Crowe*	19.4%	1,298								
Fianna Fáil	Sen. Seán McCarthy*	18.34%	1,226								
Fine Gael	Tom Wood	9.53%	637	663	676	686	731	759	950	1,030	1,088
Fine Gael	Tom Hayes	7.85%	525	586	598	603	655	688	828	880	959
Fianna Fáil	Timmy Hammersley*	7.78%	520	543	569	585	618	729	761	958	1,258
Fine Gael	Maureen O'Donoghue	7.49%	501	509	560	568	588	617	642	720	794
Fianna Fáil	Josephine Quinlan	7.2%	481	502	518	529	542	588	613	688	
Fine Gael	Catherine McLoughlin	5.27%	352	367	371	375	451	466			
Progressive Democrats	John Bergin	4.8%	321	326	329	332					
Fianna Fáil	William McInerney	4.8%	320	326	368	405	444	556	580		
Fianna Fáil	Roger Kennedy	4.65%	311	323	347	364	398				
Sinn Féin	Michael Browne	2.89%	193	199							
Electorate: 9,963 Valid: 6,685 (67.1%) Spoilt: 48 Quota: 1,115 Turnout: 6,733 (67.58%)

=== Clonmel ===
Clonmel - 5 seats
Party	Candidate	FPv%	Count							
Party	Candidate	FPv%	1	2	3	4	5	6	7	8
Workers and Unemployed	Séamus Healy	20.97%	1,582							
Fianna Fáil	Noel Davern TD*	14.13%	1,066	1,085	1,127	1,156	1,276			
Fianna Fáil	Tom Ambrose*	10.6%	796	807	830	847	972	1,017	1,130	1,271
Independent	Ted Boyle	9.52%	718	751	785	864	899	969	1,132	1,408
Labour	Sean Lyons*	7.12%	537	562	630	734	766	821	925	1,116
Fine Gael	Johnny Kehoe*	6.98%	527	530	549	560	568	740	811	
Progressive Democrats	Niall Dennehy	6.26%	472	489	510	535	556	621		
Independent	Brian O'Donnell	6%	452	621	644	700	724	761	835	874
Fine Gael	Dominic O'Hara	5.86%	442	447	466	479	486			
Fianna Fáil	Michael Kennedy	4.69%	354	363	372	392				
Labour	Jimmy Keating	4.02%	303	323	368					
Labour	Mary-Ann Burke	3.92%	296	309						
Electorate: 12,368 Valid: 7,545 (61%) Spoilt: 65 Quota: 1,258 Turnout: 7,610 (61.53%)

=== Fethard ===
Fethard - 6 seats
Party	Candidate	FPv%	Count							
Party	Candidate	FPv%	1	2	3	4	5	6	7	8
Fianna Fáil	Ned Meagher*	17.7%	1,449							
Labour	Ned Brennan*	16.6%	1,360							
Fine Gael	John Holohan*	16.05%	1,314							
Labour	Denis Landy	9.63%	788	793	882	887	988	1,048	1,234	
Fianna Fáil	Denis Bourke*	8.25%	675	719	728	731	793	837	1,074	1,103
Fine Gael	Jimmy Hogan*	7.93%	649	657	673	744	821	919	1,037	1,065
Fianna Fáil	Dick Tobin*	7.67%	628	730	746	769	781	877	1,002	1,009
Fianna Fáil	Patsy Murphy	7.09%	580	617	623	628	712	750		
Progressive Democrats	Jack Murphy	4.58%	375	455	504	537	558			
Independent	Jack Lalor	4.5%	368	371	376	380				
Electorate: 12,561 Valid: 8,186 (65.17%) Spoilt: 87 Quota: 1,170 Turnout: 8,273 (65.86%)

=== Tipperary ===
Tipperary - 5 seats
Party	Candidate	FPv%	Count						
Party	Candidate	FPv%	1	2	3	4	5	6	7
Labour	Michael Ferris TD*	25.84%	1,825						
Fine Gael	Brendan Griffin	11.86%	838	954	966	975	1,128	1,252	
Fine Gael	Michael Fitzgerald*	11.49%	812	880	885	974	1,070	1,150	1,181
Fianna Fáil	Michael Maguire*	11.48%	811	867	869	1,000	1,073	1,220	
Independent	Christy Kinahan	10.84%	766	872	904	918	936	1,080	1,106
Fianna Fáil	John Wallace	9.77%	690	750	764	862	915	1,023	1,040
Labour	Thady Byrnes	6.64%	469	652	674	682	732		
Fine Gael	P.J. Maher	8.12	6%	451	452	456			
Fianna Fáil	Dan O'Keeffe	4.86%	343	363	365				
Workers' Party	Peadar O'Donnell	1.17%	83	97					
Electorate: 10,571 Valid: 7,064 (66.8%) Spoilt: 67 Quota: 1,178 Turnout: 7,131 (67.46%)
