= 1999 South Tipperary County Council election =

Part of the 1999 Irish local elections

- 10 June 1999

All 26 seats to South Tipperary County Council
	First party	Second party	Third party
Party	Fianna Fáil	Fine Gael	Labour
Seats won	12	9	1
Seat change	▲2	Steady	▼3
	Fourth party	Fifth party
Party	Workers and Unemployed	Independent
Seats won	2	2
Seat change	▲1	Steady
- Area of South Tipperary County Council

An election to all 26 seats on South Tipperary County Council took place on 10 June 1999 as part of the 1999 Irish local elections. South Tipperary was divided into five local electoral areas (LEAs) to elect councillors for a five-year term of office on the electoral system of proportional representation by means of the single transferable vote (PR-STV).

== Results by party ==
Party	Seats	±	1st pref	FPv%	±%
Fianna Fáil	12	▲2	14,909	40.15	
Fine Gael	9	Steady	10,419	28.06	
Labour	1	▼3	4,575	12.32	
Workers and Unemployed	2	▲1	2,833	7.63	
Independent	4	Steady	3,742	10.08	
Total	26	Steady	37,129	100.00	—N/a

== Results by local electoral area ==
=== Cahir ===
Cahir: 4 seats
Party	Candidate	FPv%	Count				
Party	Candidate	FPv%	1	2	3	4	5
Fianna Fáil	Michael Anglim*	24.42	1,475				
Fianna Fáil	Mattie McGrath	16.03	968	1,058	1,255		
Fianna Fáil	Barry O'Brien	15.60	942	995	1,137	1,274	
Fine Gael	Liam Ahearn	12.75	770	806	861	1,020	1,045
Fine Gael	Dan Costigan	11.14	673	696	805	1,074	1,114
Labour	Seanie Lonergan	11.14	673	700	736		
Fianna Fáil	Andy Moloney	8.92	539	576			
Electorate: 9,184 Valid: 6,040 (65.77%) Spoilt: 75 Quota: 1,209 Turnout: 6,115 (66.58%)

=== Cashel ===
Cashel: 4 seats
Party	Candidate	FPv%	Count				
Party	Candidate	FPv%	1	2	3	4	5
Fine Gael	Jack Crowe*	21.62	1,444				
Fine Gael	Tom Hayes*	18.36	1,226	1,273	1,377		
Fine Gael	Tom Wood*	16.14	1,078	1,093	1,140	1,329	1,345
Fianna Fáil	Seán McCarthy*	12.75	1,022	1,031	1,194	1,311	1,319
Fianna Fáil	Roger Kennedy	10.99	734	746	917	1,126	1,143
Labour	Pat Barry	9.36	625	638	683		
Fianna Fáil	Bridie Hammersley*	8.23	550	562			
Electorate: 10,808 Valid: 6,679 (61.80%) Spoilt: 93 Quota: 1,336 Turnout: 6,772 (62.66%)

=== Clonmel ===
Clonmel: 7 seats
Party	Candidate	FPv%	Count												
Party	Candidate	FPv%	1	2	3	4	5	6	7	8	9	10	11	12	13
Workers and Unemployed	Seamus Healy*	17.17	1,525												
Fianna Fáil	Tom Ambrose*	13.32	1,183												
Fianna Fáil	Pat Norris*	12.20	1,084	1,111											
Fine Gael	Seán Nyhan	7.58	673	705	712	718	736	753	787	808	848	905	975	1,025	1,078
Fine Gael	Derry Foley	7.20	640	648	654	658	668	674	685	689	701	765	809	842	855
Fianna Fáil	Niall Dennehy	5.61	498	519	520	542	552	564	594	610	630	681	865	940	974
Workers and Unemployed	Phil Prendergast	5.21	463	516	526	529	540	587	620	739	914	990	1,046	1,336	
Fianna Fáil	Bernard Lennon	5.02	446	470	475	486	499	505	523	532	551	595			
Independent	Ted Boyle*	4.73	420	445	451	463	476	493	532	553	592	656	719	787	817
Progressive Democrats	Tina Whitford	4.06	361	374	382	386	396	422	467	488	510				
Workers and Unemployed	Billy Shoer	3.52	313	345	348	349	362	387	406	486	575	635	678		
Workers and Unemployed	Alison Byrne	3.05	271	322	327	330	337	370	404	485					
Workers and Unemployed	Brian O'Donnell	2.94	261	337	338	339	349	385	397						
Labour	Anne Taylor	2.74	243	256	271	273	332	345							
Independent	Terri O'Neill	2.54	226	248	253	254	266								
Labour	Jimmy Keating	2.04	181	195	211	213									
Labour	Canice Egan	1.08	96	99											
Electorate: 15,142 Valid: 8,884 (58.67%) Spoilt: 139 Quota: 1,111 Turnout: 9,023 (59.59%)

=== Fethard ===
Fethard: 6 seats
Party	Candidate	FPv%	Count							
Party	Candidate	FPv%	1	2	3	4	5	6	7	8
Labour	Denis Landy*	14.78	1,247							
Fianna Fáil	Susan Meagher*	13.19	1,113	1,114	1,118	1,129	1,203	1,274		
Independent	Eddie O'Meara	10.40	877	878	881	891	944	997	1,083	1,124
Independent	Waltie Moloney	9.78	825	825	825	831	860	883	919	941
Fianna Fáil	Denis Bourke*	9.27	782	793	794	893	899	982	1,003	1,217
Fianna Fáil	Pat O'Meara	8.71	735	736	739	745	765	847	1,038	1,057
Fine Gael	John Dowley	5.64	560	566	571	643	688	762	777	
Labour	Noel Quinlan	5.64	560	566	578	589	617	628		
Fine Gael	John Fahey	5.61	558	559	569	579	736	742	850	1,121
Fine Gael	Noel Fitzgerald	5.07	428	428	436	442				
Fianna Fáil	Dick Tobin	4.85	409	412	412	444	452			
Progressive Democrats	Tony Kehoe	3.43	289	300	302					
Independent	Sean Clancy	0.63	53	53						
Electorate: 13,749 Valid: 8,436 (61.36%) Spoilt: 151 Quota: 1,206 Turnout: 8,587 (62.46%)

=== Tipperary ===
Tipperary: 5 seats
Party	Candidate	FPv%	Count							
Party	Candidate	FPv%	1	2	3	4	5	6	7	8
Fine Gael	Michael Fitzgerald*	16.87	1,196							
Fianna Fáil	Michael Maguire*	13.54	960	980	1,071	1,074	1,209			
Fianna Fáil	Joe Donovan	12.96	919	943	974	976	1,039	1,047	1,290	
Independent	Christy Kinahan*	12.81	908	1,018	1,141	1,142	1,173	1,175	1,277	
Fine Gael	Brendan Griffin*	8.42	597	630	726	731	929	935	1,067	1,126
Labour	Mick Byrnes	7.94	563	674	703	704	796	804	874	906
Fine Gael	John Clancy	8.12	576	587	608	609				
Fianna Fáil	Bernie Doherty	7.76	550	582	616	617	657	660		
Independent	Denis Leahy	6.12	434	459						
Labour	Billy Bourke	5.46	387							
Electorate: 11,436 Valid: 7,090 (62.00%) Spoilt: 103 Quota: 1,182 Turnout: 7,193 (62.90%)
