= 1985 South Tipperary County Council election =

Part of the 1985 Irish local elections

← 1979	20 June 1985	1991 →

All 26 seats on South Tipperary County Council
	First party	Second party	Third party
Party	Fianna Fáil	Fine Gael	Labour
Seats won	14	8	3
Seat change	+3	0	-1
	Fourth party
Party	Independent
Seats won	1
Seat change	-2
- Map showing the area of South Tipperary County Council
Council control after election
Fianna Fail

An election to South Tipperary County Council took place on 20 June 1985 as part of the Irish local elections. 26 councillors were elected from five local electoral areas (LEAs) for a five-year term of office on the electoral system of proportional representation by means of the single transferable vote (PR-STV). This term was extended for a further year, to 1991.

== Results by party ==
Party	Seats	±	First Pref. votes	FPv%	±%
Fianna Fáil	14	+3	16,537	43.78	
Fine Gael	8	0	10,932	28.94	
Labour	3	-1	4,518	11.96	
Independent	1	-2	3,773	9.99	
Totals	26	-	37,772	100.00	—

== Results by local electoral area ==
=== Cahir ===
Cahir: 5 seats
Party	Candidate	FPv%	Count								
Party	Candidate	FPv%	1	2	3	4	5	6	7	8	9
Fianna Fáil	Seán Byrne TD*		1,447								
Fianna Fáil	John Brennan*		947	1,049	1,063	1,071	1,094	1,146			
Fine Gael	Theresa Ahearn*		905	921	948	959	969	1,006	1,016	1,148	
Fianna Fáil	Con Donovan*		847	943	949	980	989	1,000	1,011	1,069	1,111
Fine Gael	Sean Sampson*		663	680	683	687	705	720	722	869	1,049
Fianna Fáil	Mattie McGrath		588	659	676	681	699	735	741	757	795
Fine Gael	John Arrigan		364	378	379	390	407	415	418		
Labour	Eamonn Shine		257	263	267	280	302	418	425	443	
Labour	John O'Leary		246	253	268	285	296				
Sinn Féin	Jimmy Maher		138	141	144	160					
Independent	Joe Meaney		116	121	130						
Independent	Jim Cooney		98	105							
Electorate: 9,700 Valid: 6,616 (69.04%) Spoilt: 83 Quota: 1,103 Turnout: 6,697

=== Cashel ===
Cashel: 5 seats
Party	Candidate	FPv%	Count						
Party	Candidate	FPv%	1	2	3	4	5	6	7
Fianna Fáil	Dr. Seán McCarthy TD*		1,486						
Fine Gael	Jack Crowe*		1,116	1,142	1,209				
Fine Gael	John Ryan*		766	776	780	806	890	1,019	1,164
Fianna Fáil	Timmy Hammersley*		743	787	801	919	928	1,083	1,217
Independent	John Bergin		637	653	679	702	754	772	
Fianna Fáil	Denis McInerney*		620	725	785	855	882	1,016	1,202
Fine Gael	Tom Wood		572	590	660	667	813	824	1,012
Fianna Fáil	John O'Grady		394	421	424	477	482		
Fine Gael	Patrick Downey		312	315	332	338			
Workers' Party	Sean Hill		299	306					
Fianna Fáil	Kitty Barry		291	314	324				
Electorate: 9,788 Valid: 7,236 (74.58%) Spoilt: 64 Quota: 1,207 Turnout: 7,300

=== Clonmel ===
Clonmel: 5 seats
Party	Candidate	FPv%	Count				
Party	Candidate	FPv%	1	2	3	4	5
Independent	Sean Treacy TD*		2,172				
Fianna Fáil	Noel Davern		1,041	1,141	1,163	1,228	1,302
Fianna Fáil	Tom Ambrose*		950	1,038	1,058	1,119	1,243
Fine Gael	Johnny Kehoe		842	920	938	1,240	1,292
Fianna Fáil	Brendan Cronin		763	869	878	916	1,034
Labour	Sean Lyons*		683	984	1,040	1,109	1,328
Workers and Unemployed	Seamus Healy		535	667	682	719	
Fine Gael	Terence Darmody*		518	579	594		
Labour	Mary-Ann Burke		132	165			
Electorate: 10,807 Valid: 7,636 (71.21%) Spoilt: 60 Quota: 1,273 Turnout: 7,696

=== Fethard ===
Fethard: 6 seats
Party	Candidate	FPv%	Count								
Party	Candidate	FPv%	1	2	3	4	5	6	7	8	9
Fianna Fáil	Ned Meagher		1,464								
Labour	Ned Brennan*		1,135	1,162	1,231	1,237	1,305				
Fine Gael	John Holohan*		930	944	950	952	956	969	1,351		
Fianna Fáil	Dick Tobin*		908	961	973	992	1,016	1,088	1,106	1,108	1,416
Fine Gael	Jimmy Hogan		785	786	790	843	953	1,082	1,168	1,184	1,205
Fianna Fáil	Denis Bourke*		759	773	779	810	863	991	998	998	1,270
Fine Gael	Sean Clancy		653	663	672	673	676	687			
Fianna Fáil	Joe Aherne		644	677	687	691	698	734	763	765	
Fine Gael	James Murphy*		630	631	635	651	676	701	785	812	842
Sinn Féin	Eddie O'Doherty		461	463	492	524	592				
Labour	David Drohan*		367	367	369	401					
Independent	Dick Joy		215	215	217	380					
Workers' Party	Michael Langton		178	181							
Electorate: 12,778 Valid: 9,127 (72.34%) Spoilt: 87 Quota: 1,304 Turnout: 9,244

=== Tipperary ===
Tipperary: 5 seats
Party	Candidate	FPv%	Count						
Party	Candidate	FPv%	1	2	3	4	5	6	7
Labour	Michael Ferris*		1,564						
Fianna Fáil	William Ryan*		1,080	1,127	1,140	1,184	1,221		
Fine Gael	Michael Fitzgerald*		854	920	955	981	1,154	1,591	
Fianna Fáil	Josephine Quinlan*		830	865	877	928	954	1,021	1,094
Fianna Fáil	Michael Maguire		735	774	788	832	861	1,049	1,136
Workers' Party	Christy Kinahan		636	680	748	850	881	896	916
Fine Gael	P.J. Maher*		607	633	640	646	786		
Fine Gael	Denis Leahy		415	441	452	465			
Sinn Féin	Finbarr Kissane		302	324	342				
Labour	Paddy Cummins		134	200					
Electorate: 10,716 Valid: 7,157 (67.7%) Spoilt: 98 Quota: 1,193 Turnout: 7,255
