= Right2Change =

Political campaign in Ireland

Right2Change is a political campaign that arose from the Right2Water campaign in Ireland, built around a document called "Policy Principles for a Progressive Irish Government". The principles centre on areas like health, housing, jobs education and dealing with debt.

The principles are the outcome of an extensive consultation process between individuals, community groups, trade unionists, political parties and independent representatives – all of whom have been involved in the campaigning against Irish Water's introduction of water charges in Ireland. The aim of the supporters of the principles is to campaign against the "right-wing consensus" that has dominated Irish politics and eventually form a left-wing government. The trade unions involved are set to give their support to election candidates if they sign up to the movement's policies. Country-wide meetings to discuss the campaign started in September 2015.

The campaign is supported by trade unions Unite the Union, the Communication Workers Union, and Mandate. The Civil and Public Services Union withdrew their support.

Political groups supporting the campaign are the Communist Party of Ireland, Direct Democracy Ireland, the People Before Profit Alliance, Sinn Féin, Workers and Unemployed Action and well as Joan Collins, Clare Daly, Thomas Pringle, Tommy Broughan and Mick Wallace. The Anti-Austerity Alliance/Socialist Party did not sign up, its representative Ruth Coppinger accusing Sinn Féin of using the Right2Change campaign to further the party's agenda.

32 Right2Change candidates were elected in the 2016 general election including the 23 Sinn Féin members, four Independents 4 Change members (Wallace, Daly, Collins and Broughan), three People Before Profit Alliance members (Richard Boyd Barrett, Bríd Smith and Gino Kenny) along with Séamus Healy (WUA) and the independent Thomas Pringle.
