= 2001 Tipperary South by-election =

By-election to the 28th Dáil

- 30 June 2001
- Turnout: 31,907 (58.5%)
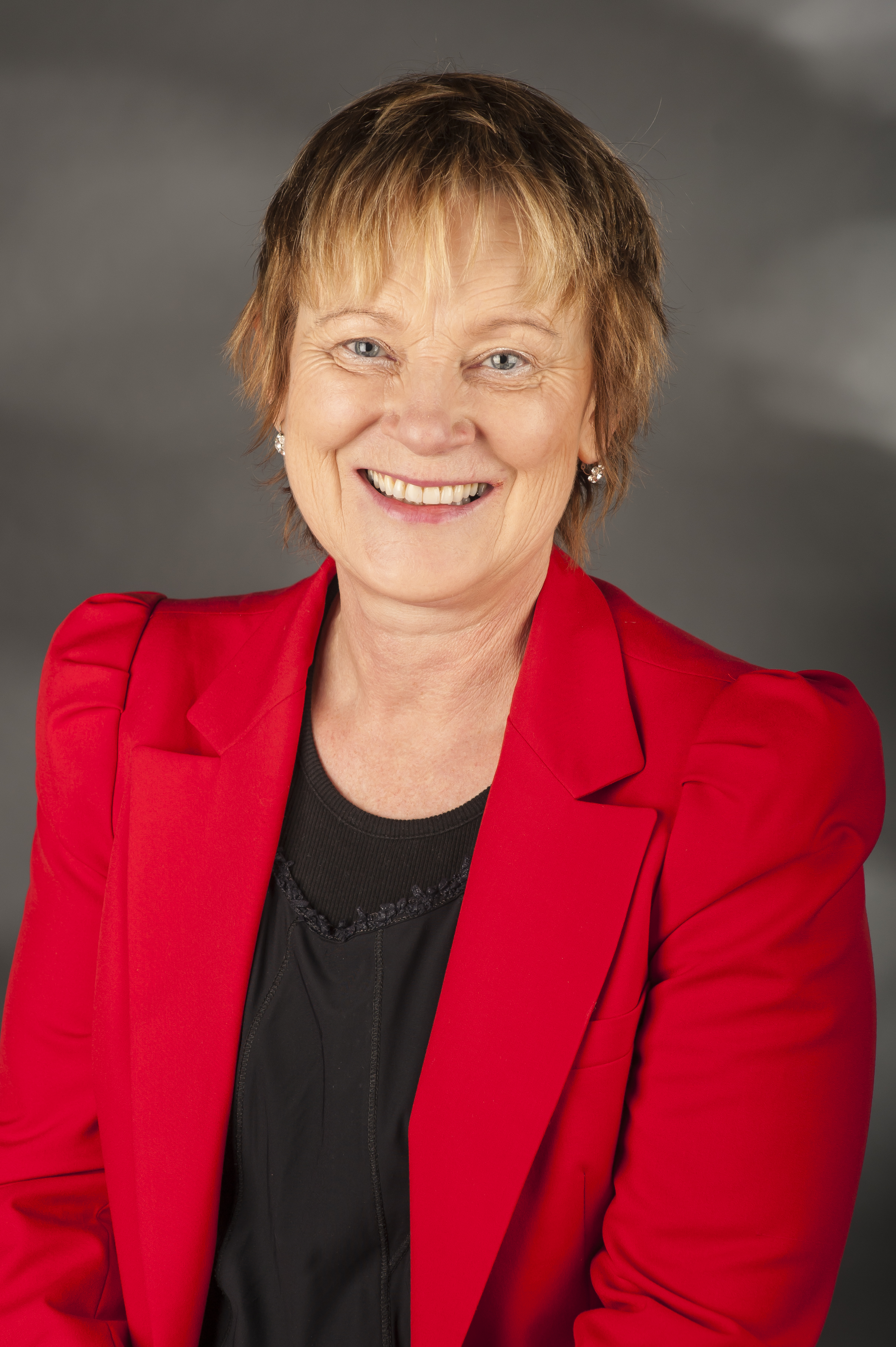
	Hayes	Maguire
Nominee	Tom Hayes	Michael Maguire	Phil Prendergast
Party	Fine Gael	Fianna Fáil	Independent
First preferences	11,446	8,461	7,897
Percentage	35.9%	26.5%	24.8%
Final count	15,791	–	12,891
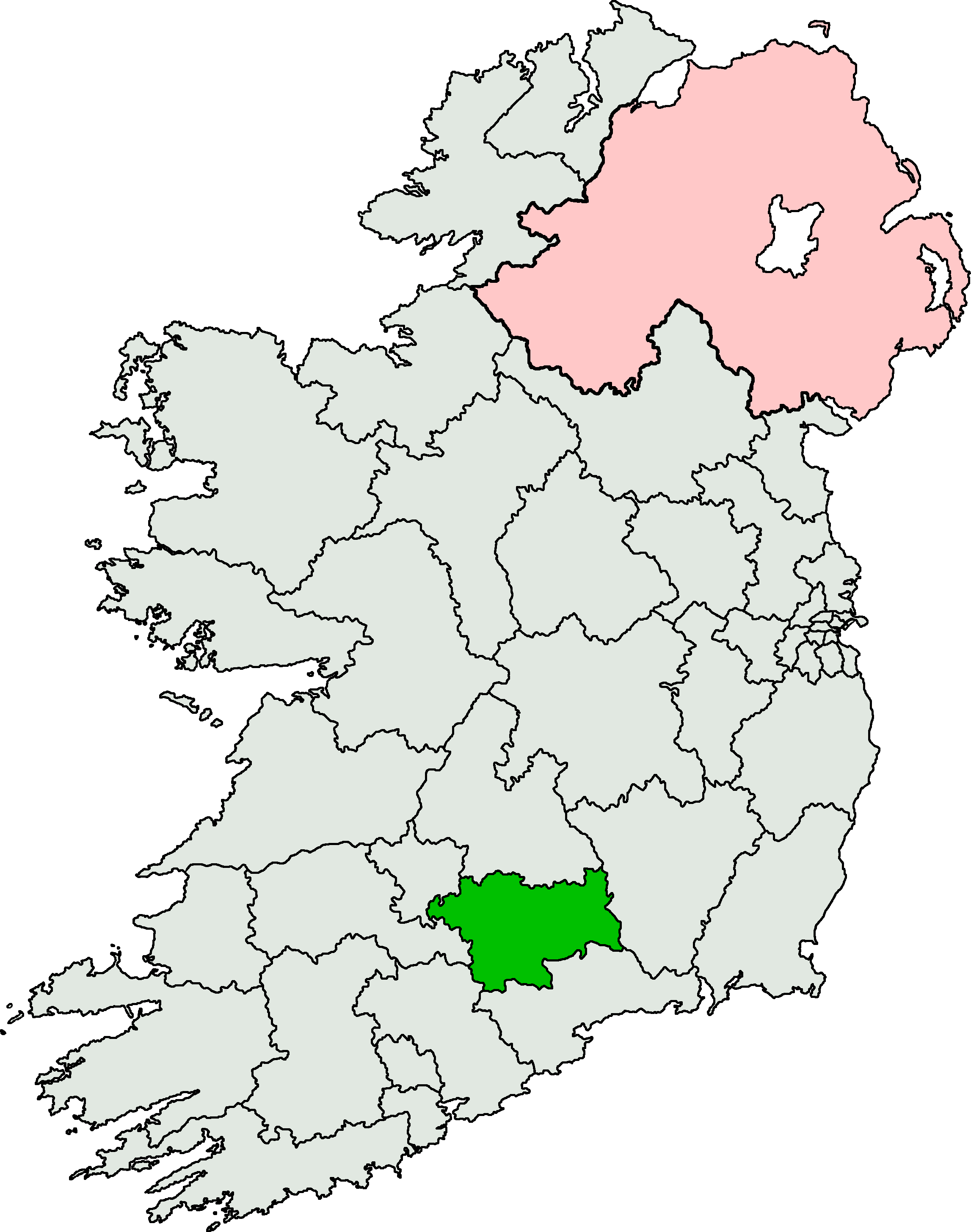
- Tipperary South shown within Ireland
TD before election
Theresa Ahearn
Fine Gael
TD after election
Tom Hayes
Fine Gael

A Dáil by-election was held in the constituency of Tipperary South in Ireland on Saturday, 30 June 2001, to fill a vacancy in the 28th Dáil. It followed the death of Fine Gael Teachta Dála (TD) Theresa Ahearn on 20 September 2000.

The writ of election to fill the vacancy was agreed by the Dáil on 31 May 2001.

The by-election was won by the Fine Gael candidate, Senator Tom Hayes.

The other candidates were Phil Prendergast standing as an independent, Michael Maguire for Fianna Fáil and Denis Landy for the Labour Party. Prendergast, Maguire and Landy were all members of South Tipperary County Council at the time.

This was the second by-election in Tipperary South during the 28th Dáil.

== Result ==
2001 Tipperary South by-election
Party	Candidate	FPv%	Count		
Party	Candidate	FPv%	1	2	3
Fine Gael	Tom Hayes	35.9	11,446	12,513	15,791
Fianna Fáil	Michael Maguire	26.5	8,461	9,251	
Independent	Phil Prendergast	24.8	7,897	9,376	12,891
Labour	Denis Landy	12.9	4,103		
Electorate: 54,542 Valid: 31,907 Quota: 15,954 Turnout: 58.5%
