= 2009 South Tipperary County Council election =

Part of the 2009 Irish local elections

- 5 June 2009

All 26 seats on South Tipperary County Council
	First party	Second party	Third party
Party	Fine Gael	Fianna Fáil	Labour
Seats won	12	6	3
Seat change	+4	-4	+1
	Fourth party
Party	Independent
Seats won	5
Seat change	-1
- Map showing the area of South Tipperary County Council
Council control after election
TBD

An election to South Tipperary County Council took place on 5 June 2009 as part of that year's Irish local elections. 26 councillors were elected from five local electoral areas (LEAs) for a five-year term of office on the electoral system of proportional representation by means of the single transferable vote (PR-STV).

== Results by party ==
Party	Seats	±	First Pref. votes	FPv%	±%
Fine Gael	12	+4			
Fianna Fáil	6	-4			
Labour	3	+1			
Independent	5	-1			
Totals	26	-		100.0	—

== Results by local electoral area ==
=== Cahir ===
Cahir – 4 seats
Party	Candidate	FPv%	Count				
Party	Candidate	FPv%	1	2	3	4	5
Labour	Seanie Lonergan*	16.96	1,139	1,188	1,213	1,346	
Fianna Fáil	Michael Anglim*	16.72	1,123	1,137	1,219	1,274	1,342
Fine Gael	Liam Ahearn*	15.01	1,008	1,016	1,037	1,104	1,376
Fine Gael	Marie Murphy	14.59	980	991	1,038	1,105	1,292
Fianna Fáil	Andy Moloney*	12.63	848	858	981	1,065	1,139
Fine Gael	John G. O'Donnell	8.68	583	593	617	699	
Independent	Dan Costigan	7.27	488	536	563		
Fianna Fáil	Tommy Meehan	5.38	361	370			
Sinn Féin	Kevin Brunnick	2.76	185				
Electorate: 10,033 Valid: 6,715 (66.93%) Spoilt: 84 Quota: 1,344 Turnout: 6,799 (67.77%)

=== Cashel ===
Cashel – 4 seats
Party	Candidate	FPv%	Count				
Party	Candidate	FPv%	1	2	3	4	5
Fine Gael	Jack Crowe*	19.25	1,264	1,347			
Independent	Tom Wood*	17.99	1,181	1,332			
Fianna Fáil	Dr. Seán McCarthy*	17.54	1,152	1,196	1,364		
Fianna Fáil	Roger Kennedy*	13.94	915	978	1,124	1,156	1,167
Fine Gael	Catherine McLoughlin	13.86	910	1,005	1,159	1,177	1,199
Independent	Liam Browne	9.18	603	680			
Labour	Patrick Downey	8.24	541				
Electorate: 10,481 Valid: 6,566 (62.65%) Spoilt: 88 Quota: 1,314 Turnout: 6,654 (63.49%)

=== Clonmel ===
Clonmel – 7 seats
Party	Candidate	FPv%	Count										
Party	Candidate	FPv%	1	2	3	4	5	6	7	8	9	10	11
Workers and Unemployed	Seamus Healy*	21.78	2,336										
Fianna Fáil	Siobhán Ambrose	10.82	1,160	1,214	1,292	1,331	1,368						
Fine Gael	Tom Acheson	8.23	883	905	922	944	992	1,054	1,175	1,179	1,510		
Labour	Darren Ryan*	7.87	844	928	986	1,142	1,216	1,240	1,319	1,324	1,421		
Fine Gael	Michael Murphy	7.80	837	876	889	915	958	989	1,065	1,067	1,355		
Fine Gael	Derry Foley*	6.61	709	726	739	762	804	844	971	974			
Workers and Unemployed	Pat English	6.28	674	954	979	1,021	1,063	1,091	1,135	1,136	1,170	1,192	1,203
Fianna Fáil	Richie Molloy	5.53	593	663	725	750	798	991	1,038	1,048	1,120	1,189	1,202
Workers and Unemployed	Billy Shoer*	5.41	580	868	893	930	978	995	1,033	1,035	1,083	1,125	1,144
Fianna Fáil	Mark Davern	4.53	486	500	515	520	528						
Fine Gael	Denis Dunne	4.45	477	504	516	531	569	603					
Green	Bernard Lennon	3.81	409	451	465	492							
Labour	Gabrielle Egan	3.68	395	432	449								
Fianna Fáil	Martin O'Brien	3.19	342	363									
Electorate: 16,776 Valid: 10,725 (63.93%) Spoilt: 135 Quota: 1,341 Turnout: 10,860 (64.74%)

=== Fethard ===
Fethard – 6 seats
Party	Candidate	FPv%	Count										
Party	Candidate	FPv%	1	2	3	4	5	6	7	8	9	10	11
Fine Gael	Jimmy O'Brien	23.92	2,438										
Fine Gael	Joe Brennan	11.08	1,130	1,287	1,306	1,347	1,418	1,441	1,454	1,552			
Fine Gael	John Fahey*	9.32	950	1,255	1,259	1,265	1,272	1,377	1,449	1,452	1,453	1,612	
Labour	Denis Landy*	8.97	914	943	959	1,001	1,065	1,173	1,181	1,266	1,280	1,297	1,507
Independent	Eddie O'Meara*	8.40	856	1,006	1,016	1,021	1,041	1,066	1,136	1,147	1,152	1,210	1,257
Fianna Fáil	Pat O'Meara	6.08	620	675	675	675	676	700	826	842	843	964	978
Fianna Fáil	Sylvia Cooney-Sheehan	5.91	602	615	622	682	755	760	802	1,011	1,051	1,106	1,230
Sinn Féin	David Dunne	5.11	521	531	539	559	593	621	627	664	678	690	
Fianna Fáil	Kieran Bourke*	4.32	440	443	448	475	508	509	523				
Fianna Fáil	Benny Tynan	3.62	369	473	477	477	479	500	556	566	567		
Fianna Fáil	Michael Cooney	3.58	365	433	435	436	440	467					
Labour	Michael Cleere	3.38	345	410	410	411	414						
Independent	Pierce O'Loughlin	2.83	288	293	307	353							
Independent	Noel Brophy	2.30	234	238	264								
Independent	Colin Simpson	1.20	122	135									
Electorate: 14,896 Valid: 10,194 (68.43%) Spoilt: 179 Quota: 1,457 Turnout: 10,373 (69.64%)

=== Tipperary ===
Tipperary – 5 seats
Party	Candidate	FPv%	Count										
Party	Candidate	FPv%	1	2	3	4	5	6	7	8	9	10	11
Fine Gael	Michael Fitzgerald*	22.35	2,034										
Fine Gael	John Crosse*	12.85	1,169	1,270	1,325	1,408	1,435	1,502	1,512	1,565			
Fine Gael	Mary Hourigan	12.48	1,136	1,269	1,319	1,392	1,416	1,536					
Fianna Fáil	Joe Donovan*	8.91	811	901	909	921	938	1,011	1,014	1,040	1,133	1,134	1,250
Fianna Fáil	Michael Maguire*	8.13	740	779	788	810	816	878	882	915	1,070	1,074	1,248
Independent	Denis Leahy	6.87	625	655	667	680	708	712	712	874	978	990	1,292
Labour	Mick Byrnes	6.80	619	645	663	699	805	814	815	878	937	950	
Fianna Fáil	Dr. John Wallace	5.13	467	483	491	498	518	531	532	585			
Independent	Christy Kinahan*	4.39	399	422	439	447	486	490	490				
Fianna Fáil	Patrick Fahey	3.71	338	345	365	370	370						
Labour	Billy Bourke	2.92	266	277	297	306							
Independent	Paul Barry	2.77	252	259									
Fine Gael	David Byrnes	2.67	243	277	283								
Electorate: 13,729 Valid: 9,099 (66.28%) Spoilt: 150 Quota: 1,517 Turnout: 9,249 (67.37%)
