= Séamus Healy =

Irish politician (born 1950)

Séamus Healy TD
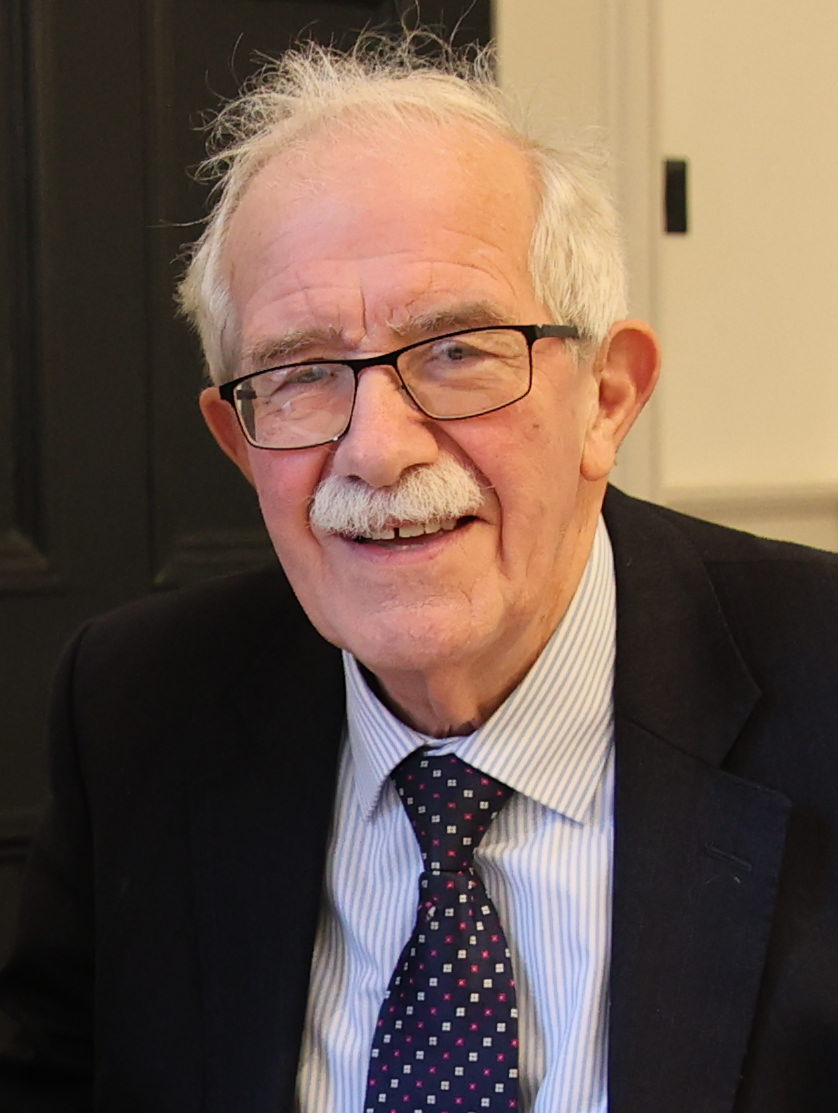
- Healy in 2024

Teachta Dála
- Incumbent
- Assumed office November 2024
- In office February 2011 – February 2016
- In office June 2000 – May 2007
- Constituency: Tipperary South
- In office February 2016 – February 2020
- Constituency: Tipperary

South Tipperary County Councillor
- In office 2007–2011
- In office 1991–2004
- Constituency: Clonmel

Clonmel Borough Councillor
- In office 1985–2004
- Constituency: Clonmel Borough

Personal details
- Born: 9 August 1950 (age 76) Waterford, Ireland
- Party: Independent
- Other political affiliations: Workers and Unemployed Action

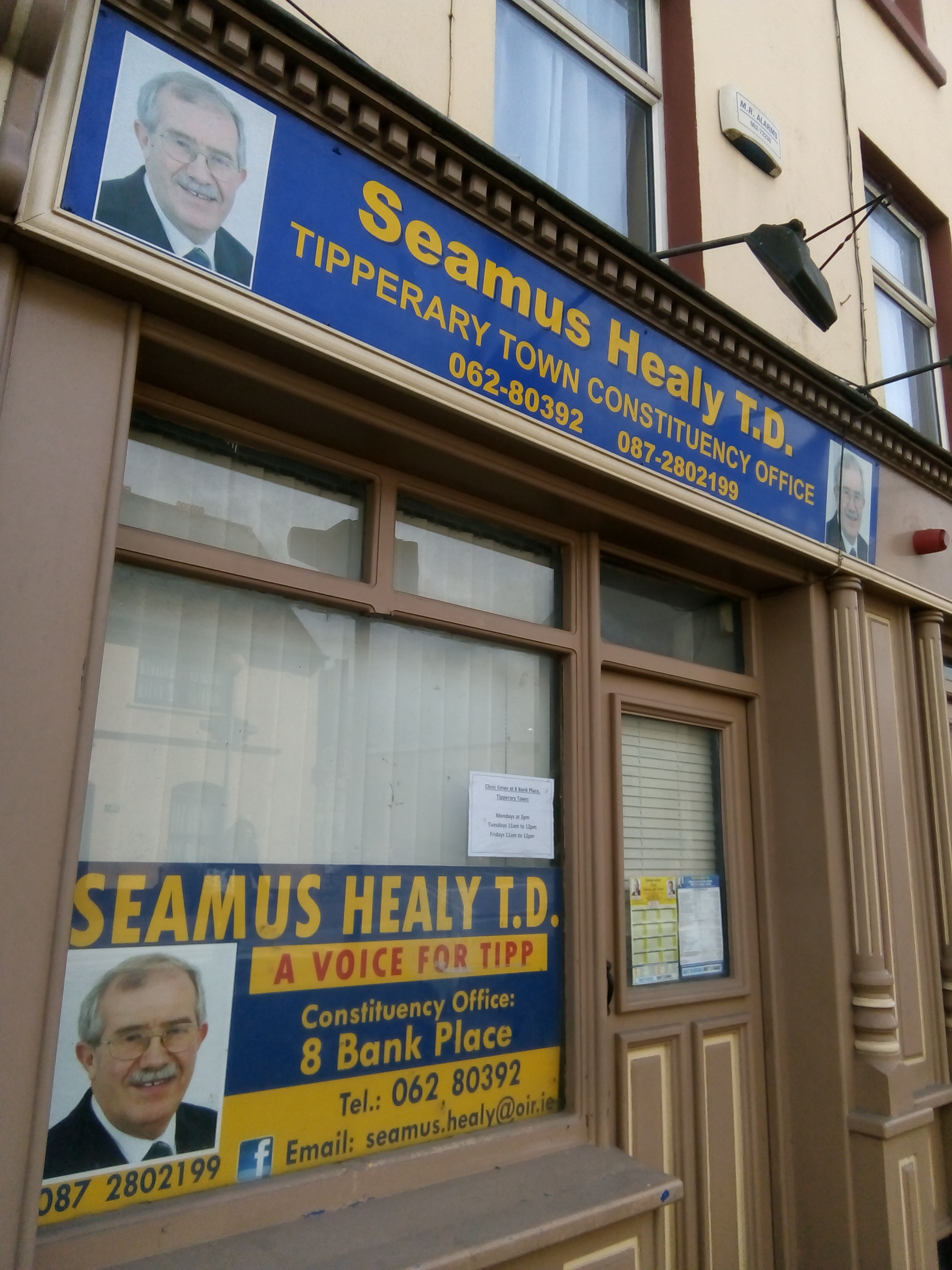
Healy's constituency office in Tipperary

Séamus Healy (born 9 August 1950) is an Irish independent politician who has been a Teachta Dála (TD) for the Tipperary South constituency intermittently since a 2000 by-election. Healy was most recently elected at the 2024 general election.

He is part of the Clonmel-based Workers and Unemployed Action (WUA) which had a number of local representatives on South Tipperary County Council and Clonmel Borough Council. He is a former member of the League for a Workers Republic.

== Career ==
Having worked as Hospital Administrator for South Tipperary Acute Hospital Services from 1978 to 1999, Healy was first elected to Clonmel Borough Council in 1985. He was elected to the 28th Dáil at a by-election on 22 June 2000. He was re-elected at the 2002 general election, but lost his seat at the 2007 general election to Martin Mansergh of Fianna Fáil. After losing his Dáil seat, he returned to serve as a South Tipperary County Councillor for the Clonmel local electoral area, being co-opted for Pat English, after which he was appointed to various committees such as the local Vocational Education Committee, promotion of the Irish language and various water supply committees.

Healy was re-elected to South Tipperary County Council at the 2009 local elections.

He won back his seat at the 2011 general election with 21.3 per cent of the first preference vote and served on the Oireachtas Joint Committee on Health and Children.

On 15 December 2011, he helped launch a nationwide campaign against the household charge being brought in as part of the 2012 Irish budget.

He stood for re-election to the new Tipperary constituency as an Independent in the 2016 general election, and was elected on the seventh count. He voted for both Gerry Adams and Richard Boyd Barrett for Taoiseach when the 32nd Dáil first met.

Healy's brother Paddy Healy served as president of the Teachers' Union of Ireland and ran unsuccessfully in the Seanad elections in 2007 and 2011 for the NUI panel, and in the 1980s ran in the Dublin North-East constituency as an Anti H-Block candidate. He worked as a voluntary researcher for Seamus.

He lost his seat at the 2020 general election. Following his defeat, Healy said: “I’ve been here before. I’ve been an activist all my life. I lost in 2007 by 59 votes. I will continue to be an activist. Life is like that: you win some, you lost some. You pick yourself up, dust yourself down, and keep going.”

In September 2023, Healy confirmed that he would be running in the 2024 general election for Tipperary South, following boundary changes that split Tipperary back into two constituencies. He stated that the unification of south and north Tipperary into a single Dáil constituency and local authority had been disastrous for south Tipperary, which he believed was playing "second fiddle" to north Tipperary.

At the 2024 general election, Healy was elected to the Dáil with 9,601 votes. Aged 74, he was one of the oldest candidates in the general election, and is one of the oldest TDs elected to the Dáil. Healy's first speech in the 34th Dáil focused on the "housing and homelessness crisis" which he stated is the "most fundamental issue facing this country". He announced his intention to reintroduce his Housing Emergency Measures in the Public Interest Bill.

== Election results ==
Elections to the Dáil
Party	Election		FPv	FPv%	Result
Independent	Tipperary South	1987	1,457	3.5	Eliminated on count 2/8
Independent	Tipperary South	1989	2,859	7.3	Eliminated on count 2/5
Independent	Tipperary South	1992	4,023	10.1	Eliminated on count 5/5
Independent	Tipperary South	1997	5,814	16.5	Eliminated on count 5/5
Independent	Tipperary South	2000 by-election	9,419	30.8	Elected on count 3/3
Independent	Tipperary South	2002	7,350	20.1	Elected on count 3/3
Independent	Tipperary South	2007	5,707	14.7	Eliminated on count 8/8
WUA	Tipperary South	2011	8,818	21.3	Elected on count 3/5
Independent	Tipperary	2016	7,452	9.6	Elected on count 7/7
Independent	Tipperary	2020	5,829	7.1	Eliminated on count 7/9
Independent	Tipperary South	2024	4,795	11.7	Elected on count 6/6

Elections to South Tipperary County Council and Tipperary County Council
Party	Election		FPv	FPv%	Result
WUA	Clonmel LEA	1985	535	7.0	Eliminated on count 4/5
WUA	Clonmel LEA	1991	1,582	21.0	Elected on count 1/8
WUA	Clonmel LEA	1999	1,525	17.7	Elected on count 1/13
WUA	Clonmel LEA	2009	2,336	21.8	Elected on count 1/11

Dáil	Election	Deputy (Party)	Deputy (Party)	Deputy (Party)	Deputy (Party)
13th	1948	Michael Davern (FF)	Richard Mulcahy (FG)	Dan Breen (FF)	John Timoney (CnaP)
14th	1951	Michael Davern (FF)	Richard Mulcahy (FG)	Dan Breen (FF)	Patrick Crowe (FG)
15th	1954	Michael Davern (FF)	Richard Mulcahy (FG)	Dan Breen (FF)	Patrick Crowe (FG)
16th	1957	Michael Davern (FF)	Richard Mulcahy (FG)	Dan Breen (FF)	Frank Loughman (FF)
17th	1961	Michael Davern (FF)	Patrick Hogan (FG)	Dan Breen (FF)	Seán Treacy (Note: Treacy served as Ceann Comhairle in the 20th Dáil from 1973 to 1977, and was returned automatically at the 1977 election. He lost the Labour party whip in February 1985.) (Lab)
18th	1965	Don Davern (FF)	Patrick Hogan (FG)	Jackie Fahey (FF)	Seán Treacy (Lab)
19th	1969	Noel Davern (FF)	Patrick Hogan (FG)	Jackie Fahey (FF)	Seán Treacy (Lab)
20th	1973	Noel Davern (FF)	Brendan Griffin (FG)	Jackie Fahey (FF)	Seán Treacy (Lab)
21st	1977	Noel Davern (FF)	Brendan Griffin (FG)	3 seats 1977–1981	Seán Treacy (Lab)
22nd	1981	Carrie Acheson (FF)	Brendan Griffin (FG)	Seán McCarthy (FF)	Seán Treacy (Lab)
23rd	1982 (Feb)	Seán Byrne (FF)	Brendan Griffin (FG)	Seán McCarthy (FF)	Seán Treacy (Lab)
24th	1982 (Nov)	Seán Byrne (FF)	Brendan Griffin (FG)	Seán McCarthy (FF)	Seán Treacy (Lab)
25th	1987	Noel Davern (FF)	Brendan Griffin (FG)	Seán McCarthy (FF)	Seán Treacy (Note: Treacy served as Ceann Comhairle in the 25th, 26th and 27th Dáil from 1987 to 1997, and was returned automatically at the 1989 and 1992 elections.) (Ind.)
26th	1989	Noel Davern (FF)	Theresa Ahearn (FG)	Michael Ferris (Lab)	Seán Treacy (Ind.)
27th	1992	Noel Davern (FF)	Theresa Ahearn (FG)	Michael Ferris (Lab)	Seán Treacy (Ind.)
28th	1997	Noel Davern (FF)	Theresa Ahearn (FG)	Michael Ferris (Lab)	3 seats from 1997
28th	2000 by-election	Noel Davern (FF)	Theresa Ahearn (FG)	Séamus Healy (Ind.)	3 seats from 1997
28th	2001 by-election	Noel Davern (FF)	Tom Hayes (FG)	Séamus Healy (Ind.)	3 seats from 1997
29th	2002	Noel Davern (FF)	Tom Hayes (FG)	Séamus Healy (Ind.)	3 seats from 1997
30th	2007	Mattie McGrath (FF)	Tom Hayes (FG)	Martin Mansergh (FF)	3 seats from 1997
31st	2011	Mattie McGrath (Ind.)	Tom Hayes (FG)	Séamus Healy (WUA)	3 seats from 1997
32nd	2016	Constituency abolished. See Tipperary			

Dáil	Election	Deputy (Party)	Deputy (Party)	Deputy (Party)
34th	2024	Mattie McGrath (Ind.)	Michael Murphy (FG)	Séamus Healy (Ind.)

Dáil	Election	Deputy (Party)	Deputy (Party)	Deputy (Party)	Deputy (Party)	Deputy (Party)	Deputy (Party)	Deputy (Party)
4th	1923	Dan Breen (Rep)	Séamus Burke (CnaG)	Louis Dalton (CnaG)	Daniel Morrissey (Lab)	Patrick Ryan (Rep)	Michael Heffernan (FP)	Seán McCurtin (CnaG)
5th	1927 (Jun)	Seán Hayes (FF)	Séamus Burke (CnaG)	John Hassett (CnaG)	Daniel Morrissey (Lab)	William O'Brien (Lab)	Michael Heffernan (FP)	Andrew Fogarty (FF)
6th	1927 (Sep)	Seán Hayes (FF)	Séamus Burke (CnaG)	John Hassett (CnaG)	Daniel Morrissey (Lab)	Timothy Sheehy (FF)	Michael Heffernan (FP)	Andrew Fogarty (FF)
7th	1932	Seán Hayes (FF)	Séamus Burke (CnaG)	John Hassett (CnaG)	Daniel Morrissey (Ind.)	Timothy Sheehy (FF)	Dan Breen (FF)	Andrew Fogarty (FF)
8th	1933	Seán Hayes (FF)	Séamus Burke (CnaG)	Richard Curran (NCP)	Daniel Morrissey (CnaG)	Martin Ryan (FF)	Dan Breen (FF)	Andrew Fogarty (FF)
9th	1937	William O'Brien (Lab)	Séamus Burke (FG)	Jeremiah Ryan (FG)	Daniel Morrissey (FG)	Martin Ryan (FF)	Dan Breen (FF)	Andrew Fogarty (FF)
10th	1938	Frank Loughman (FF)	Richard Curran (FG)	Jeremiah Ryan (FG)	Daniel Morrissey (FG)	Martin Ryan (FF)	Dan Breen (FF)	Andrew Fogarty (FF)
11th	1943	Richard Stapleton (Lab)	William O'Donnell (CnaT)	Jeremiah Ryan (FG)	Daniel Morrissey (FG)	Martin Ryan (FF)	Dan Breen (FF)	Andrew Fogarty (FF)
12th	1944	Frank Loughman (FF)	William O'Donnell (CnaT)	Richard Mulcahy (FG)	Daniel Morrissey (FG)	Mary Ryan (FF)	Dan Breen (FF)	Andrew Fogarty (FF)
12th	1947 by-election	Frank Loughman (FF)	Patrick Kinane (CnaP)	Richard Mulcahy (FG)	Daniel Morrissey (FG)	Mary Ryan (FF)	Dan Breen (FF)	Andrew Fogarty (FF)
13th	1948	Constituency abolished. See Tipperary North and Tipperary South						

Dáil	Election	Deputy (Party)	Deputy (Party)	Deputy (Party)	Deputy (Party)	Deputy (Party)
32nd	2016	Séamus Healy (WUA)	Alan Kelly (Lab)	Jackie Cahill (FF)	Michael Lowry (Ind.)	Mattie McGrath (Ind.)
33rd	2020	Martin Browne (SF)	Alan Kelly (Lab)	Jackie Cahill (FF)	Michael Lowry (Ind.)	Mattie McGrath (Ind.)
34th	2024	Constituency abolished. See Tipperary North and Tipperary South				
