= Civic Offices =

Civic Offices may refer to the following municipal facilities:

- Bexley Civic Offices, Bexleyheath, London
- Civic Offices, Clonmel, County Tipperary, Ireland
- Civic Offices, Dungarvan, County Waterford, Ireland
- Civic Offices, Limerick, County Limerick, Ireland
- Civic Offices, Nenagh, County Tipperary, Ireland
- Sutton Civic Offices, London
- Woking Civic Offices, Surrey, England
