= 1999 Waterford County Council election =

Part of the 1999 Irish local elections

- 10 June 1999

All 23 seats to Waterford County Council
	First party	Second party	Third party
Party	Fianna Fáil	Fine Gael	Labour
Seats won	11	8	3
Seat change	+1	-1	0
	Fourth party	Fifth party
Party	Independent	Workers' Party
Seats won	1	0
Seat change	+1	-1
- Map showing the area of Waterford County Council
Council control after election
TBD

An election to Waterford County Council took place on 10 June 1999 as part of that year's Irish local elections. 23 councillors were elected from five local electoral areas for a five-year term of office on the system of proportional representation by means of the single transferable vote (PR-STV).

== Results by party ==
Party	Seats	±	First Pref. votes	FPv%	±%
Fianna Fáil	11	+1	10,351	41.64	
Fine Gael	8	-1	7,914	31.84	
Labour	3	0	3,874	15.59	
Independent	1	+1	1,581	6.36	
Workers' Party	0	-1	320	1.29	
Totals	23	0	24,857	100.00	—

== Results by local electoral area ==
=== Dungarvan ===
Dungarvan - 7 seats
Party	Candidate	FPv%	Count									
Party	Candidate	FPv%	1	2	3	4	5	6	7	8	9	10
Fine Gael	John Deasy	14.08	1,083									
Fine Gael	Tom Higgins	11.11	855	888	909	959	963					
Labour	Billy Kyne*	8.32	640	649	665	691	702	751	794	813	927	969
Fianna Fáil	Patrick Kenneally*	8.28	637	641	643	648	712	722	785	865	887	978
Labour	Fiachra O Ceillchair*	8.27	636	645	661	681	690	724	755	841	893	929
Labour	Lar Hart*	6.77	521	526	550	560	562	587	601	623	693	710
Fine Gael	Daniel Leahy*	5.90	454	462	464	468	502	542	555	579	591	
Fianna Fáil	Tom Cronin	5.85	450	452	459	461	560	569	604	670	682	824
Fianna Fáil	Nuala Ryan	5.65	435	440	446	467	487	511	594	642	728	754
Independent	Michael O'Riordan	4.95	381	388	396	409	418	455	487	504		
Fianna Fáil	Seamus O'Donnell	4.71	362	362	364	370	387	401	415			
Fianna Fáil	Austin Flynn*	3.73	287	293	300	335	345	363				
Fine Gael	Damien Geoghegan	3.60	277	298	312	336	340					
Fianna Fáil	Paud O'Keeffe	4.03	310	311	315	319						
Independent	Damien Dillon	2.94	226	231	236							
Independent	Dan Dineen	1.81	139	143								
Electorate: 12,456 Valid: 7,693 (61.76%) Spoilt: 92 Quota: 962 Turnout: 7,785 (62.50%)

=== Kilmacthomas ===
Kilmacthomas - 3 seats
Party	Candidate	FPv%	Count	
Party	Candidate	FPv%	1	2
Fianna Fáil	Tom Cunningham*	24.27	727	
Labour	Ger Barron	21.77	652	752
Fianna Fáil	Pat Leahy*	21.60	647	741
Fine Gael	Oliver Coffey*	16.46	493	693
Fine Gael	Eddie Rockett	15.89	476	
Electorate: 5,456 Valid: 2,995 (54.89%) Spoilt: 35 Quota: 749 Turnout: 3,030 (55.54%)

=== Lismore ===
Lismore - 4 seats
Party	Candidate	FPv%	Count			
Party	Candidate	FPv%	1	2	3	4
Fianna Fáil	Ollie Wilkinson*	38.57	1,859			
Fine Gael	Nora Flynn*	16.76	808	1,048		
Fine Gael	Willie McDonnell*	13.17	635	726	882	908
Fianna Fáil	James Tobin	12.24	590	827	907	936
Fianna Fáil	Dick Tobin	9.79	472	689	846	874
Labour	Bernard Leddy	9.46	456	565		
Electorate: 8,058 Valid: 4,820 (59.82%) Spoilt: 61 Quota: 965 Turnout: 4,881 (60.57%)

=== Suir ===
Suir - 3 seats
Party	Candidate	FPv%	Count						
Party	Candidate	FPv%	1	2	3	4	5	6	7
Fianna Fáil	Kieran O'Ryan*	24.29	818	827	876				
Fine Gael	Mary Greene*	21.56	726	729	732	799	937		
Labour	Victor Bowers	15.24	513	540	595	631	669	690	693
Fine Gael	Paudie Coffey	14.26	480	486	518	564	621	688	700
Fianna Fáil	Oliver O'Hara	8.38	282	285	348	423			
Independent	Bobby Moore	7.93	267	271	280				
Fianna Fáil	Michael O'Brien	6.59	222	224					
Sinn Féin	Jackie Whelan	1.75	59						
Electorate: 5,534 Valid: 3,367 (60.84%) Spoilt: 52 Quota: 842 Turnout: 3,419 (61.78%)

=== Tramore ===
Tramore - 6 seats
Party	Candidate	FPv%	Count									
Party	Candidate	FPv%	1	2	3	4	5	6	7	8	9	10
Fine Gael	John Carey*	13.57	812	814	818	825	918					
Fianna Fáil	Dan Cowman*	12.04	720	732	803	883						
Fianna Fáil	Pat Daly	11.33	678	680	706	714	730	734	761	822	829	838
Fianna Fáil	Geoff Power*	10.03	600	602	612	625	632	637	697	738	743	748
Fine Gael	Lola O'Sullivan	7.94	475	505	545	572	686	716	765	912		
Labour	Paddy O'Callaghan*	7.62	456	469	490	542	566	571	621	716	728	734
Independent	Betty Twomey	6.85	410	439	456	499	537	541	651	760	793	801
Progressive Democrats	Michael Flynn	6.47	387	410	444	473	509	520	571			
Green	Michael Power	6.20	371	376	384	417	436	440				
Fine Gael	Maurice Cummins	5.68	340	344	365	374						
Workers' Party	Eddie Walsh	5.35	320	324	336							
Fianna Fáil	Ben Gavin	4.26	255	276								
Independent	Ted O'Keeffe	2.64	158									
Electorate: 12,013 Valid: 5,982 (49.80%) Spoilt: 71 Quota: 855 Turnout: 6,053 (50.39%)
