= 1999 Waterford Corporation election =

Part of the 1999 Irish local elections

- 10 June 1999

All 15 seats to Waterford City Council
	First party	Second party	Third party
Party	Fianna Fáil	Fine Gael	Workers' Party
Seats won	4	3	3
Seat change	+1	+1	0
	Fourth party	Fifth party	Sixth party
Party	Labour	Progressive Democrats	Independent
Seats won	2	1	2
Seat change	-1	-1	0
- Map showing the area of Waterford City Council
Council control after election
TBD

An election to Waterford City Council took place on 10 June 1999 as part of that year's Irish local elections. 15 councillors were elected from three local electoral areas for a five-year term of office on the system of proportional representation by means of the single transferable vote (PR-STV).

== Results by party ==
Party	Seats	±	First Pref. votes	FPv%	±%
Fianna Fáil	4	+1	2,679	20.39	
Fine Gael	3	+1	2,708	20.61	
Workers' Party	3	0	2,210	16.82	
Labour	2	-1	1,804	13.73	
Progressive Democrats	1	-1	504	3.84	
Independent	2	0	2,785	21.19	
Totals	15	0	13,142	100.00	—

== Results by local electoral area ==
=== Waterford No.1 ===
Waterford No.1 - 4 seats
Party	Candidate	FPv%	Count					
Party	Candidate	FPv%	1	2	3	4	5	6
Labour	Pat Hayes*	22.70	847					
Fine Gael	Hilary Quinlan*	21.98	820					
Independent	Michael Duffy	14.77	551	573	593	617	629	659
Fianna Fáil	Sean Dower	13.32	497	521	524	537	541	762
Workers' Party	Davy Walsh*	13.21	493	521	547	567	669	709
Fianna Fáil	Larry Dower*	8.58	320	331	333	343	357	
Workers' Party	Jimmy Houlihan	3.67	137	147	158	164		
Green	Ben Nutty	1.77	66	71				
Electorate: 7,941 Valid: 3,731 (46.98%) Spoilt: 66 Quota: 747 Turnout: 3,797 (47.82%)

=== Waterford No.2 ===
Waterford No.2 - 5 seats
Party	Candidate	FPv%	Count							
Party	Candidate	FPv%	1	2	3	4	5	6	7	8
Independent	Davy Daniels*	31.45	1,523							
Fianna Fáil	Michael Ivory	10.76	521	657	660	668	688	709	744	784
Progressive Democrats	Oliver Clery	10.41	504	609	612	621	651	685	735	786
Fine Gael	Tom Cunningham*	10.12	490	584	586	594	676	780	829	
Fianna Fáil	Mary Roche	8.57	415	502	507	530	552	593	648	719
Green	Brendan McCann	5.68	275	334	353	395	409	446	504	636
Labour	Christine O'Dowd-Smith	5.39	261	302	315	352	359	387	406	
Independent	Seán Rohan	4.81	233	287	291	306	316	331		
Fine Gael	Mary Darlington	4.54	220	270	275	282	313			
Fine Gael	John Carey	3.49	169	224	232	239				
Workers' Party	Olga Redmond-Stokes	2.85	138	155	186					
Socialist Workers	Carolann Duggan	1.92	93	110						
Electorate: 11,302 Valid: 4,842 (42.84%) Spoilt: 50 Quota: 808 Turnout: 4,892 (43.28%)

=== Waterford No.3 ===
Waterford No.3 - 6 seats
Party	Candidate	FPv%	Count							
Party	Candidate	FPv%	1	2	3	4	5	6	7	8
Workers' Party	Martin O'Regan*	18.96	884							
Fine Gael	Maurice Cummins*	16.62	775							
Fianna Fáil	Tom Murphy	12.42	579	605	616	633	644	651	672	
Labour	Seamus Ryan	11.52	537	558	570	585	600	616	689	
Workers' Party	John Halligan	9.18	428	496	507	514	542	642	677	
Fianna Fáil	Chuck O'Connell	7.44	347	354	359	373	380	389	404	458
Independent	Laurence (Cha) O'Neill	7.40	345	357	370	381	400	409	424	502
Fine Gael	Michelle O'Neill	5.02	234	244	277	283	287	301	325	
Labour	Sue Larkin	3.41	159	170	177	198	214	231		
Socialist Workers	James Kelly	2.85	133	144	148	151				
Workers' Party	Billy McCarthy	2.79	130	175	180	187	213			
Green	Catherine Kinsella	2.38	111	117	124					
Electorate: 10,799 Valid: 4,662 (43.17%) Spoilt: 100 Quota: 667 Turnout: 4,762 (44.10%)
