= 2000 Tipperary South by-election =

By-election to the 28th Dáil

- 22 June 2000
- Turnout: 30,576 (58.0%)
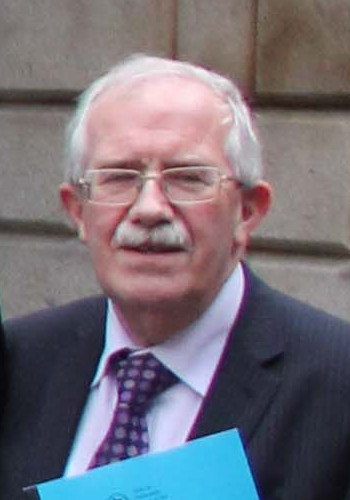
		Hayes	O'Brien
Nominee	Séamus Healy	Tom Hayes	Barry O'Brien
Party	Independent	Fine Gael	Fianna Fáil
First preferences	9,419	8,184	6,959
Percentage	30.8%	26.8%	22.8%
Final count	13,982	13,449	–
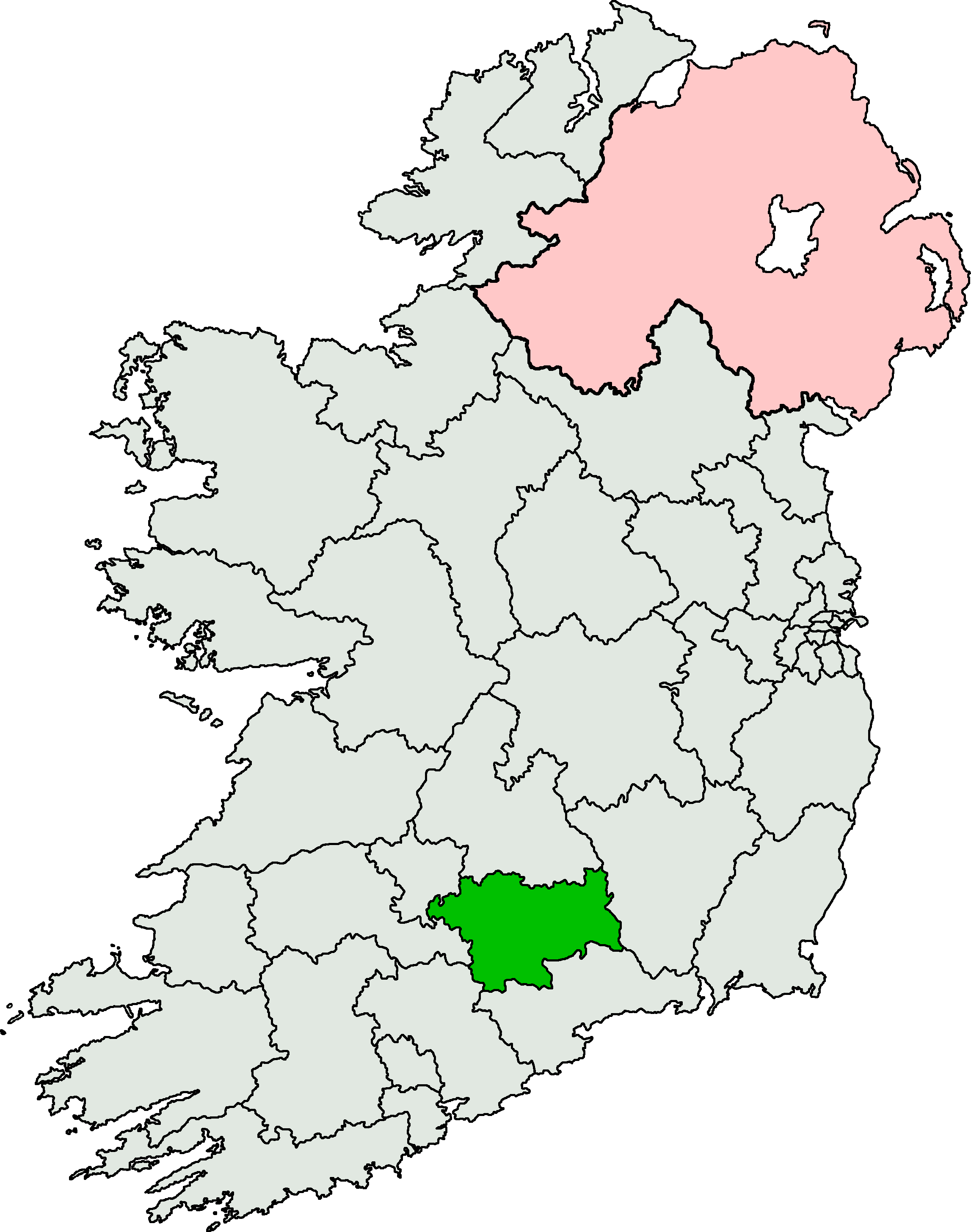
- Tipperary South shown within Ireland
TD before election
Michael Ferris
Labour
TD after election
Séamus Healy
Independent

A Dáil by-election was held in the constituency of Tipperary South in Ireland on Thursday, 22 June 2000, to fill a vacancy in the 28th Dáil. It followed the death of Labour Teachta Dála (TD) Michael Ferris on 20 March 2000.

The writ of election to fill the vacancy was agreed by the Dáil on 31 May 2000.

The by-election was won by the independent candidate Séamus Healy, elected as part of Workers and Unemployed Action.

The other candidates were senator Tom Hayes standing For Fine Gael who would win the 2001 Tipperary South by-election, Barry O'Brien for Fianna Fáil and Ellen Ferris for the Labour Party who was Michael Ferris's widow, Mary Heaney for Christian Solidarity and Raymond McInerney for Natural Law.

== Result ==
2000 Tipperary South by-election
Party	Candidate	FPv%	Count		
Party	Candidate	FPv%	1	2	3
Independent	Séamus Healy	30.8	9,419	11,169	13,982
Fine Gael	Tom Hayes	26.8	8,184	10,718	13,449
Fianna Fáil	Barry O'Brien	22.8	6,959	8,056	
Labour	Ellen Ferris	16.8	5,133		
Christian Solidarity	Mary Heaney	2.6	784		
Natural Law	Raymond McInerney	0.3	97		
Electorate: 52,740 Valid: 30,576 Quota: 15,289 Turnout: 58.0%
