= Phil Prendergast =

Irish former politician (born 1959)

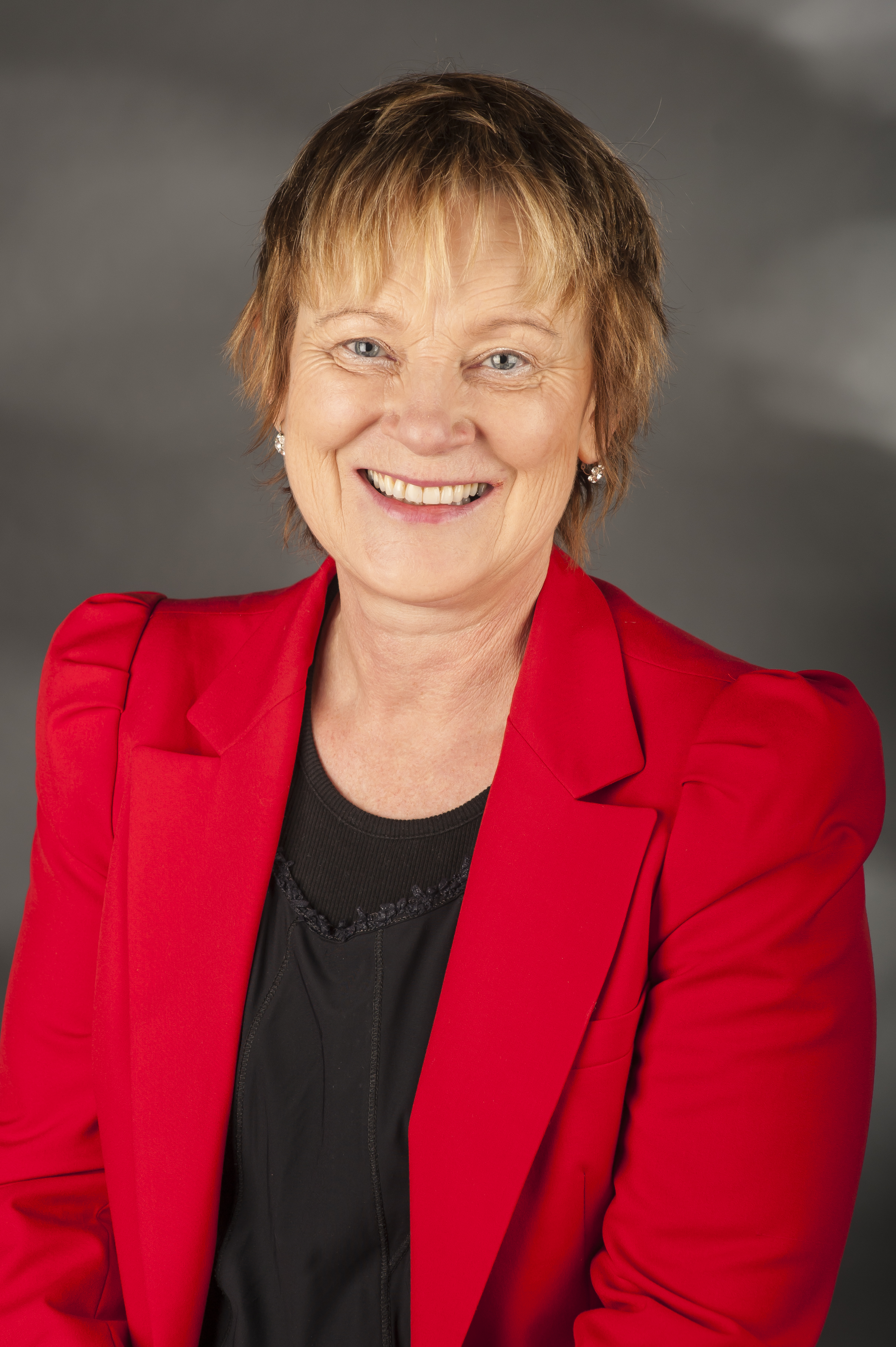
- Prendergast in 2014

Member of the European Parliament
- In office 1 April 2011 – 16 May 2014
- Constituency: South

Leader of the Labour Party in the Seanad
- In office 8 March 2011 – 25 May 2011
- Leader: Eamon Gilmore
- Preceded by: Alex White
- Succeeded by: Ivana Bacik

Senator
- In office 13 September 2007 – 1 April 2011
- Constituency: Labour Panel

Personal details
- Born: Philomena Foley; 20 September 1959 (age 66) Kilkenny, Ireland
- Party: Labour Party
- Spouse: Ray Prendergast (m. 1996)
- Children: 2
- Education: University College Cork

Phil Prendergast (née Foley; born 20 September 1959) is an Irish former Labour Party politician who served as a Member of the European Parliament (MEP) for the South constituency from 2011 to 2014, Leader of the Labour Party in the Seanad in 2011 and a Senator for the Labour Panel from 2007 to 2011.

== Early and private life ==
Phil Foley was born in County Kilkenny. She was a midwife at South Tipperary General Hospital for more than 20 years, having trained in Waterford Regional Hospital. She is married to Ray Prendergast, a psychiatric nurse, and has two children.

She is a former local branch officer with the Irish Nurses and Midwives Organisation, on the executive board of which she served in 1994.

== Political career ==
=== Local ===
Prendergast served on Clonmel Borough Council and South Tipperary County Council from 1999 to 2007, where she was elected originally as a member of the Workers and Unemployed Action Group (WUAG).

=== National ===
She first contested an election to Dáil Éireann in June 2001, when she stood on behalf of the WUAG in the Tipperary South by-election that followed the death of Theresa Ahearn; she polled 7,897 first preference votes. In June 2005, she left the WUAG to join the Labour Party. She was a Labour candidate at the 2007 general election in the Tipperary South constituency; she was unsuccessful, but was subsequently elected to the Seanad by the Labour Panel.

She caused some controversy within the local Labour Party branch when she tried to nominate a family member to replace her on the council.

Previously a Labour spokesperson on the Older Person, Prendergast served in the Seanad as a spokesperson on Health, Art and Sports, and Social and Family Affairs. She unsuccessfully contested the 2011 general election in Tipperary South, receiving almost 11.0% of the first preference votes.

=== European ===
In April 2011 she was selected as the replacement for MEP Alan Kelly, who was elected to Dáil Éireann at the 2011 election for Tipperary North. She sat on the Committee on the Internal Market and Consumer Protection, and on the Agriculture and Rural Development Committee. As a Member of the European Parliament, Prendergast spoke 127 times in plenary session and worked on the amendation of 32 reports.

She was involved in a controversy with the Labour Party leadership when she became the first member of the parliamentary party to call for the resignation of Health Minister James Reilly, following the announcement of the location of primary care health centres in the minister's own constituency.

She lost her seat at the 2014 European Parliament election.
