= 1999 Irish local elections =

Nationwide local authority elections

- 11 June 1999

1,627 County, City, Borough and Town Council Seats
- Turnout: 50.19% ▼5.46pp
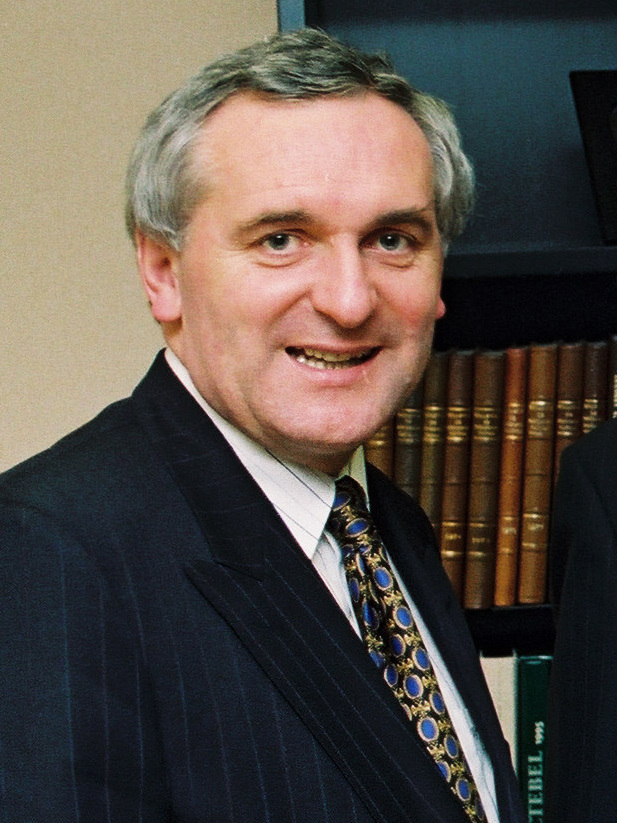

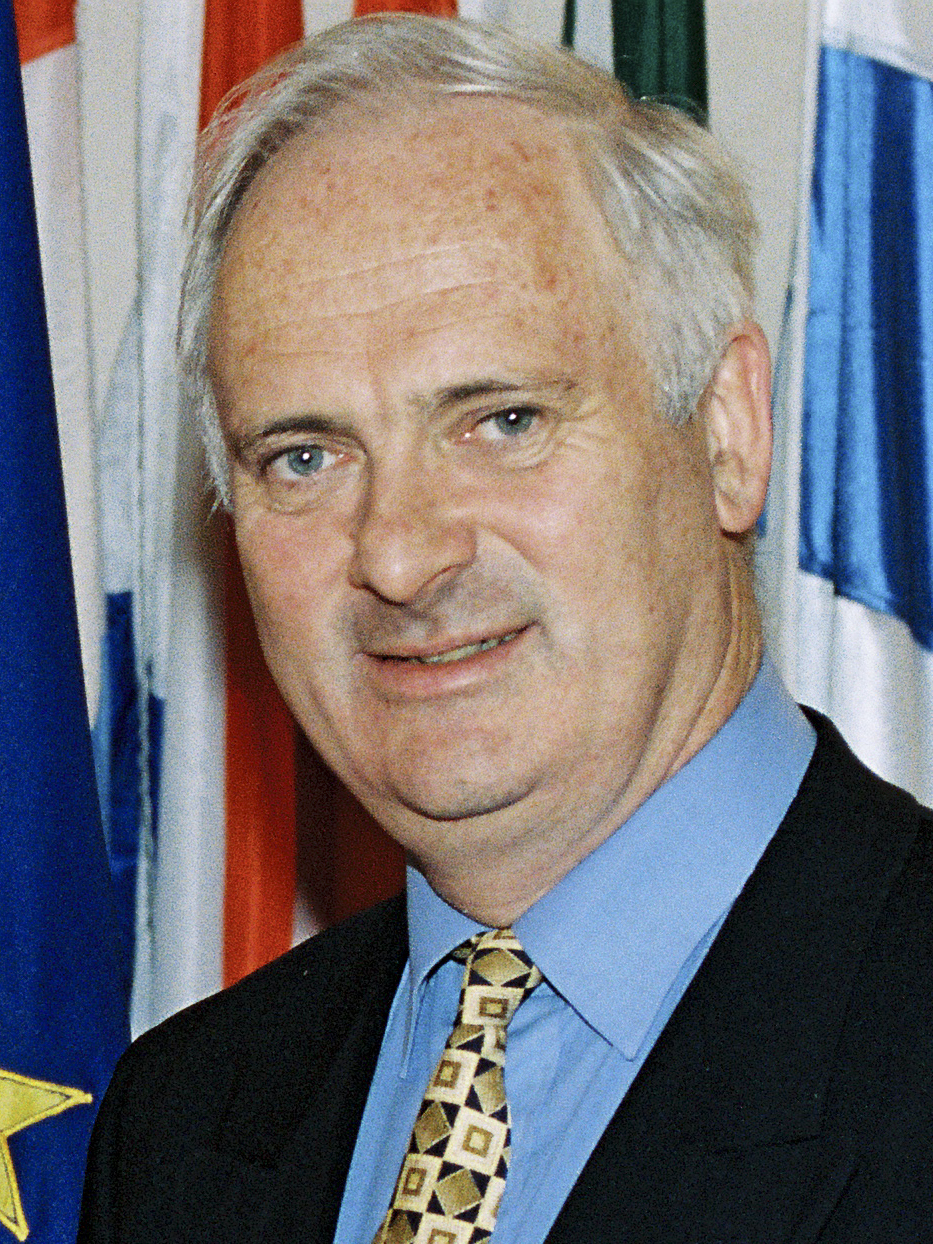

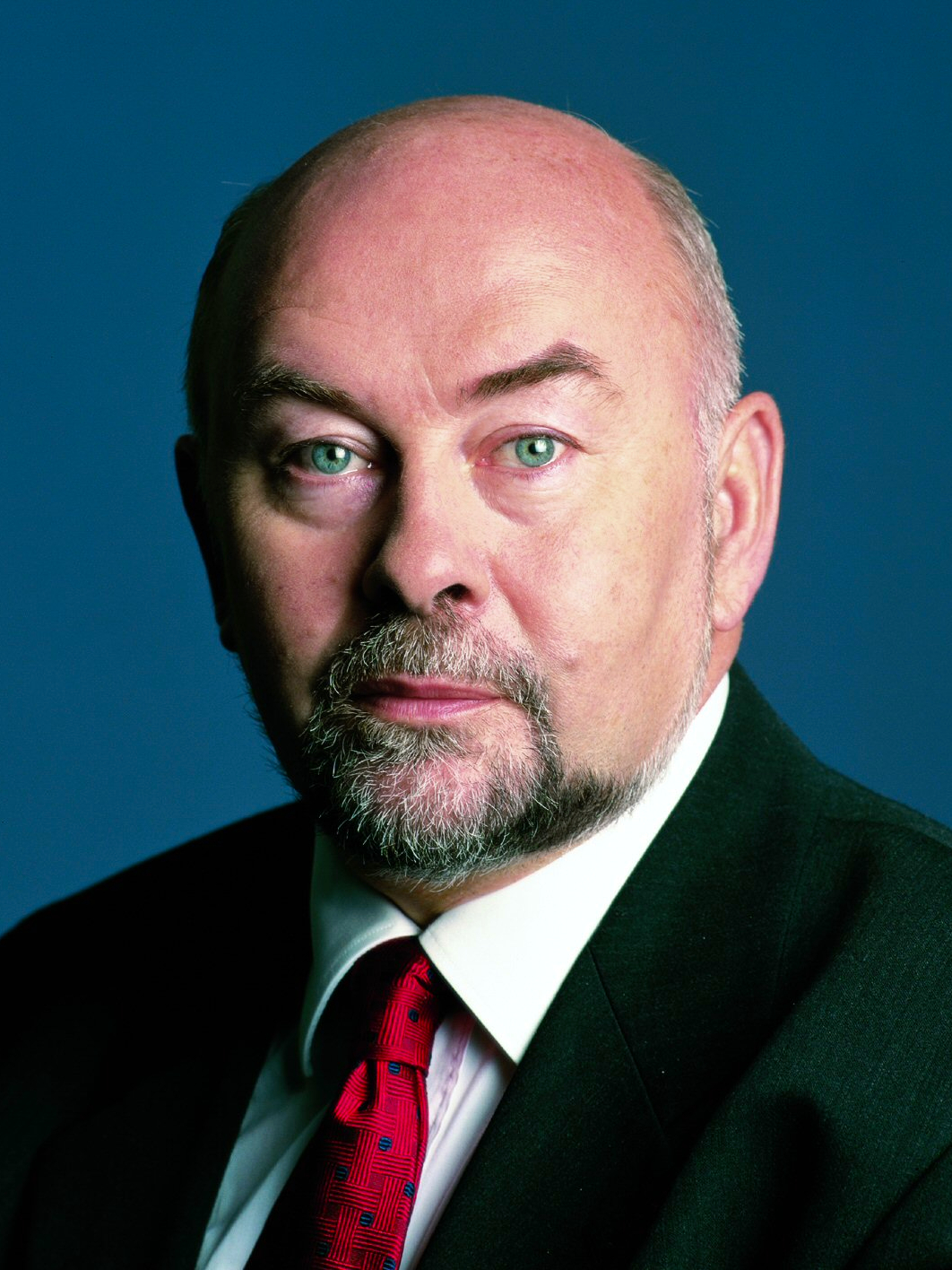

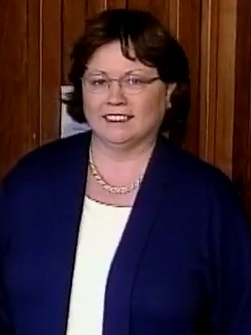

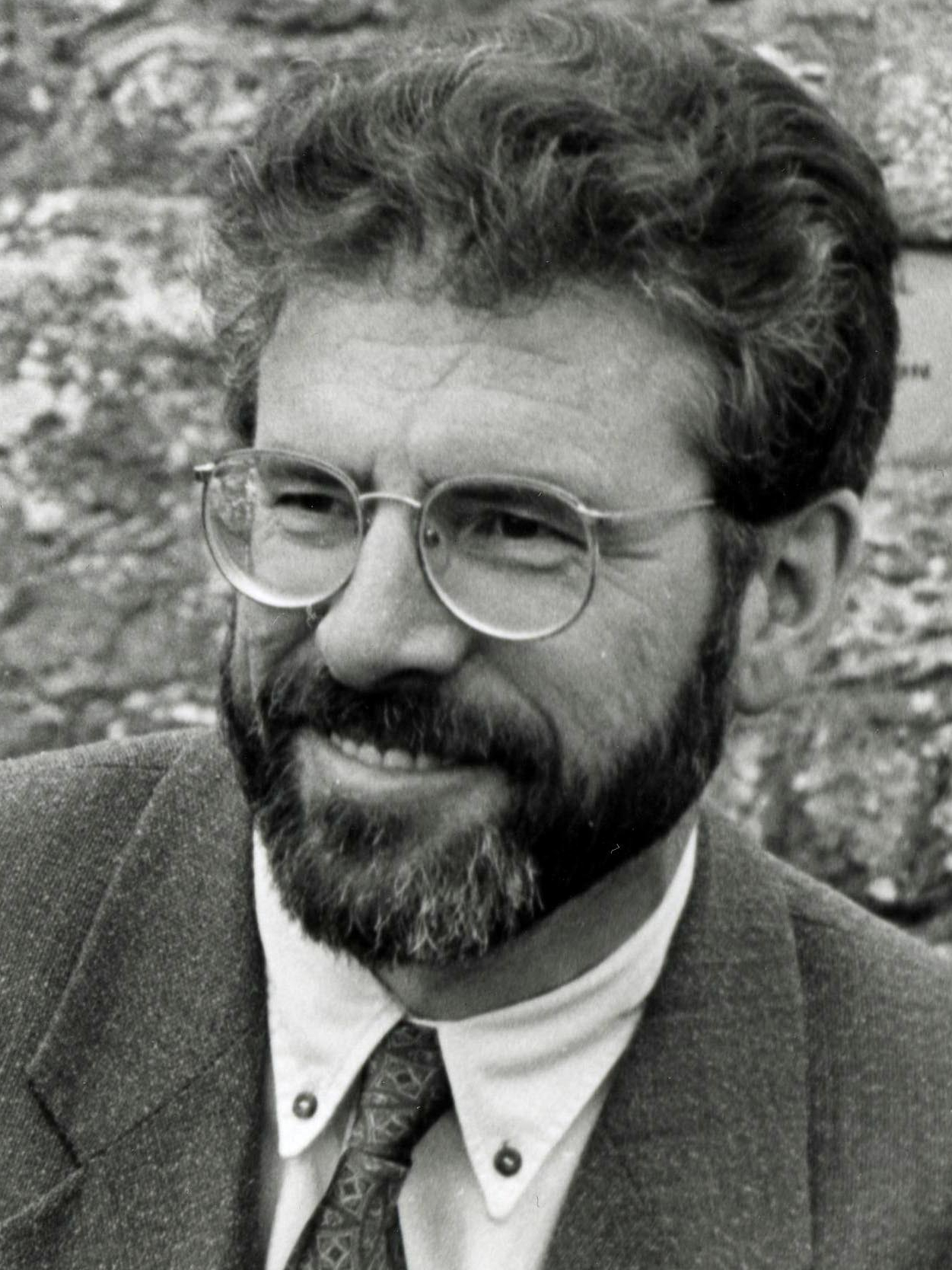
	First party	Second party	Third party
Leader	Bertie Ahern	John Bruton	Ruairi Quinn
Party	Fianna Fáil	Fine Gael	Labour
Leader since	19 November 1994	21 November 1990	13 November 1997
Percentage	38.9%	28.1%	10.8%
Councillors	382	277	83
Councillors +/-	▲28	▲3	▼6
	Fourth party	Fifth party	Sixth party
			GP
Leader	Mary Harney	Gerry Adams	None
Party	Progressive Democrats	Sinn Féin	Green
Leader since	26 October 1993	13 November 1983
Percentage	3.9%	3.5%	2.5%
Councillors	25	21	8
Councillors +/-	▼12	▲13	▼5

The 1999 Irish local elections were held in all the counties, cities and towns of Ireland on Friday, 11 June 1999, on the same day as the European elections and a referendum to recognise local government in the Constitution.

Ireland was divided into two tiers of local government areas: in the first tier of administrative counties and county boroughs, the local authorities had last been elected at the 1991 local elections; in the second tier in certain areas of boroughs, urban districts and towns, the local authorities had last been elected at the 1994 local elections. The elections for all local authorities had been scheduled for 1998, but were postponed.

Each local government area was divided into local electoral areas (LEAs) in which councillors were elected for a five-year term on the electoral system of proportional representation by means of the single transferable vote (PR-STV). During the period of office of these councils, local government throughout the state was restructured under the Local Government Act 2001.

== Results ==
Party	Seats	±	1st pref	FPv%	±%
Fianna Fáil	382	▲28	552,033	38.9	▲0.9
Fine Gael	277	▲3	399,125	28.1	▲1.5
Labour	83	▼6	153,197	10.8	▲0.3
Progressive Democrats	25	▼12	41,362	2.9	▼2.1
Sinn Féin	21	▲13	49,192	3.5	▲1.4
Green	8	▼5	35,742	2.5	▲0.1
Independent Fianna Fáil	4	Steady	7,087	0.5	▼0.4
Workers' Party	3	▼21	6,847	0.5	▼3.1
Socialist Party	2	New	5,312	0.4	New
SKIA	1	New	1,478	0.1	New
Republican Sinn Féin	1	Steady	1,390	0.1	▼0.2
Christian Solidarity	0	New	1,252	0.1	New
Socialist Workers	0	New	904	0.1	New
National Party	0	New	881	0.1	New
Natural Law Party	0	New	129	0.0	New
Independent	76	▼2	164,552	11.6	▲1.0
Total	883	Steady	1,420,483	100	—

In 1992, 18 Workers' Party councillors had left the party upon the creation of Democratic Left. In January 1999, Democratic Left merged with the Labour Party. One Workers' Party councillor had joined Labour since 1991.

=== County councils ===
Authority	FF	FG	Lab	GP	SF	PD	Other	Total	Details
Carlow	9	7	3	1		1		21	Details
Cavan	13	9			2		1	25	Details
Clare	18	9				1	4	32	Details
Cork	19	21	4			1	3	48	Details
Donegal	14	8	1				6	29	Details
Dún Laoghaire–Rathdown	10	8	6	1		3		28	Details
Fingal	6	5	6	1		1	5	24	Details
Galway	16	9				2	3	30	Details
Kerry	12	6	3		1		5	27	Details
Kildare	9	5	5			2	4	25	Details
Kilkenny	12	11	1				2	26	Details
Laois	14	10					1	25	Details
Leitrim	10	8			2		2	22	Details
Limerick	14	10				3	1	28	Details
Longford	8	10				1	2	21	Details
Louth	14	7	1		1		3	26	Details
Mayo	16	13	1				1	31	Details
Meath	14	11			1		3	29	Details
Monaghan	8	6			6			20	Details
Offaly	9	7	1				4	21	Details
Roscommon	9	12				1	4	26	Details
Sligo	9	11	2		1		2	25	Details
South Dublin	8	3	7	1	2	2	3	26	Details
North Tipperary	12	5	1				3	21	Details
South Tipperary	12	9	1				4	26	Details
Waterford	11	8	3				1	23	Details
Westmeath	12	6	5					23	Details
Wexford	9	8	1				3	21	Details
Wicklow	8	6	5	1			4	24	Details

=== City councils ===
Authority	FF	FG	Lab	GP	SF	PD	Other	Total	Details
Cork City	12	8	5	1	1	2	2	31	Details
Dublin City	20	9	14	2	4	0	3	52	Details
Galway City	5	4	2	0	0	4	0	15	Details
Limerick City	6	5	3	0	0	0	3	17	Details
Waterford City	4	3	2	0	0	1	5	15	Details

=== Borough and town councils ===
Party	Seats	±
Fianna Fáil	289	+16
Fine Gael	159	-15
Labour	87	+10
Sinn Féin	41	+16
Progressive Democrats	7	-11
Green	5	-1
Workers' Party	1	-1
Democratic Left	0	-11
Other parties	156	-3

==== Borough councils ====
Authority	FF	FG	Lab	SF	PDs	GP	WP	Others
Clonmel	5	2						5 (Note: The Workers and Unemployed Action Group has 2 County Councillors in South Tipperary and 5 Borough Councillors in Clonmel.)
Drogheda	5	1	3					3
Kilkenny	5	4	3					
Sligo	4	3	2	3				
Wexford	3	2	3	1				3
Totals	22	12	11	4	0	0	0	11

==== Town councils ====
Town	Fianna Fáil	Fine Gael	Labour Party	Sinn Féin	Progressive Democrats	Green Party	Workers Party of Ireland	Others	Total
Ardee	3	2	2	1	1				9
Arklow	4		1					4	9
Athlone	5	2						2	9
Athy	4	1	2	1				1	9
Balbriggan	2	1	2			1		3	9
Ballina	4	2						3	9
Ballinasloe	3	2						4	9
Ballybay	4	3		1				1	9
Ballyshannon	3	3						3	9
Bandon	4	3						2	9
Bantry	4	3		1				1	9
Belturbet	5	2		1				1	9
Birr	3	3	1					2	9
Boyle	2	2	2					3	9
Bray	5	1	4					2	12
Buncrana	3	3		1				2	9
Bundoran	5	2		1				1	9
Carlow	3	3	2		1				9
Carrickmacross	5	2		1				1	9
Carrick-on-Suir	3	1	2	1				2	9
Cashel	3	2	1					3	9
Castlebar	4	2	2					1	9
Castleblayney	3			2				4	9
Cavan	5	3		1					9
Clonakilty	3	2	1	1				2	9
Clones	3	2		3				2	9
Cobh	3	1	2	1				2	9
Cootehill	3	2		2				2	9
Dundalk	5	1		2	1			3	12
Dungarvan	1	2	4					2	9
Edenderry	4	1						4	9
Ennis	3	2	1			1		2	9
Enniscorthy	4	2		1				2	9
Fermoy	3	2	1					3	9
Gorey	5	3		1					9
Granard	3	2	1					3	9
Greystones	2	2	1					4	9
Kells	5	2	1					1	9
Kilkee	4	3						1	9
Killarney	3	1	1					4 (Note: Michael Gleeson of the South Kerry Independent Alliance is included in this total.)	9
Kilrush	4		1			1		3	9
Kinsale	4	2	1					2	9
Leixlip	4	2	3						9
Letterkenny	3	1	1					4	9
Lismore	2	3	2					2	9
Listowel	4	4		1					9
Longford	3	3			1			2	9
Loughrea	5	3						1	9
Macroom	3	4	1					1	9
Mallow	3	3	3						9
Midleton	3	2						4	9
Monaghan	3	1		4				1	9
Mountmellick	6	1						2	9
Muine Bheag	6	2	1						9
Mullingar	3	1	4					1	9
Naas	2	1	1		1			4	9
Navan	4	2		1				2	9
Nenagh	5	2	1					1	9
Newbridge	5	2						2	9
New Ross	5	1	1	1				1	9
Passage West	3	3	1	1		1			9
Portlaoise	5	2		1				1	9
Shannon	3	2	2					2	9
Skibbereen	2	2	2					3	9
Templemore	4	3						2	9
Thurles	4	2	2					1	9
Tipperary	2	2	2					3	9
Tralee	4	1	3	2				2	12
Tramore	3	1	1		1		1	2	9
Trim	3	1	1					4	9
Tuam	2	2	1		1			3	9
Tullamore	2	1	4	1				1	9
Westport	4	4						1	9
Wicklow	3	1	3					2	9
Youghal	4	1		1		1		2	9
