= Clonmel Courthouse =

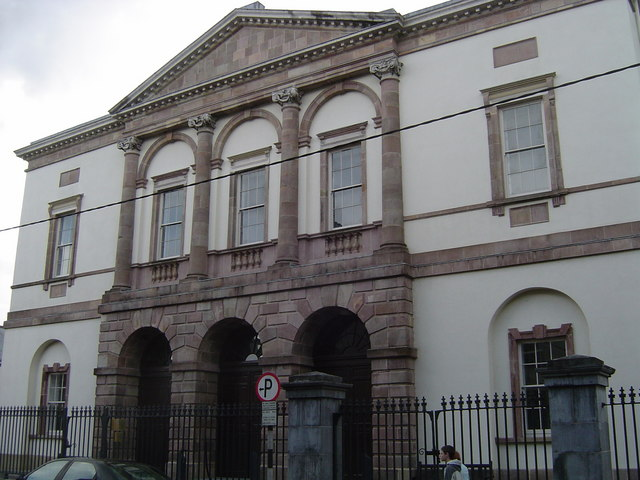
- Clonmel Courthouse

- Location within Ireland

General information
- Architectural style: Neoclassical style
- Location: Clonmel, County Tipperary, Ireland
- Coordinates: 52°21′11″N 7°41′54″W
- Completed: 1800

Design and construction
- Architect: Sir Richard Morrison

Clonmel Courthouse is a judicial facility in Clonmel, County Tipperary, Ireland.

== History ==
The courthouse, which was designed by Sir Richard Morrison in the neoclassical style and built in ashlar stone, was completed in 1800. The design involved a symmetrical main frontage with five bays facing onto Nelson Street; the central section of three bays, which slightly projected forward, featured a tetrastyle portico with rusticated archways on the ground floor and sash windows flanked by Ionic order columns on the first floor supporting an entablature and a modillioned pediment. Following the failed attempt at rebellion near Ballingarry in 1848, the captured leaders of the Young Irelanders were brought to Clonmel for trial.

The building was primarily used as a facility for dispensing justice but, following the implementation of the Local Government (Ireland) Act 1898, which established county councils in every county, the Grand Jury Room also became the meeting place for South Tipperary County Council. The county council moved to the Civic Offices in Emmet Street in 1927.
