= Civic Offices, Clonmel =

Municipal building in County Tipperary, Ireland

Coordinates: 52.3546°N 7.6997°W

The Civic Offices is a municipal facility on Emmet Road in Clonmel, County Tipperary, Ireland.

== History ==
The site currently occupied by the Civic Offices was the location of the county jail from the late 18th century. The current building, which was originally designed as a militia barracks, was completed in 1875. South Tipperary County Council, which had previously held its meetings in Clonmel Courthouse, moved into the premises in 1927. The county council initially referred to the facility as the "County Council Offices" but latterly referred to it as "County Hall". The building was subsequently extended eastwards along Emmet Road and the county library, on the opposite side of Emmet Road, was completed in 1987. Since 2014 it has been used as offices for Tipperary County Council.
