= Workers and Unemployed Action =

Irish political party

- Chairperson: Séamus Healy
- Founded: 1985
- Headquarters: 56 Queen Street, Clonmel, County Tipperary
- Ideology: Socialism; United Ireland
- Political position: Left-wing
- National affiliation: United Left Alliance (2010–2012)
- Local government: 1 / 949

Website
- wuag.wordpress.com

Workers and Unemployed Action (WUA) is an Irish political party based in Clonmel in South County Tipperary, set up in 1985 by Séamus Healy, who has been a Teachta Dála (TD) for Tipperary South intermittently since a 2000 by-election. The party has endorsed and seen a number of its members elected to the South Tipperary County Council, Tipperary County Council, and Clonmel Borough Council.

The organisation was set up in response to lack of employment and the economic situation in the South Tipperary area.

The party supports a progressive taxation system, full employment and Irish unity.

== History ==
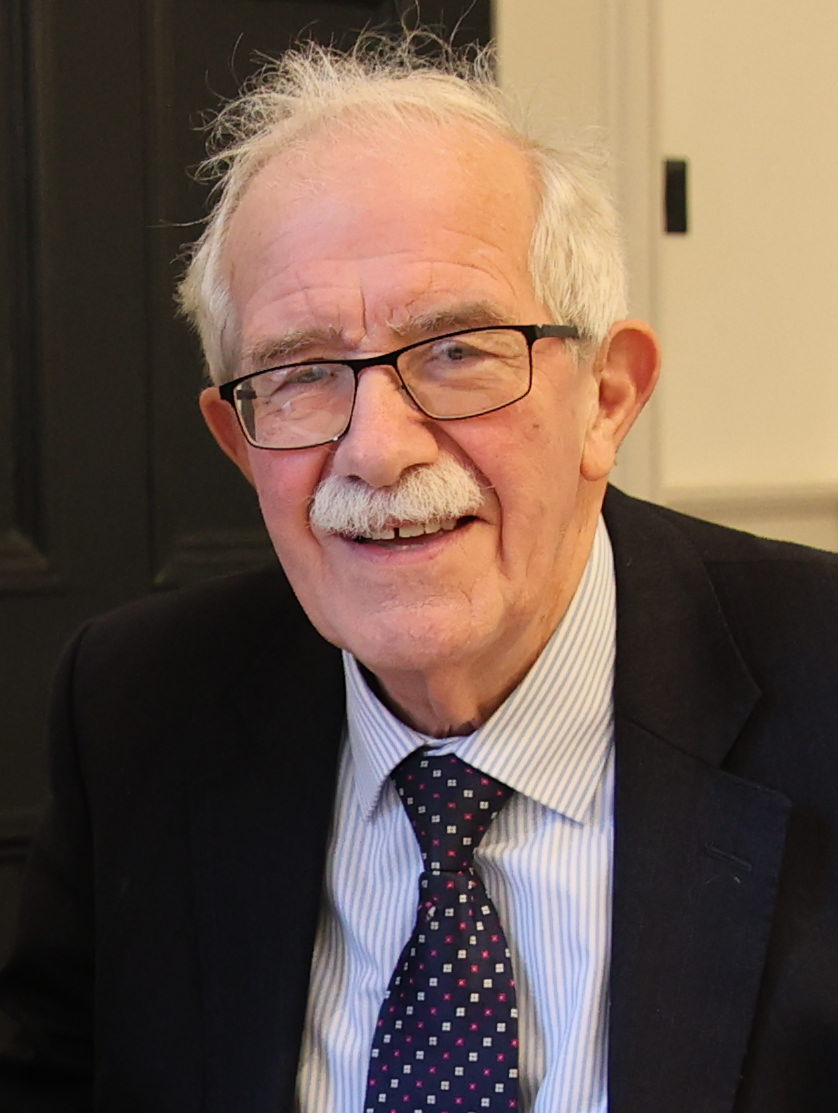
Party founder Séamus Healy in 2024

In the 2000 Tipperary South by-election, Séamus Healy was elected to the Dáil for Tipperary South, running as an independent candidate. At the 2002 general election, Healy was re-elected. Phil Prendergast was elected mayor of Clonmel in 2003.

In 2007, Prendergast left and joined the Labour Party after being headhunted to stand at the 2007 general election against Healy; neither were elected. However, Prendergast was elected to the 23rd Seanad on the Labour Panel.

The party was recognised by the Dáil registrar of political parties in September 2008. The party was involved in discussions with other left wing groups about a nationwide alliance at the 2009 local elections, which were not successful. At the 2009 local elections, Martin Henzey was returned on Carrick-on-Suir Town Council, while Séamus Healy, Pat English, Billy Shoer and Theresa Ryan were elected to Clonmel Borough Council. Healy and English were elected to South Tipperary County Council, for the Clonmel electoral area.

The party joined the United Left Alliance which was founded in November 2010, and fielded Séamus Healy in Tipperary South at the 2011 general election. Séamus Healy was the first deputy elected for South Tipperary at the 2011 general election. As a result of Healy's election to the 31st Dáil, Billy Shoer was co-opted to South Tipperary Country Council and Helena McGee was co-opted to Clonmel Borough Council.

In October 2012, WUA left the United Left Alliance following disagreements with the Socialist Party and People Before Profit Alliance over the tax affairs of Independent TD Mick Wallace.

Pat English was elected from the Clonmel local electoral area at the 2014 Tipperary County Council election held on 23 May 2014. He was re-elected at the 2024 Tipperary County Council election.

In 2015, it signed up to the Right2Change agreement.

In November 2017, the Standards in Public Office Commission stated that some statements of accounts had been received from the WUA, but they were found not to be compliant because the accounts were not audited. It decided against appointing a public auditor as the WUA did not receive any funding from the exchequer.

Healy contested the 2020 general election as an Independent candidate, rather than for WUA, losing his seat. Healy stood for the newly-created Tipperary South constituency as an independent candidate in the 2024 general election and was successful.
