= South Tipperary County Council =

Former local authority in Ireland (1898–2014)

South Tipperary County Council Comhairle Contae Thiobraid Árann Theas
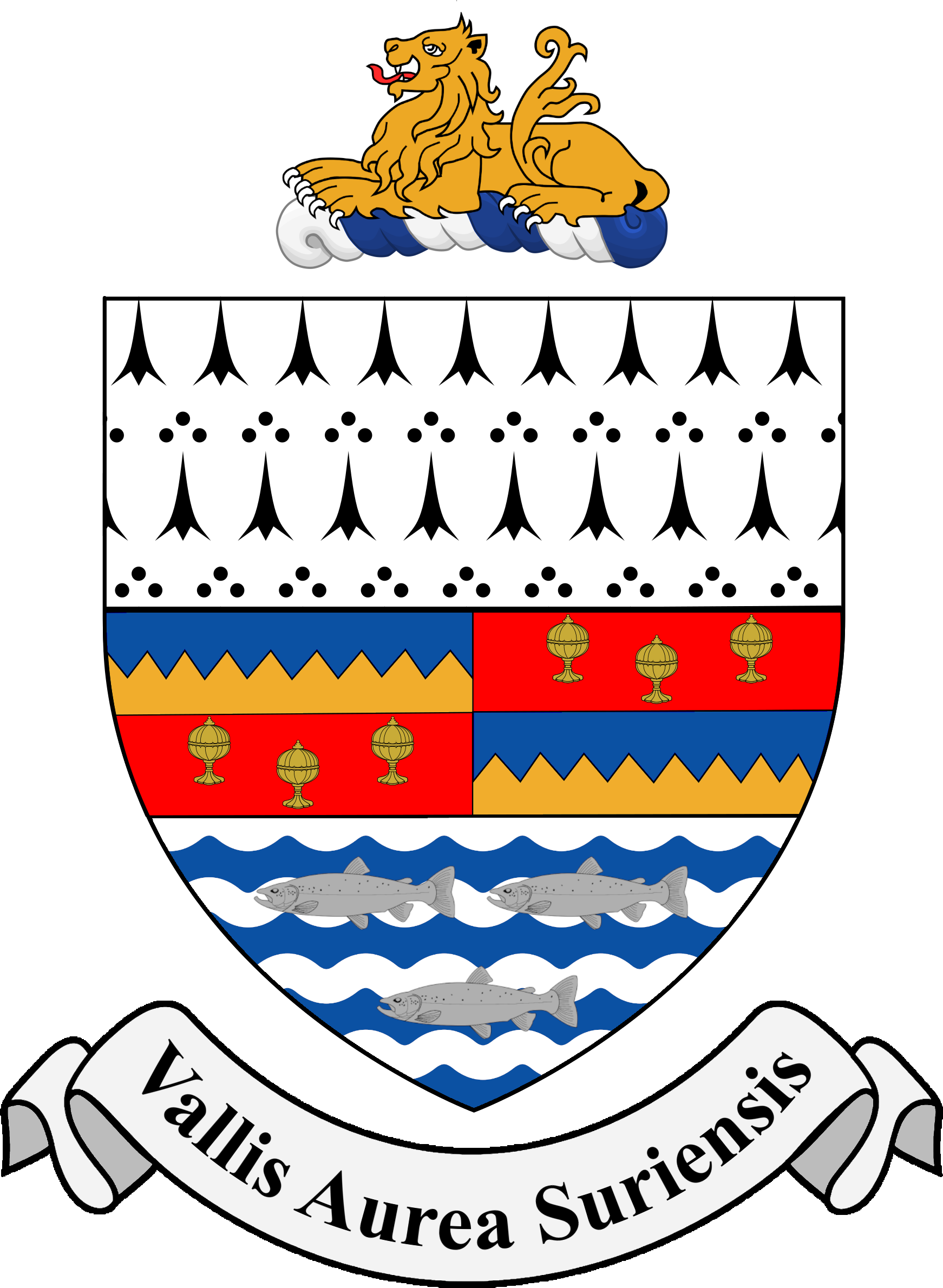

Type
- Type: County council

History
- Established: 1 April 1899
- Disbanded: 1 June 2014
- Preceded by: Grand Jury
- Succeeded by: Tipperary County Council
- Seats: 26

Elections
- Last election: 5 June 2009

Meeting place
- County Hall, Clonmel, Ireland

The area that was governed by the council

South Tipperary County Council (Irish: Comhairle Contae Thiobraid Árann Theas) was the authority responsible for local government in the county of South Tipperary, Ireland. The council had 26 elected members. The head of the council had the title of Cathaoirleach (chairperson). The county town was Clonmel.

== Establishment ==
South Tipperary County Council was established on 1 April 1899 under the Local Government (Ireland) Act 1898 for the administrative county of Tipperary, South Riding. It succeeded the judicial county of the South Riding of County Tipperary, with the addition of the district electoral divisions previously in the North Riding of Cappagh, Curraheen and Glengar, and the portions of the town of Carrick-on-Suir and the borough of Clonmel previously in County Waterford.

== Council meetings ==
Originally South Tipperary County Council held its meetings in Clonmel Courthouse. The county council moved to new facilities in Emmet Street, latterly known as the County Hall, in 1927.

== Elections ==
The Local Government (Ireland) Act 1919 introduced the electoral system of proportional representation by means of the single transferable vote (PR-STV) for the 1920 Irish local elections. Tipperary South Riding was divided into 5 county electoral areas to elect the 23 members of the council.

Under the Local Government Act 2001, South Tipperary County Council was allocated 26 seats. The 2009 South Tipperary County Council election was the last election to the council.

== Dissolution ==
On 26 July 2011, the Minister for the Environment, Community and Local Government, Phil Hogan, announced the proposed merger of North Tipperary County Council and South Tipperary County Council. Following implementation of the Local Government Reform Act 2014, it was dissolved on 1 June 2014, and succeeded by Tipperary County Council.
