= Kill, County Kildare =

Village in County Kildare, Ireland

Kill Irish: An Chill
- Village
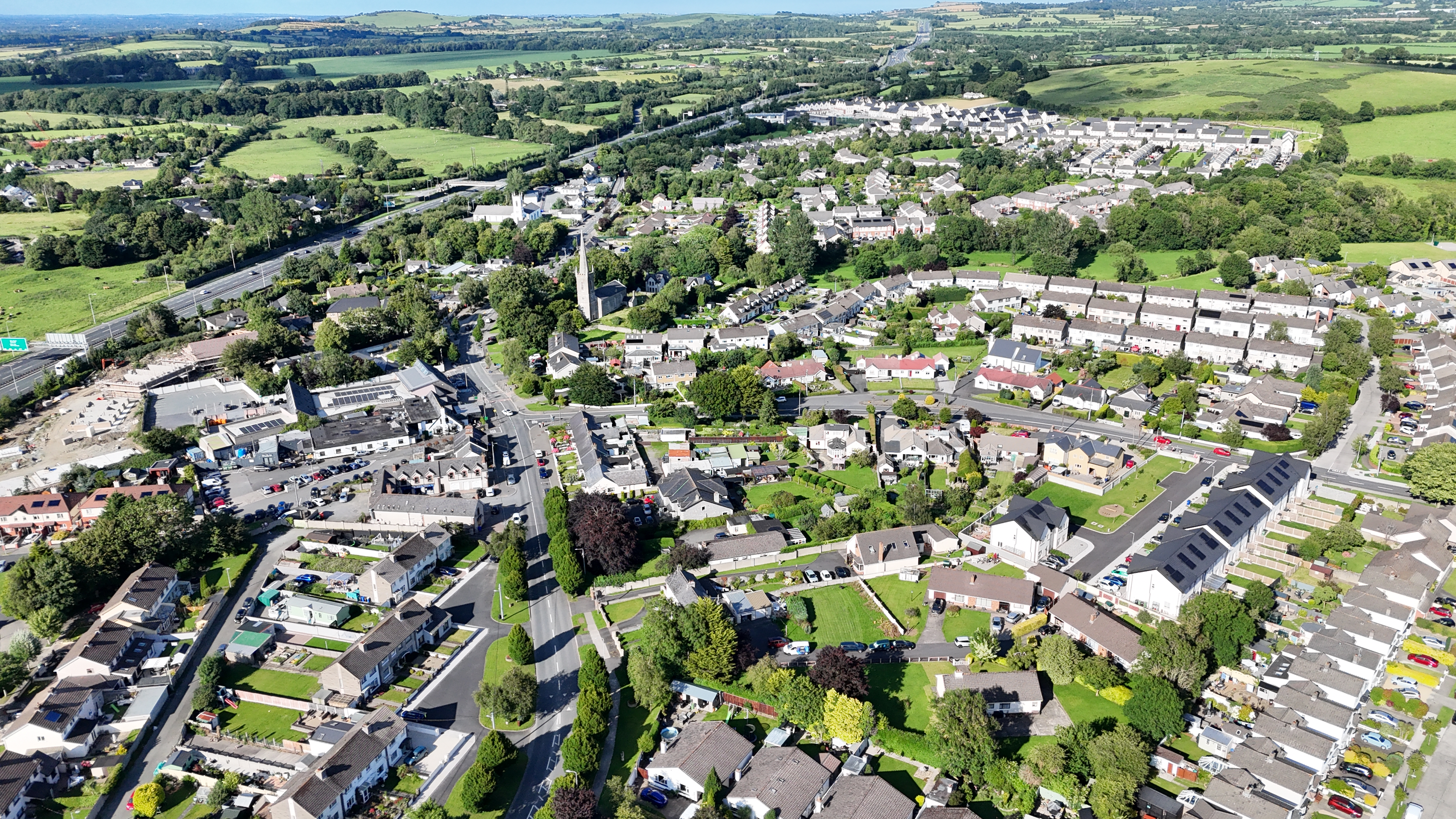
- Skyline of Kill

- Location in Ireland
- Coordinates: 53°14′59″N 6°35′19″W
- Country: Ireland
- Province: Leinster
- County: County Kildare
- Elevation: 61 m (200 ft)

Population (2022)
  - Total: 3,818
- Time zone: UTC+0 (WET)
  - Summer (DST): UTC-1 (IST (WEST))
- Irish Grid Reference: N939225

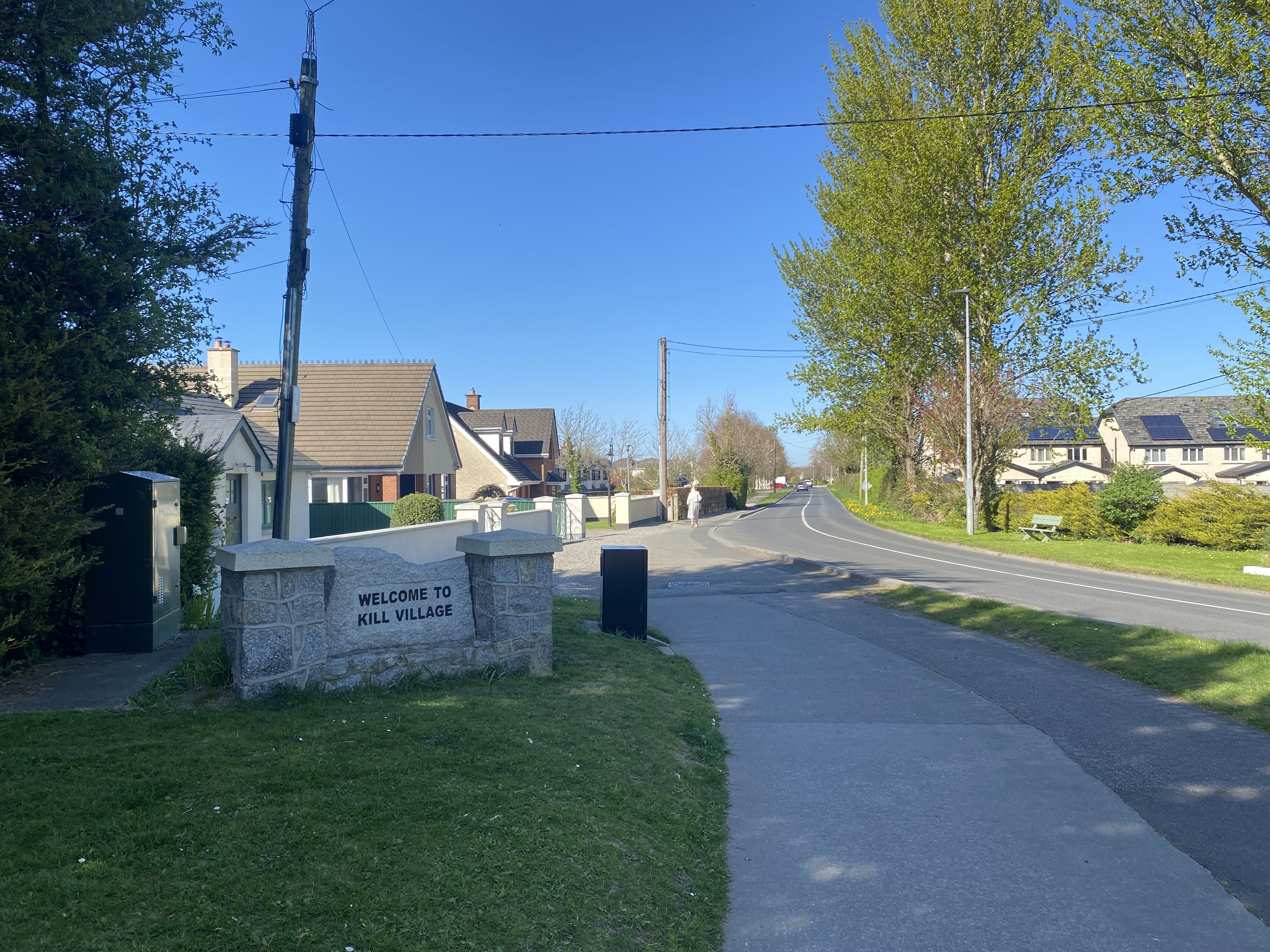
South entry of Kill

Kill (Irish: an Chill, meaning 'the church') is a village and parish in County Kildare, Ireland near the county's border with Dublin beside the N7. Its population was recorded as 3,818 people in the 2022 census.

Kill is the birthplace of the Fenian John Devoy as well as home to two holders of the most senior ministry in the Irish government, the most powerful family in the 18th century Irish House of Commons and the birthplace of a leader of the opposition in the British House of Commons. The village won the European Entente Florale horticultural competition in 1987.

== History ==
Excavations for the widening of the N7 in 2004 unearthed evidence of early habitation, including a late Bronze Age/early Iron Age hill fort and three small ring barrows. Kill (Cill Corbáin) was reputedly the burial place of the nine Ui Faeláin kings (later to become the O’Byrnes) who were based at Naas (Nás na Ríogh), the last of whom, Cerball mac Muirecáin, was buried in 909. The 'motte' of John de Hereford's castle, probably dating from the 12th century, still survives on the outskirts of the village. A commandery for Knights Hospitallers was founded at Kilhill in the 13th century, by Maurice Fitzgerald, and chapters of the order were held here in 1326, 1332–34; it existed until the Reformation, when it was granted to John Alan.

The Whiteboys were active in Kill parish in 1775. The stopping of the mail coach in Kill in 1798 incited rebellion in the county. Kill Hill was the name used for the town in 18th-century maps, which mark a commons which was enclosed by an act of parliament in 1811. During the Irish War of Independence, two Royal Irish Constabulary (RIC) men were shot dead at Greenhills on 21 August 1920. Broughal's pub was attacked by British forces, and the vacated RIC barracks were later burned down.

== Transport ==
Kill's prominence through its history stems from its situation on the main road from Dublin to the south and south-west. The village was a staging post on the old toll road to Kilcullen, the first turnpike to be built (1729). It was here that horses were changed on the three-hour mail coach journey from Dublin to Kilcullen. The Old House, a turnpike inn, was originally built in 1794 and then rebuilt in 1943. Traffic increased dramatically on the road, (designated the T5 in 1926 and the N7 in 1977) in the middle years of the 20th century (2,000 a day in 1948, 3,800 in 1954, 4,500 in 1956, and 6,900 in 1962). Proposals to bypass the village, first published in 1952, were contested by the population, but Kill was the first of the three villages on the Dublin-Naas road to be by-passed when a single carriageway road, 28 feet wide, through the fields of the Old Glebe House to the north of the town, was opened by Gerard Sweetman on 15 June 1956.

The road claimed its first casualty, Straffan resident Margaret Hanafin, even before its official opening on 1 June 1956, and four people died in the first major collision on the newly constructed bypass on 31 July. The Irish Times motoring correspondent described the road as:

"...the most modern piece of road engineering in the country. The criticism had been made that the bypass was crossed by a local road, running from Kill to Straffan, about which the only warning on the main road was one small sign".

The accident rate was a factor in the postponement of the entire Naas road scheme by the Fine Gael led coalition government in August 1956, leaving both the Johnstown and Rathcoole sections of the road in a semi-finished state until the re-election of a Fianna Fáil government.

The single carriageway by-pass was eventually replaced by a dual carriageway, opened by Neil Blaney on 25 June 1963, the first section of the Dublin-Naas road to be increased to four lanes. The local service station in Beaufort, owned by the Goosen family, became known for its "open 24½ hours daily" sign. This road was poorly designed with broadside crossings of insufficient length to accommodate even a small motor car. Kill's new dual carriageway claimed 18 lives in its first three years of operation to 1966 and a total of 57 lives in all. Even after traffic lights were installed at the Kill junction in November 1980, eleven more people died before a proper graded fly-over crossing was completed on 14 August 2006.

== Economy ==
Historical population
Year	Pop.	±%
1821	310	—
1831	626	+101.9%
1841	405	−35.3%
1851	361	−10.9%
1861	212	−41.3%
1871	215	+1.4%
1881	202	−6.0%
1891	152	−24.8%
1901	109	−28.3%
1911	90	−17.4%
1926	101	+12.2%
1936	95	−5.9%
1946	90	−5.3%
1951	127	+41.1%
1956	169	+33.1%
1961	186	+10.1%
1966	287	+54.3%
1971	480	+67.2%
1981	1,268	+164.2%
1986	1,503	+18.5%
1991	1,518	+1.0%
1996	1,711	+12.7%
2002	2,246	+31.3%
2006	2,510	+11.8%
2011	3,095	+23.3%
2016	3,348	+8.2%
2022	3,818	+14.0%

Rabbit Falls at Hartwell, Arthurstown, Thornberry and Brookstown were first quarried in 1945 when Tom Roche set up the Castle Sand Company, later to become Roadstone, and in turn CRH Holdings, to become Ireland's largest multinational corporation with a turnover of €17bn (2010). The local quarries and offices of the company were major employers until they closed in 1982.

The economic transformation of Kill over this 30-year period was described by Ardclough schoolteacher Brigid Maguire in an Irish Press article previewing the opening of Goff's Horse Sales auditorium in 1975:

"A decade or so ago the village of Kill, now by-passed by the dual carriageway from Naas to Dublin was small and insignificant. A few houses, a couple of pubs, two churches, a post office. An old low-ceilinged schoolhouse was dismally clamouring for demolition. Then, gravel was discovered and a company was formed. The Castle Sand Company, later to become Roadstone, sent dumpers and trucks along to ruffle the quiet of the village. Houses to hold workers and a new school were built, the chapel under the wing of the popular sagart pharóiste was built doubling its floor space. A posh hotel was built. Now, a further addition – a project to set up a new bloodstock sales emporium strikes the imagination as being the right thing in the right place".

By the late 1970s, Kill was becoming a commuter town to Dublin.

== Politics ==
Bishopscourt was home to John Ponsonby, speaker of the Irish House of Commons (1753–61), William Ponsonby, leader of the Irish Whigs (1789–1803) and birthplace of his brother George Ponsonby (1755–1817) leader of the Whig Party in the British House of Commons at Westminster (1808–17), his uncle Major-General Sir William Ponsonby (1772–1815) whose inept charge at the Battle of Waterloo resulted in his death at the hands of the Polish Lancers and was studied as an example of failed battle strategy for generations afterwards, and of his sister Mary Ponsonby, wife of Charles Grey, British Prime Minister from 1830 to 1834, best known as the Earl Grey of the tea brand. Lady Ponsonby was mentioned in the Saul Dibb film, The Duchess. Ponsonby descendants include Sir Alec Douglas-Home (British Prime Minister, 1963–64), Nicky Haslam, and Princess Diana.

Fenian leader John Devoy was born near Kill on 3 September 1842. Two Irish Ministers for Finance had local connections: Gerard Sweetman (Minister for Finance, 1954–57) lived in Killeen House and Charlie McCreevy, Irish Minister for Finance (1997–2004) and EU Commissioner for Internal Trade (2004-), attended the primary school in Kill. George Wolfe of nearby Forenaughts was a member of Dáil Éireann from 1923 to 1932. Patrick Malone, Fine Gael TD for Kildare (1970–77) lived in Brookstown House, a mile outside the village.

== Music ==
The village is the birthplace of the world-renowned Uilleann piper Liam O'Flynn and Heidi Talbot, a solo artist and the voice of Irish-American group Cherish the Ladies. The local "Kill Singers" choral group has had many successes in recent years in competitions in Ireland and overseas. The group practice in the local primary school on Wednesday evenings, except during the summer. Additionally, the local "Kill Musical and Dramatic Society" specialises in musical and theatrical performance. The society's productions are held at the local St. Brigid's Church, and notable recent productions have included the pantomime 'Entangled'.

== Churches ==
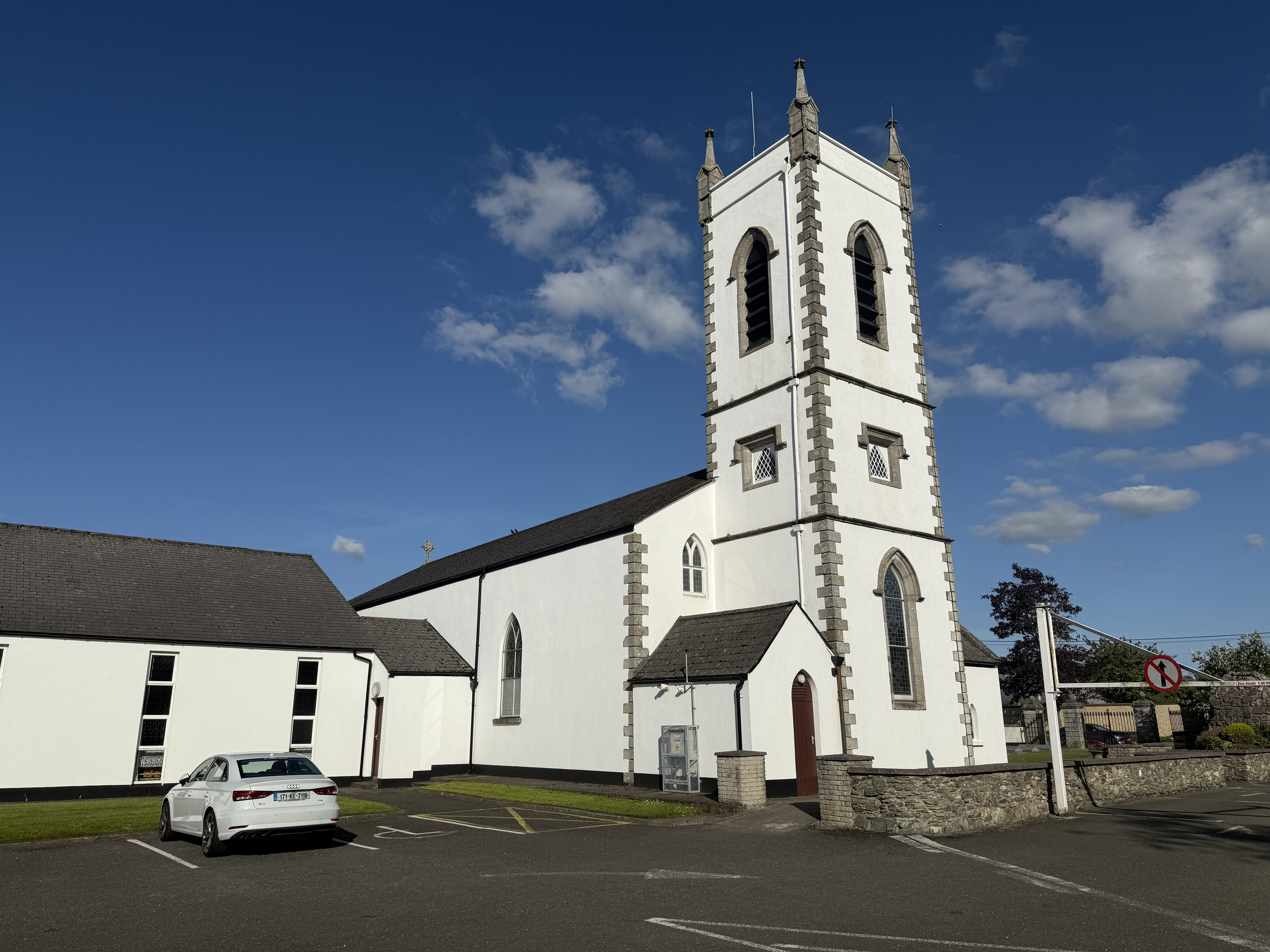
St. Brigid's Church

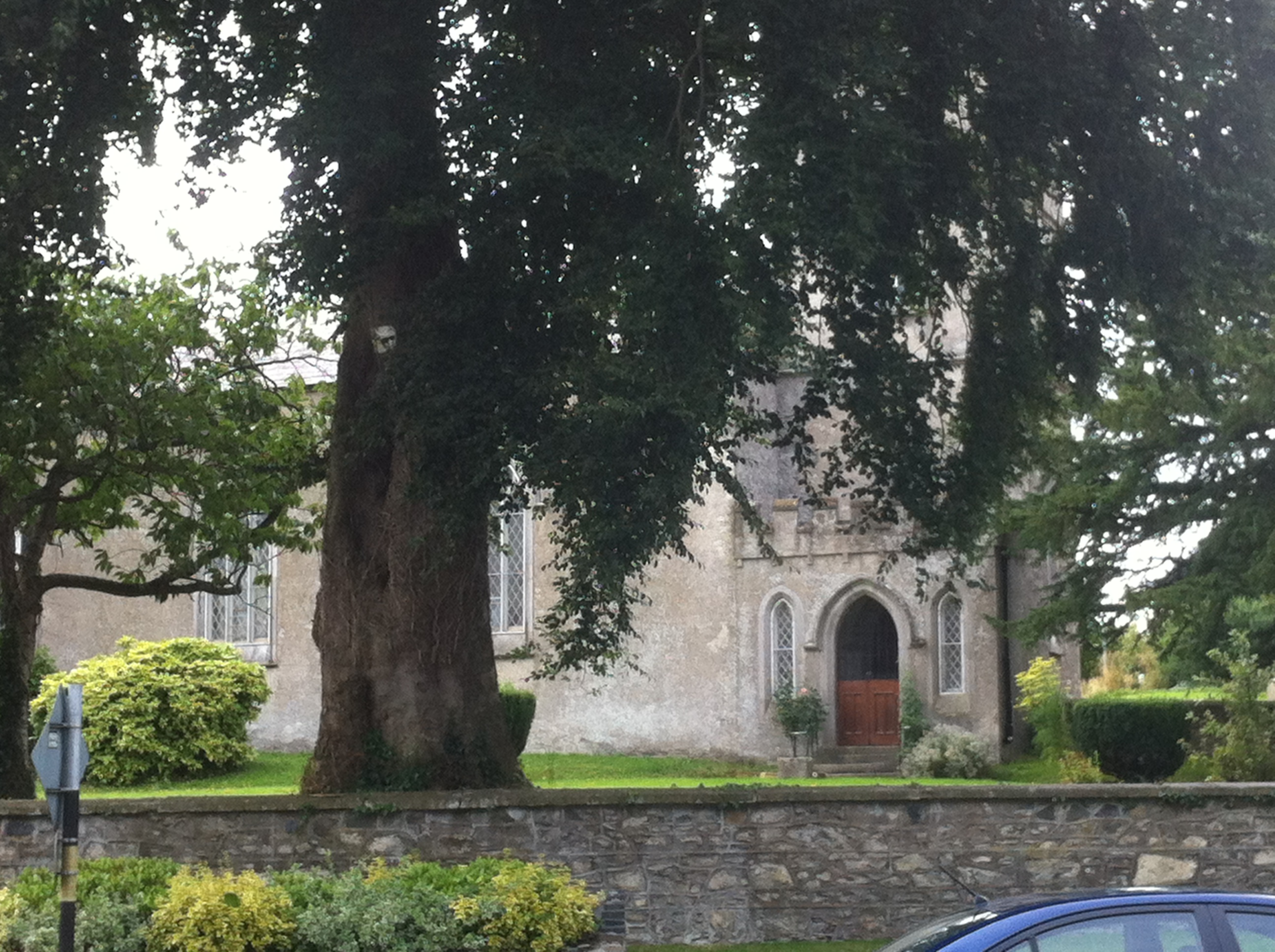
St. John's Church

The village has two churches; St Brigid's (Catholic) Church and St John's (Church of Ireland). The latter contains an unusual organ (normal colour of keys is reversed) donated by the Bourke (Earls of Mayo) family, who were the landlords based in Palmerstown House in the 18th and 19th centuries, and a rare "half door" at the entrance to the building, outside of which is an early stone font.

In the Catholic Church, the parish of Kill was united with that of nearby Lyons in 1693. The current Catholic church was built in 1821 and extended in 1973. The chapel bell in Kill was said to have been the first in Ireland to ring in celebration of Catholic emancipation in 1829.

St Brigid's Well in Hartwell (probably an earlier site of worship) was a place of pilgrimage until the 19th century and a sally tree covered with votive rags was recorded here in the 1890s. There are ruins of another 14th-century church in Kerdiffstown.

== Culture ==
Branches of Muintir na Tíre (1954) and Macra na Feirme (1955) were established in the village. There is a branch of the Irish Countrywomen's Association (ICA). The ICA's former national president, Patsy Lawlor, was from Kill. The Kill History Group meets locally to discuss topics of local interest.

== Sport ==
The Irish Masters in snooker was held in Kill, at Goff's sales ring, from 1979 to 2000.

Kill GAA reached the semi-finals of the Kildare SF championships in 1962. Kill player Kieran O'Malley was a member of the Kildare team that contested the 1958 National Football League final. Kill GAA club also won both Junior A and Junior B County football championships, the Jack Higgins Cup, and were awarded club of the year in 1992. A field now overrun by the N7 staged the 1939 Leinster camogie final.

Motorcyclist Ernie Lyons won the Senior Manx Grand Prix in 1946.

Rugby player Adam Byrne has represented Ireland at 7s and the 15s and has played for both Leinster and Connacht.

=== Equestrian ===
Ted Walsh, 11-time Irish amateur champion jockey and trainer of the Grand National winning horse Papillion 2001 and Irish national/triumph hurdle/Heineken gold cup winner Commanche Court has his stables on the outskirts of Kill. His son, Ruby Walsh, rode both horses and was Irish National Hunt champion in 2007. Jockey Brendan Sheridan attended Kill National School. Horse breeder Edward "Cub" Kennedy ran a stud farm in the 1920s at Bishopscourt.

Showjumper Iris Kellett won the Queen Elizabeth Cup (1949) and the Ladies European championship in 1969. Kill is home to Goffs Horse Sales Centre. Grand National winning horses Papillion and Commanche Court were trained in Kill by Ted Walsh. Captain Christy (winner Cheltenham Gold Cup, 1974), and Kicking King (winner Cheltenham Gold Cup, 2005) were trained in nearby Alasty by Pat Taaffe and his son Tom Taaffe, respectively.

== Notable people ==
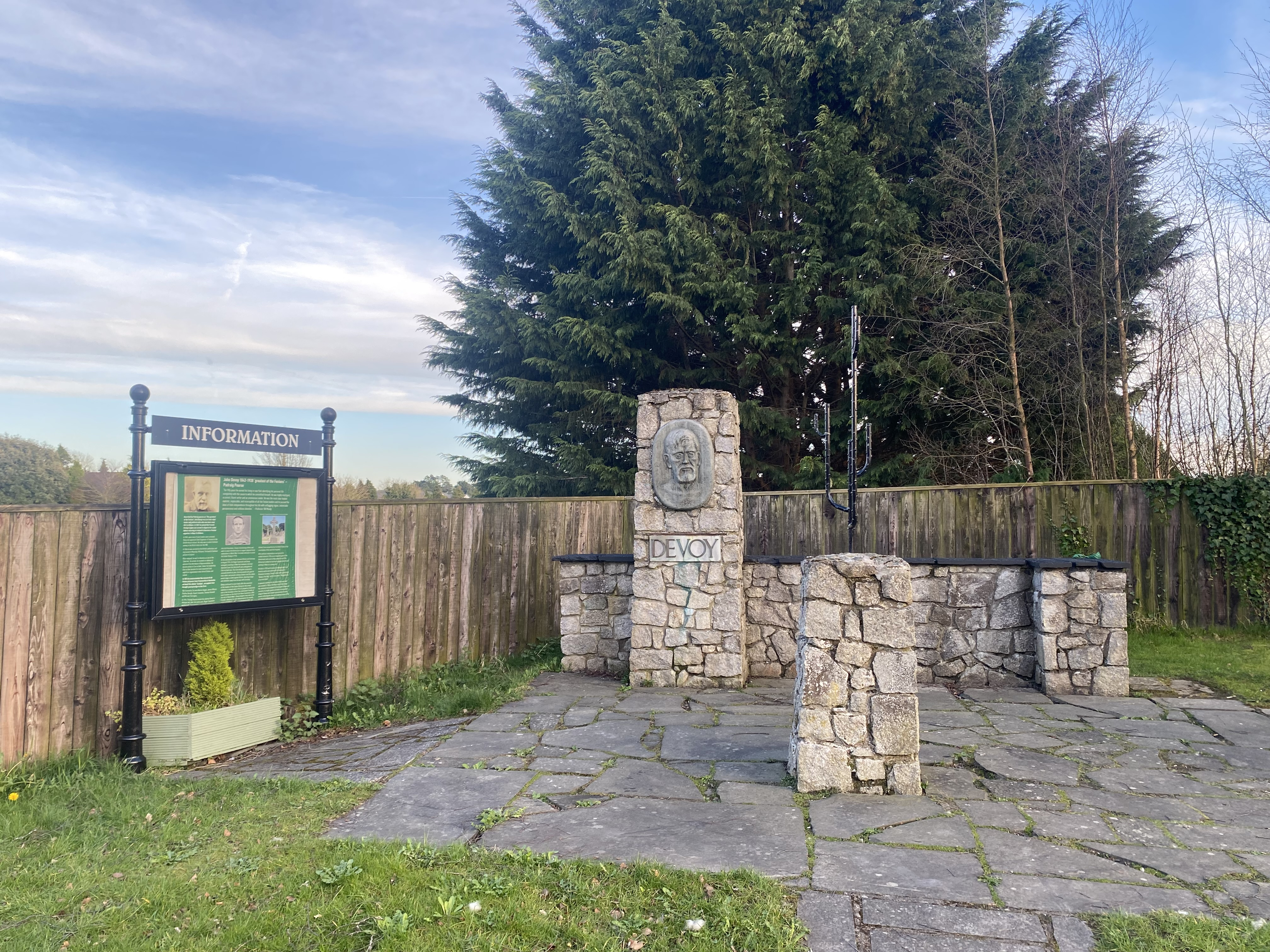
John Devoy Memorial at Kill

- Adam Byrne, former rugby player
- John Devoy, Irish republican rebel and journalist
- Patsy Lawlor, politician
- Philip Lawlor, former rugby player
- Ernie Lyons, motorcycle racer
- Emer McLysaght, journalist and author
- Liam O'Flynn, uilleann piper and Irish traditional musician.
- Heidi Talbot, musician
- James Tracy, former rugby player
- Katie Walsh, former jockey
- Lauren Walsh, golfer
- Ruby Walsh, former jockey

== See also ==
- Kildare
- List of towns and villages in the Republic of Ireland
