= 1964 Kildare by-election =

By-election to the 17th Dáil

- 19 February 1964
- Turnout: 31,944 (73.0%)
| | Boylan | Malone | Norton |
| Nominee | Terence Boylan | Patrick Malone | Patrick Norton |
| Party | Fianna Fáil | Fine Gael | Labour |
| First preferences | 13,905 | 9,825 | 8,214 |
| Percentage | 43.5% | 30.8% | 25.7% |
| Final count | 15,973 | 14,254 | – |
TD before election
William Norton
Labour
TD after election
Terence Boylan
Fianna Fáil

A Dáil by-election was held in the constituency of Kildare in Ireland on Wednesday, 19 February 1964, to fill a vacancy in the 17th Dáil. It followed the death of Labour Teachta Dála (TD) William Norton on 4 December 1963.

The writ of election to fill the vacancy was agreed by the Dáil on 29 January 1964.

The by-election was won by the Fianna Fáil candidate Terence Boylan. It was held on the same day as the 1964 Cork Borough by-election. Both by-elections were won by Fianna Fáil candidates.

The Labour candidate Patrick Norton, son of the deceased TD, was elected for Kildare at the 1965 general election.

== Result ==
1964 Kildare by-election
| Party | Candidate | FPv% | Count | |
| Party | Candidate | FPv% | 1 | 2 |
|---|---|---|---|---|
| Fianna Fáil | Terence Boylan | 43.5 | 13,905 | 15,973 |
| Fine Gael | Patrick Malone | 30.8 | 9,825 | 14,254 |
| Labour | Patrick Norton | 25.7 | 8,214 | |
Electorate: 43,779 Valid: 31,944 Quota: 15,973 Turnout: 73.0%
