= Patrick Norton =

Patrick Norton may refer to:

- Patrick Daniel Norton (1876–1953), US politician from North Dakota
- Patrick Norton (Irish politician) (born 1928), Irish Labour Party politician represented Kildare from 1965–1969
