= 1970 Kildare by-election =

By-election to the 19th Dáil

- 14 April 1970
- Turnout: 26,012 (71.7%)
	Malone	Kane	Bermingham
Nominee	Patrick Malone	Eamon Kane	Joseph Bermingham
Party	Fine Gael	Fianna Fáil	Labour
First preferences	9,335	10,754	5,923
Percentage	35.9%	41.3%	22.8%
Final count	13,169	12,061	–
TD before election
Gerard Sweetman
Fine Gael
TD after election
Patrick Malone
Fine Gael

A Dáil by-election was held in the constituency of Kildare in Ireland on Tuesday, 14 April 1970, to fill a vacancy in the 19th Dáil. It followed the death of Fine Gael Teachta Dála (TD) Gerard Sweetman on 28 January 1970.

The writ of election to fill the vacancy was agreed by the Dáil on 18 March 1970.

The by-election was won by the Fine Gael candidate Patrick Malone. It was held on the same day as the 1970 Longford–Westmeath by-election. Both by-elections were won by Fine Gael candidates.

== Result ==
1970 Kildare by-election
Party	Candidate	FPv%	Count	
Party	Candidate	FPv%	1	2
Fianna Fáil	Eamon Kane	41.3	10,754	12,061
Fine Gael	Patrick Malone	35.9	9,335	13,169
Labour	Joseph Bermingham	22.8	5,923	
Electorate: 36,284 Valid: 26,012 Quota: 13,007 Turnout: 71.7%
