= John Conlan =

John Conlan may refer to:

- Jocko Conlan (1899–1989), Hall of Fame baseball umpire
- John Conlan (American politician) (1930–2021), U.S. representative from Arizona; son of Jocko Conlan
- John Conlan (Kildare politician), Irish Farmers' Party politician, represented Kildare in the 1920s
- John Conlan (Monaghan politician) (1928–2004), Irish Fine Gael politician
