= Joseph Bermingham =

Irish politician (1919–1995)

Minister of State
- 1982–1986: Finance
- 1981–1982: Finance

Teachta Dála
- In office February 1973 – February 1987
- Constituency: Kildare

Personal details
- Born: 9 May 1919 County Kildare, Ireland
- Died: 11 August 1995 (aged 76) County Kildare, Ireland
- Party: Labour Party
- Education: O'Brien Institute

Joseph Bermingham (9 May 1919 – 11 August 1995) was an Irish Labour Party politician.

Bermingham was born in Castlemitchell, County Kildare. He was educated at the Christian Brothers school in Athy and the O'Brien Institute in Dublin. Bermingham worked as a shopkeeper before being elected in 1967 as a member of Kildare County Council. He was an unsuccessful candidate for Dáil Éireann at the 1969 general election and at a by-election in 1970. He was elected to the 20th Dáil as Labour Party Teachta Dála (TD) for the Kildare constituency at the 1973 general election.

After the 1981 general election, Labour and Fine Gael formed a coalition government. Bermingham was appointed by the government to the position of Minister of State at the Department of Finance with responsibility for the Office of Public Works. He served in that post until early 1982 when the government of Garret FitzGerald fell in a vote on the budget. When a new Fine Gael–Labour Party coalition came to power after the November 1982 general election Bermingham returned to same position. He lost that position as part of a reshuffle in February 1986.

Bermingham resigned from the Labour Party in June 1986, which left the government parties in a minority in the Dáil. He did not contest the 1987 general election. He remained active in local politics and was elected to Kildare County Council in 1991 as an Independent.

Political offices
Preceded by Tom McEllistrim	Minister of State at the Department of Finance; 1981–1982	Succeeded by Sylvester Barrett
Preceded by Sylvester Barrett	Minister of State at the Department of Finance; 1982–1986	Succeeded by Avril Doyle

Dáil	Election	Deputy (Party)	Deputy (Party)	Deputy (Party)
4th	1923	Hugh Colohan (Lab)	John Conlan (FP)	George Wolfe (CnaG)
5th	1927 (Jun)	Hugh Colohan (Lab)	Domhnall Ua Buachalla (FF)	George Wolfe (CnaG)
6th	1927 (Sep)	Hugh Colohan (Lab)	Domhnall Ua Buachalla (FF)	George Wolfe (CnaG)
6th	1931 by-election	Thomas Harris (FF)	Domhnall Ua Buachalla (FF)	George Wolfe (CnaG)
7th	1932	Thomas Harris (FF)	William Norton (Lab)	Sydney Minch (CnaG)
8th	1933	Thomas Harris (FF)	William Norton (Lab)	Sydney Minch (CnaG)
9th	1937	Constituency abolished. See Carlow–Kildare		

Dáil	Election	Deputy (Party)	Deputy (Party)	Deputy (Party)	Deputy (Party)	Deputy (Party)
13th	1948	William Norton (Lab)	Thomas Harris (FF)	Gerard Sweetman (FG)	3 seats until 1961	3 seats until 1961
14th	1951	William Norton (Lab)	Thomas Harris (FF)	Gerard Sweetman (FG)	3 seats until 1961	3 seats until 1961
15th	1954	William Norton (Lab)	Thomas Harris (FF)	Gerard Sweetman (FG)	3 seats until 1961	3 seats until 1961
16th	1957	William Norton (Lab)	Patrick Dooley (FF)	Gerard Sweetman (FG)	3 seats until 1961	3 seats until 1961
17th	1961	William Norton (Lab)	Patrick Dooley (FF)	Gerard Sweetman (FG)	Brendan Crinion (FF)	4 seats 1961–1969
17th	1964 by-election	Terence Boylan (FF)	Patrick Dooley (FF)	Gerard Sweetman (FG)	Brendan Crinion (FF)	4 seats 1961–1969
18th	1965	Terence Boylan (FF)	Patrick Norton (Lab)	Gerard Sweetman (FG)	Brendan Crinion (FF)	4 seats 1961–1969
19th	1969	Terence Boylan (FF)	Paddy Power (FF)	Gerard Sweetman (FG)	3 seats 1969–1981	3 seats 1969–1981
19th	1970 by-election	Terence Boylan (FF)	Paddy Power (FF)	Patrick Malone (FG)	3 seats 1969–1981	3 seats 1969–1981
20th	1973	Joseph Bermingham (Lab)	Paddy Power (FF)	Patrick Malone (FG)	3 seats 1969–1981	3 seats 1969–1981
21st	1977	Joseph Bermingham (Lab)	Paddy Power (FF)	Charlie McCreevy (FF)	3 seats 1969–1981	3 seats 1969–1981
22nd	1981	Joseph Bermingham (Lab)	Paddy Power (FF)	Charlie McCreevy (FF)	Bernard Durkan (FG)	Alan Dukes (FG)
23rd	1982 (Feb)	Joseph Bermingham (Lab)	Paddy Power (FF)	Charlie McCreevy (FF)	Gerry Brady (FF)	Alan Dukes (FG)
24th	1982 (Nov)	Joseph Bermingham (Lab)	Paddy Power (FF)	Charlie McCreevy (FF)	Bernard Durkan (FG)	Alan Dukes (FG)
25th	1987	Emmet Stagg (Lab)	Paddy Power (FF)	Charlie McCreevy (FF)	Bernard Durkan (FG)	Alan Dukes (FG)
26th	1989	Emmet Stagg (Lab)	Seán Power (FF)	Charlie McCreevy (FF)	Bernard Durkan (FG)	Alan Dukes (FG)
27th	1992	Emmet Stagg (Lab)	Seán Power (FF)	Charlie McCreevy (FF)	Bernard Durkan (FG)	Alan Dukes (FG)
28th	1997	Constituency abolished. See Kildare North and Kildare South				
