= Kildare (Dáil constituency) =

Dáil constituency (1923–1937)

- Former Dáil constituency

Former constituency
- Created: 1923
- Abolished: 1937
- Seats: 3
- Local government area: County Kildare
- Created from: Kildare–Wicklow
- Replaced by: Carlow–Kildare

Kildare
- Former Dáil constituency

Former constituency
- Created: 1948
- Abolished: 1997
- Seats: 3 (1948–1961); 4 (1961–1969); 3 (1969–1981); 5 (1981–1997)
- Local government area: County Kildare
- Created from: Carlow–Kildare
- Replaced by: Kildare North; Kildare South

Kildare was a parliamentary constituency represented in Dáil Éireann, the lower house of the Irish parliament or Oireachtas from 1923 to 1937 and from 1948 to 1997. The method of election was proportional representation by means of the single transferable vote (PR-STV).

== History and boundaries ==
Covering all or part of County Kildare, the constituency existed for two distinct periods: from 1923 to 1937, and from 1948 to 1997. From 1923 to 1937 Kildare elected 3 deputies (Teachtaí Dála, commonly known as TDs), until it was absorbed into a new Carlow–Kildare constituency in 1937. After its re-establishment in 1948 it initially elected 3 TDs. This was increased to 4 seats in 1961, reduced again to 3 in 1969, and increased to 5 from 1981 until its abolition in 1997. Its boundaries were significantly revised on several occasions.

The constituency was abolished for the 1997 general election, when it was replaced by two new constituencies: Kildare North and Kildare South.

== TDs ==
=== TDs 1923–1937 ===
Teachtaí Dála (TDs) for Kildare 1923–1937
Key to parties: CnaG = Cumann na nGaedheal; FP = Farmers' Party; FF = Fianna Fáil; Lab = Labour
| Dáil | Election | Deputy (Party) | Deputy (Party) | Deputy (Party) |
| 4th | 1923 | Hugh Colohan (Lab) | John Conlan (FP) | George Wolfe (CnaG) |
| 5th | 1927 (Jun) | Hugh Colohan (Lab) | Domhnall Ua Buachalla (FF) | George Wolfe (CnaG) |
| 6th | 1927 (Sep) | Hugh Colohan (Lab) | Domhnall Ua Buachalla (FF) | George Wolfe (CnaG) |
| 6th | 1931 by-election | Thomas Harris (FF) | Domhnall Ua Buachalla (FF) | George Wolfe (CnaG) |
| 7th | 1932 | Thomas Harris (FF) | William Norton (Lab) | Sydney Minch (CnaG) |
| 8th | 1933 | Thomas Harris (FF) | William Norton (Lab) | Sydney Minch (CnaG) |
| 9th | 1937 | Constituency abolished. See Carlow–Kildare | | |

Note: The columns in this table are used only for presentational purposes, and no significance should be attached to the order of columns. For details of the order in which seats were won at each election, see the detailed results of that election.

=== TDs 1948–1997 ===
Teachtaí Dála (TDs) for Kildare 1948–1997
Key to parties: FF = Fianna Fáil; FG = Fine Gael; Lab = Labour
| Dáil | Election | Deputy (Party) | Deputy (Party) | Deputy (Party) | Deputy (Party) | Deputy (Party) |
| 13th | 1948 | William Norton (Lab) | Thomas Harris (FF) | Gerard Sweetman (FG) | 3 seats until 1961 | 3 seats until 1961 |
| 14th | 1951 | William Norton (Lab) | Thomas Harris (FF) | Gerard Sweetman (FG) | 3 seats until 1961 | 3 seats until 1961 |
| 15th | 1954 | William Norton (Lab) | Thomas Harris (FF) | Gerard Sweetman (FG) | 3 seats until 1961 | 3 seats until 1961 |
| 16th | 1957 | William Norton (Lab) | Patrick Dooley (FF) | Gerard Sweetman (FG) | 3 seats until 1961 | 3 seats until 1961 |
| 17th | 1961 | William Norton (Lab) | Patrick Dooley (FF) | Gerard Sweetman (FG) | Brendan Crinion (FF) | 4 seats 1961–1969 |
| 17th | 1964 by-election | Terence Boylan (FF) | Patrick Dooley (FF) | Gerard Sweetman (FG) | Brendan Crinion (FF) | 4 seats 1961–1969 |
| 18th | 1965 | Terence Boylan (FF) | Patrick Norton (Lab) | Gerard Sweetman (FG) | Brendan Crinion (FF) | 4 seats 1961–1969 |
| 19th | 1969 | Terence Boylan (FF) | Paddy Power (FF) | Gerard Sweetman (FG) | 3 seats 1969–1981 | 3 seats 1969–1981 |
| 19th | 1970 by-election | Terence Boylan (FF) | Paddy Power (FF) | Patrick Malone (FG) | 3 seats 1969–1981 | 3 seats 1969–1981 |
| 20th | 1973 | Joseph Bermingham (Lab) | Paddy Power (FF) | Patrick Malone (FG) | 3 seats 1969–1981 | 3 seats 1969–1981 |
| 21st | 1977 | Joseph Bermingham (Lab) | Paddy Power (FF) | Charlie McCreevy (FF) | 3 seats 1969–1981 | 3 seats 1969–1981 |
| 22nd | 1981 | Joseph Bermingham (Lab) | Paddy Power (FF) | Charlie McCreevy (FF) | Bernard Durkan (FG) | Alan Dukes (FG) |
| 23rd | 1982 (Feb) | Joseph Bermingham (Lab) | Paddy Power (FF) | Charlie McCreevy (FF) | Gerry Brady (FF) | Alan Dukes (FG) |
| 24th | 1982 (Nov) | Joseph Bermingham (Lab) | Paddy Power (FF) | Charlie McCreevy (FF) | Bernard Durkan (FG) | Alan Dukes (FG) |
| 25th | 1987 | Emmet Stagg (Lab) | Paddy Power (FF) | Charlie McCreevy (FF) | Bernard Durkan (FG) | Alan Dukes (FG) |
| 26th | 1989 | Emmet Stagg (Lab) | Seán Power (FF) | Charlie McCreevy (FF) | Bernard Durkan (FG) | Alan Dukes (FG) |
| 27th | 1992 | Emmet Stagg (Lab) | Seán Power (FF) | Charlie McCreevy (FF) | Bernard Durkan (FG) | Alan Dukes (FG) |
| 28th | 1997 | Constituency abolished. See Kildare North and Kildare South | | | | |

Note: The columns in this table are used only for presentational purposes, and no significance should be attached to the order of columns. For details of the order in which seats were won at each election, see the detailed results of that election.

== Elections ==
*: Outgoing TD

=== 1992 general election ===
1992 general election: Kildare
| Party | Candidate | FPv% | Count | | | | | | | | | | | |
| Party | Candidate | FPv% | 1 | 2 | 3 | 4 | 5 | 6 | 7 | 8 | 9 | 10 | 11 | 12 |
|---|---|---|---|---|---|---|---|---|---|---|---|---|---|---|
| Labour | Emmet Stagg | 21.1 | 10,656 | | | | | | | | | | | |
| Fianna Fáil | Charlie McCreevy | 20.3 | 10,208 | | | | | | | | | | | |
| Fine Gael | Alan Dukes | 13.3 | 6,705 | 6,877 | 6,966 | 6,981 | 7,026 | 7,139 | 7,311 | 7,512 | 7,749 | 8,132 | 10,144 | |
| Fine Gael | Bernard Durkan | 9.1 | 4,604 | 4,736 | 4,809 | 4,814 | 4,822 | 4,928 | 4,974 | 5,075 | 5,288 | 5,356 | 6,078 | 7,413 |
| Fianna Fáil | Seán Power | 7.6 | 3,809 | 3,899 | 4,829 | 4,833 | 4,918 | 5,030 | 5,162 | 5,285 | 5,434 | 8,036 | 8,527 | |
| Progressive Democrats | John Dardis | 7.0 | 3,529 | 3,590 | 3,644 | 3,653 | 3,669 | 3,768 | 3,873 | 4,031 | 4,195 | 4,321 | | |
| Labour | Jack Wall | 5.7 | 2,859 | 4,359 | 4,397 | 4,412 | 4,733 | 4,825 | 4,965 | 5,272 | 6,131 | 6,343 | 6,887 | 7,094 |
| Fianna Fáil | Seán Ó Fearghaíl | 5.7 | 2,858 | 2,895 | 3,411 | 3,420 | 3,481 | 3,518 | 3,613 | 3,707 | 3,780 | | | |
| Democratic Left | Catherine Murphy | 3.2 | 1,613 | 1,732 | 1,762 | 1,770 | 1,790 | 1,833 | 1,856 | 2,018 | | | | |
| Green | Seán English | 2.1 | 1,064 | 1,112 | 1,133 | 1,167 | 1,219 | 1,337 | 1,454 | | | | | |
| Independent | Nick Hegarty | 1.7 | 853 | 882 | 899 | 939 | 951 | 1,005 | | | | | | |
| Independent | Patsy Lawlor | 1.5 | 745 | 784 | 812 | 830 | 858 | | | | | | | |
| Sinn Féin | Paddy Wright | 1.4 | 719 | 741 | 749 | 752 | | | | | | | | |
| Independent | Liz Garrett | 0.4 | 177 | 184 | 188 | | | | | | | | | |
Electorate: 78,069 Valid: 50,399 Spoilt: 746 (1.5%) Quota: 8,400 Turnout: 51,145 (65.5%)

=== 1989 general election ===
1989 general election: Kildare
| Party | Candidate | FPv% | Count | | | | | | | | |
| Party | Candidate | FPv% | 1 | 2 | 3 | 4 | 5 | 6 | 7 | 8 | 9 |
|---|---|---|---|---|---|---|---|---|---|---|---|
| Fine Gael | Alan Dukes | 18.0 | 9,182 | | | | | | | | |
| Fianna Fáil | Charlie McCreevy | 17.6 | 8,977 | | | | | | | | |
| Labour | Emmet Stagg | 17.2 | 8,767 | | | | | | | | |
| Fine Gael | Bernard Durkan | 13.1 | 6,676 | 7,236 | 7,261 | 7,328 | 7,659 | 8,107 | 9,704 | | |
| Fianna Fáil | Seán Power | 11.6 | 5,918 | 5,942 | 6,183 | 6,221 | 6,401 | 6,559 | 6,791 | 6,977 | 7,670 |
| Fianna Fáil | Seán Ó Fearghaíl | 7.1 | 3,603 | 3,621 | 3,816 | 3,833 | 3,970 | 4,085 | 4,187 | 4,387 | 5,256 |
| Independent | Carol Tiernan | 5.3 | 2,690 | 2,702 | 2,706 | 2,725 | 2,911 | 3,418 | 3,588 | 3,957 | |
| Progressive Democrats | Timmy Conway | 4.2 | 2,126 | 2,179 | 2,190 | 2,214 | 2,416 | 2,589 | | | |
| Workers' Party | Catherine Murphy | 3.0 | 1,520 | 1,531 | 1,539 | 1,632 | 1,936 | | | | |
| Green | Seán English | 2.9 | 1,462 | 1,479 | 1,485 | 1,507 | | | | | |
Electorate: 78,724 Valid: 50,921 Quota: 8,487 Turnout: 64.7%

=== 1987 general election ===
1987 general election: Kildare
| Party | Candidate | FPv% | Count | | | | | | | |
| Party | Candidate | FPv% | 1 | 2 | 3 | 4 | 5 | 6 | 7 | 8 |
|---|---|---|---|---|---|---|---|---|---|---|
| Fianna Fáil | Paddy Power | 14.2 | 7,649 | 7,694 | 7,957 | 8,899 | 8,987 | | | |
| Labour | Emmet Stagg | 14.1 | 7,567 | 8,295 | 8,768 | 8,888 | 9,004 | | | |
| Fine Gael | Alan Dukes | 13.9 | 7,453 | 7,490 | 7,584 | 7,669 | 8,054 | 10,137 | | |
| Fine Gael | Bernard Durkan | 12.4 | 6,671 | 6,763 | 6,795 | 6,816 | 6,953 | 8,561 | 9,665 | |
| Fianna Fáil | Gerry Brady | 11.7 | 6,297 | 6,370 | 6,469 | 7,178 | 7,211 | 7,649 | 7,688 | 7,864 |
| Fianna Fáil | Charlie McCreevy | 11.7 | 6,292 | 6,357 | 6,504 | 7,280 | 7,387 | 7,972 | 8,015 | 8,265 |
| Progressive Democrats | Eoin McBennett | 6.3 | 3,407 | 3,458 | 3,505 | 3,537 | 5,713 | | | |
| Progressive Democrats | Frank Masterson | 5.4 | 2,913 | 2,959 | 3,050 | 3,112 | | | | |
| Fianna Fáil | Seán Ó Fearghaíl | 5.0 | 2,675 | 2,696 | 2,798 | | | | | |
| Sinn Féin | Patrick Wright | 2.6 | 1,420 | 1,528 | | | | | | |
| Workers' Party | Colm Purcell | 2.3 | 1,238 | | | | | | | |
| Independent | Frederick Leavy | 0.2 | 123 | | | | | | | |
Electorate: 74,340 Valid: 53,705 Quota: 8,951 Turnout: 72.2%

=== November 1982 general election ===
November 1982 general election: Kildare
| Party | Candidate | FPv% | Count | | | |
| Party | Candidate | FPv% | 1 | 2 | 3 | 4 |
|---|---|---|---|---|---|---|
| Fine Gael | Bernard Durkan | 19.8 | 9,594 | | | |
| Fianna Fáil | Charlie McCreevy | 17.8 | 8,589 | | | |
| Fine Gael | Alan Dukes | 16.7 | 8,057 | 9,428 | | |
| Fianna Fáil | Paddy Power | 16.5 | 7,969 | 7,987 | 8,186 | |
| Labour | Joseph Bermingham | 15.2 | 7,366 | 7,447 | 7,514 | 8,602 |
| Fianna Fáil | Gerry Brady | 9.6 | 4,637 | 4,692 | 4,882 | 4,963 |
| Fianna Fáil | Paddy Aspell | 4.0 | 1,929 | 1,935 | 2,002 | 2,020 |
| Independent | Seán Thompson | 0.3 | 149 | 150 | 153 | 165 |
| Independent | Michael McManus | 0.1 | 69 | 71 | 74 | 94 |
Electorate: 67,830 Valid: 48,359 Quota: 8,060 Turnout: 71.3%

=== February 1982 general election ===
February 1982 general election: Kildare
| Party | Candidate | FPv% | Count | | | |
| Party | Candidate | FPv% | 1 | 2 | 3 | 4 |
|---|---|---|---|---|---|---|
| Fianna Fáil | Charlie McCreevy | 24.7 | 11,497 | | | |
| Fine Gael | Alan Dukes | 19.1 | 8,881 | | | |
| Labour | Joseph Bermingham | 16.1 | 7,491 | 7,750 | | |
| Fianna Fáil | Paddy Power | 13.2 | 6,145 | 7,841 | | |
| Fianna Fáil | Gerry Brady | 10.9 | 5,063 | 6,270 | 6,286 | 7,664 |
| Fine Gael | Bernard Durkan | 9.1 | 4,245 | 4,393 | 5,224 | 5,253 |
| Fine Gael | Patsy Lawlor | 3.8 | 1,768 | 1,879 | 2,158 | 2,235 |
| Fianna Fáil | Leonore O'Rourke-Glynn | 3.0 | 1,374 | 1,705 | 1,715 | |
Electorate: 63,834 Valid: 46,464 Quota: 7,745 Turnout: 72.8%

=== 1981 general election ===
1981 general election: Kildare
| Party | Candidate | FPv% | Count | | | | | | | | |
| Party | Candidate | FPv% | 1 | 2 | 3 | 4 | 5 | 6 | 7 | 8 | 9 |
|---|---|---|---|---|---|---|---|---|---|---|---|
| Fianna Fáil | Paddy Power | 20.8 | 9,768 | | | | | | | | |
| Fianna Fáil | Charlie McCreevy | 15.0 | 7,053 | 8,052 | | | | | | | |
| Labour | Joseph Bermingham | 12.3 | 5,803 | 5,899 | 6,022 | 6,030 | 7,936 | | | | |
| Fine Gael | Bernard Durkan | 11.9 | 5,612 | 5,640 | 5,693 | 5,695 | 6,132 | 6,190 | 6,233 | 8,488 | |
| Fine Gael | Alan Dukes | 10.1 | 4,762 | 4,785 | 4,837 | 4,838 | 4,915 | 5,009 | 5,024 | 7,063 | 7,685 |
| Fine Gael | Patsy Lawlor | 9.5 | 4,469 | 4,524 | 4,580 | 4,586 | 4,763 | 4,943 | 4,964 | | |
| Fianna Fáil | Gerry Brady | 7.6 | 3,584 | 3,780 | 3,914 | 4,004 | 4,200 | 6,404 | 6,417 | 6,637 | 6,659 |
| Labour | Emmet Stagg | 6.0 | 2,832 | 2,867 | 2,972 | 2,975 | | | | | |
| Fianna Fáil | Martin Miley | 5.3 | 2,479 | 2,960 | 3,046 | 3,144 | 3,229 | | | | |
| Independent | Evelyn Bracken | 1.5 | 698 | 709 | | | | | | | |
Electorate: 63,834 Valid: 47,060 Quota: 7,844 Turnout: 73.7%

=== 1977 general election ===
1977 general election: Kildare
| Party | Candidate | FPv% | Count | | | | |
| Party | Candidate | FPv% | 1 | 2 | 3 | 4 | 5 |
|---|---|---|---|---|---|---|---|
| Fianna Fáil | Paddy Power | 35.1 | 11,621 | | | | |
| Labour | Joseph Bermingham | 21.4 | 7,070 | 7,289 | 7,445 | 7,951 | 8,268 |
| Fianna Fáil | Charlie McCreevy | 14.0 | 4,624 | 5,841 | 5,854 | 5,930 | 10,413 |
| Fine Gael | Patrick Malone | 11.7 | 3,858 | 3,927 | 4,198 | 5,742 | 5,833 |
| Fianna Fáil | Martin Miley | 9.7 | 3,223 | 5,007 | 5,038 | 5,102 | |
| Fine Gael | Patrick Hyland | 5.1 | 1,696 | 1,730 | 2,267 | | |
| Fine Gael | Philip Hennessy | 3.1 | 1,025 | 1,043 | | | |
Electorate: 44,088 Valid: 33,117 Spoilt: 268 (0.8%) Quota: 8,280 Turnout: 33,385 (75.7%)

=== 1973 general election ===
1973 general election: Kildare
| Party | Candidate | FPv% | Count | | | | |
| Party | Candidate | FPv% | 1 | 2 | 3 | 4 | 5 |
|---|---|---|---|---|---|---|---|
| Fianna Fáil | Paddy Power | 29.3 | 8,894 | | | | |
| Labour | Joseph Bermingham | 22.4 | 6,791 | 6,872 | 7,237 | 7,546 | 7,750 |
| Fine Gael | Patrick Malone | 21.7 | 6,581 | 6,637 | 7,905 | | |
| Fianna Fáil | Terence Boylan | 16.2 | 4,898 | 5,602 | 5,633 | 5,640 | 7,189 |
| Fine Gael | James McEvoy | 5.7 | 1,716 | 1,789 | | | |
| Fianna Fáil | Patrick Dooley | 4.8 | 1,441 | 1,890 | 1,933 | 1,941 | |
Electorate: 40,065 Valid: 30,321 Quota: 7,581 Turnout: 75.7%

=== 1970 by-election ===
Following the death of Fine Gael TD Gerard Sweetman, a by-election was held on 14 April 1970. The seat was won by the Fine Gael candidate Patrick Malone.

1970 by-election: Kildare
| Party | Candidate | FPv% | Count | |
| Party | Candidate | FPv% | 1 | 2 |
|---|---|---|---|---|
| Fianna Fáil | Eamon Kane | 41.3 | 10,754 | 12,061 |
| Fine Gael | Patrick Malone | 35.9 | 9,335 | 13,169 |
| Labour | Joseph Bermingham | 22.8 | 5,923 | |
Electorate: 36,284 Valid: 26,012 Quota: 13,007 Turnout: 71.7%

=== 1969 general election ===
1969 general election: Kildare
| Party | Candidate | FPv% | Count | | | | | | | |
| Party | Candidate | FPv% | 1 | 2 | 3 | 4 | 5 | 6 | 7 | 8 |
|---|---|---|---|---|---|---|---|---|---|---|
| Fianna Fáil | Terence Boylan | 24.9 | 6,903 | 7,100 | | | | | | |
| Fine Gael | Gerard Sweetman | 22.8 | 6,323 | 6,628 | 6,637 | 7,483 | | | | |
| Fianna Fáil | Paddy Power | 12.0 | 3,327 | 3,515 | 3,609 | 3,719 | 3,736 | 3,814 | 5,262 | 5,734 |
| Labour | Joseph Bermingham | 9.8 | 2,711 | 2,889 | 2,902 | 2,991 | 3,014 | 4,336 | 4,449 | 4,911 |
| Fianna Fáil | Patrick Norton | 6.5 | 1,806 | 1,880 | 1,908 | 1,963 | 1,976 | 2,042 | | |
| Labour | Michael Brady | 6.3 | 1,732 | 1,878 | 1,888 | 1,963 | 1,974 | | | |
| Fine Gael | Michael McWey | 6.2 | 1,709 | 1,827 | 1,834 | | | | | |
| Fine Gael | Anne Moore | 6.1 | 1,694 | 1,887 | 1,900 | 2,451 | 2,944 | 3,127 | 3,231 | |
| Independent | Michael St. Leger | 5.4 | 1,496 | | | | | | | |
Electorate: 36,284 Valid: 27,701 Quota: 6,926 Turnout: 76.3%

=== 1965 general election ===
1965 general election: Kildare
| Party | Candidate | FPv% | Count | | | |
| Party | Candidate | FPv% | 1 | 2 | 3 | 4 |
|---|---|---|---|---|---|---|
| Fianna Fáil | Brendan Crinion | 21.0 | 7,129 | | | |
| Labour | Patrick Norton | 20.9 | 7,087 | | | |
| Fine Gael | Gerard Sweetman | 20.0 | 6,797 | | | |
| Fianna Fáil | Terence Boylan | 15.2 | 5,156 | 5,343 | 5,434 | 5,627 |
| Fianna Fáil | Patrick Dooley | 12.6 | 4,269 | 4,404 | 4,554 | 4,779 |
| Fine Gael | Matthew O'Connor | 5.6 | 1,915 | 1,931 | 2,987 | |
| Fine Gael | Charles Chambers | 4.6 | 1,559 | 1,567 | | |
Electorate: 44,565 Valid: 33,912 Quota: 6,783 Turnout: 76.1%

=== 1964 by-election ===
Following the death of Labour Party TD William Norton, a by-election was held on 19 February 1964. The seat was won by the Fianna Fáil candidate Terence Boylan.

1964 by-election: Kildare
| Party | Candidate | FPv% | Count | |
| Party | Candidate | FPv% | 1 | 2 |
|---|---|---|---|---|
| Fianna Fáil | Terence Boylan | 43.5 | 13,905 | 15,973 |
| Fine Gael | Patrick Malone | 30.8 | 9,825 | 14,254 |
| Labour | Patrick Norton | 25.7 | 8,214 | |
Electorate: 43,779 Valid: 31,944 Quota: 15,973 Turnout: 73.0%

=== 1961 general election ===
1961 general election: Kildare
| Party | Candidate | FPv% | Count | | | | | |
| Party | Candidate | FPv% | 1 | 2 | 3 | 4 | 5 | 6 |
|---|---|---|---|---|---|---|---|---|
| Labour | William Norton | 25.4 | 8,015 | | | | | |
| Fine Gael | Gerard Sweetman | 22.3 | 7,035 | | | | | |
| Fianna Fáil | Patrick Dooley | 18.6 | 5,865 | 6,468 | | | | |
| Fianna Fáil | Brendan Crinion | 12.4 | 3,908 | 4,036 | 4,065 | 4,100 | 4,319 | 6,664 |
| Fianna Fáil | Terence Groome | 9.6 | 3,033 | 3,303 | 3,342 | 3,392 | 3,512 | |
| Fine Gael | John Keegan | 6.1 | 1,913 | 2,225 | 2,482 | 2,501 | | |
| Fine Gael | Charles Chambers | 5.8 | 1,827 | 2,209 | 2,599 | 2,643 | 4,209 | 4,361 |
Electorate: 44,108 Valid: 31,596 Quota: 6,320 Turnout: 71.6%

=== 1957 general election ===
1957 general election: Kildare
| Party | Candidate | FPv% | Count | |
| Party | Candidate | FPv% | 1 | 2 |
|---|---|---|---|---|
| Labour | William Norton | 26.5 | 7,038 | |
| Fianna Fáil | Patrick Dooley | 25.8 | 6,860 | |
| Fine Gael | Gerard Sweetman | 23.9 | 6,339 | 6,665 |
| Fianna Fáil | Thomas Harris | 23.8 | 6,311 | 6,385 |
Electorate: 37,422 Valid: 26,548 Quota: 6,638 Turnout: 70.9%

=== 1954 general election ===
1954 general election: Kildare
| Party | Candidate | FPv% | Count | |
| Party | Candidate | FPv% | 1 | 2 |
|---|---|---|---|---|
| Labour | William Norton | 30.4 | 8,501 | |
| Fine Gael | Gerard Sweetman | 28.7 | 8,030 | |
| Fianna Fáil | Thomas Harris | 23.7 | 6,620 | 7,430 |
| Fianna Fáil | Patrick Dooley | 17.2 | 4,791 | 5,496 |
Electorate: 38,011 Valid: 27,942 Quota: 6,986 Turnout: 73.5%

=== 1951 general election ===
1951 general election: Kildare
| Party | Candidate | FPv% | Count | | |
| Party | Candidate | FPv% | 1 | 2 | 3 |
|---|---|---|---|---|---|
| Fianna Fáil | Thomas Harris | 30.4 | 8,348 | | |
| Labour | William Norton | 30.1 | 8,279 | | |
| Fine Gael | Gerard Sweetman | 24.6 | 6,759 | 6,826 | 7,907 |
| Fianna Fáil | Michael Nolan | 14.5 | 3,987 | 5,340 | 5,448 |
| Independent | Peter Keane | 0.4 | 120 | 174 | 390 |
Electorate: 38,147 Valid: 27,493 Quota: 6,874 Turnout: 72.1%

=== 1948 general election ===
1948 general election: Kildare
| Party | Candidate | FPv% | Count | | | | | |
| Party | Candidate | FPv% | 1 | 2 | 3 | 4 | 5 | 6 |
|---|---|---|---|---|---|---|---|---|
| Fianna Fáil | Thomas Harris | 29.6 | 7,792 | | | | | |
| Labour | William Norton | 26.3 | 6,939 | | | | | |
| Fine Gael | Gerard Sweetman | 19.1 | 5,022 | 5,080 | 5,155 | 5,582 | 5,638 | 6,068 |
| Clann na Poblachta | Daniel T. Boland | 10.7 | 2,821 | 2,868 | 3,025 | 3,067 | 3,696 | 4,237 |
| Fianna Fáil | Michael G. Nolan | 9.3 | 2,452 | 3,517 | 3,577 | 3,627 | 3,666 | |
| Clann na Poblachta | Paudge Brennan | 3.0 | 779 | 799 | 846 | 856 | | |
| Fine Gael | Michael Cunningham | 2.1 | 548 | 561 | 572 | | | |
Electorate: 37,737 Valid: 26,353 Quota: 6,589 Turnout: 69.8%

=== 1933 general election ===
1933 general election: Kildare
| Party | Candidate | FPv% | Count | | |
| Party | Candidate | FPv% | 1 | 2 | 3 |
|---|---|---|---|---|---|
| Fianna Fáil | Thomas Harris | 29.5 | 7,799 | | |
| Cumann na nGaedheal | Sydney Minch | 23.8 | 6,304 | 6,330 | 6,532 |
| Labour | William Norton | 20.0 | 5,292 | 5,517 | 8,487 |
| National Centre Party | Frederick B. Barton | 16.7 | 4,408 | 4,417 | 4,494 |
| Fianna Fáil | Brigid Darby | 10.0 | 2,636 | 3,565 | |
Electorate: 33,782 Valid: 26,439 Quota: 6,610 Turnout: 78.3%

=== 1932 general election ===
1932 general election: Kildare
| Party | Candidate | FPv% | Count | | |
| Party | Candidate | FPv% | 1 | 2 | 3 |
|---|---|---|---|---|---|
| Fianna Fáil | Thomas Harris | 26.9 | 6,510 | | |
| Labour | William Norton | 22.7 | 5,496 | 5,527 | 5,875 |
| Cumann na nGaedheal | Sydney Minch | 19.2 | 4,653 | 4,665 | 7,777 |
| Fianna Fáil | Domhnall Ua Buachalla | 15.7 | 3,802 | 4,211 | 4,313 |
| Cumann na nGaedheal | Michael Fitzsimons | 15.4 | 3,735 | 3,743 | |
Electorate: 33,595 Valid: 24,196 Quota: 6,050 Turnout: 72.0%

=== 1931 by-election ===
Following the death of Labour Party TD Hugh Colohan, a by-election was held on 29 June 1931. The seat was won by the Fianna Fáil candidate Thomas Harris.

1931 by-election: Kildare
| Party | Candidate | FPv% | Count | |
| Party | Candidate | FPv% | 1 | 2 |
|---|---|---|---|---|
| Fianna Fáil | Thomas Harris | 40.0 | 10,041 | 11,612 |
| Cumann na nGaedheal | John Curton | 33.4 | 8,374 | 11,103 |
| Labour | William Norton | 26.6 | 6,669 | |
Electorate: 38,815 Valid: 25,084 Quota: 12,543 Turnout: 64.6%

=== September 1927 general election ===
September 1927 general election: Kildare
| Party | Candidate | FPv% | Count | | | | |
| Party | Candidate | FPv% | 1 | 2 | 3 | 4 | 5 |
|---|---|---|---|---|---|---|---|
| Cumann na nGaedheal | George Wolfe | 29.6 | 6,494 | | | | |
| Fianna Fáil | Domhnall Ua Buachalla | 28.5 | 6,261 | | | | |
| Farmers' Party | John Conlan | 14.9 | 3,284 | 4,067 | 4,099 | 4,227 | 4,555 |
| Labour | Hugh Colohan | 14.8 | 3,251 | 3,394 | 3,537 | 4,271 | 5,667 |
| Fianna Fáil | Thomas Murphy | 7.7 | 1,694 | 1,715 | 2,289 | 2,397 | |
| Labour | Michael Smyth | 4.5 | 985 | 1,039 | 1,058 | | |
Electorate: 34,815 Valid: 21,969 Quota: 5,493 Turnout: 63.1%

=== June 1927 general election ===
June 1927 general election: Kildare
| Party | Candidate | FPv% | Count | | | | | | | | | |
| Party | Candidate | FPv% | 1 | 2 | 3 | 4 | 5 | 6 | 7 | 8 | 9 | 10 |
|---|---|---|---|---|---|---|---|---|---|---|---|---|
| Fianna Fáil | Domhnall Ua Buachalla | 18.6 | 4,127 | 4,162 | 4,972 | 5,732 | | | | | | |
| Labour | Hugh Colohan | 18.6 | 4,112 | 4,144 | 4,213 | 4,341 | 4,402 | 4,788 | 5,081 | 5,529 | 7,226 | |
| Cumann na nGaedheal | George Wolfe | 11.0 | 2,438 | 2,577 | 2,589 | 2,608 | 2,612 | 2,771 | 3,675 | 4,197 | 4,296 | 4,496 |
| Farmers' Party | John Conlan | 10.4 | 2,310 | 2,560 | 2,580 | 2,653 | 2,674 | 2,995 | 3,257 | 3,632 | 3,824 | 3,956 |
| Labour | Michael Smyth | 8.4 | 1,865 | 1,900 | 1,934 | 2,036 | 2,056 | 2,148 | 2,182 | 2,342 | | |
| Cumann na nGaedheal | James C. Bergin | 7.0 | 1,559 | 1,606 | 1,613 | 1,634 | 1,647 | 1,726 | | | | |
| National League | Rupert Trench | 6.4 | 1,415 | 1,612 | 1,624 | 1,676 | 1,697 | 1,796 | 1,854 | | | |
| Sinn Féin | Art O'Connor | 5.1 | 1,133 | 1,185 | 1,287 | | | | | | | |
| Independent | John J. Bergin | 5.1 | 1,129 | 1,280 | 1,296 | 1,359 | 1,409 | | | | | |
| Fianna Fáil | James Cregan | 5.0 | 1,098 | 1,109 | | | | | | | | |
| Independent | George Henderson | 4.4 | 979 | | | | | | | | | |
Electorate: 34,815 Valid: 22,165 Quota: 5,542 Turnout: 63.7%

=== 1923 general election ===
1923 general election: Kildare
| Party | Candidate | FPv% | Count | | | | | | | |
| Party | Candidate | FPv% | 1 | 2 | 3 | 4 | 5 | 6 | 7 | 8 |
|---|---|---|---|---|---|---|---|---|---|---|
| Labour | Hugh Colohan | 23.0 | 4,300 | 4,310 | 4,361 | 4,787 | | | | |
| Farmers' Party | John Conlan | 19.5 | 3,650 | 3,672 | 3,762 | 3,868 | 3,903 | 4,174 | 4,435 | 4,941 |
| Republican | Art O'Connor | 12.2 | 2,276 | 2,311 | 2,347 | 3,125 | 3,160 | 3,510 | 3,620 | |
| Cumann na nGaedheal | George Wolfe | 11.7 | 2,186 | 2,198 | 2,494 | 2,517 | 2,518 | 2,698 | 4,475 | 4,624 |
| Cumann na nGaedheal | Thomas Lawler | 10.3 | 1,920 | 1,949 | 2,352 | 2,387 | 2,390 | 2,643 | | |
| Labour | Michael Smyth | 9.2 | 1,712 | 1,722 | 1,769 | 1,892 | 1,931 | | | |
| Republican | Domhnall Ua Buachalla | 8.0 | 1,492 | 1,564 | 1,572 | | | | | |
| Cumann na nGaedheal | Simon Malone | 5.1 | 950 | 956 | | | | | | |
| Republican | Thomas Harris | 1.1 | 206 | | | | | | | |
Electorate: 35,612 Valid: 18,692 Quota: 4,674 Turnout: 52.5%

== See also ==
- Dáil constituencies
- Politics of the Republic of Ireland
- Historic Dáil constituencies
- Elections in the Republic of Ireland
