= 1931 Kildare by-election =

By-election to the 6th Dáil

- 29 June 1931
- Turnout: 25,084 (64.6%)
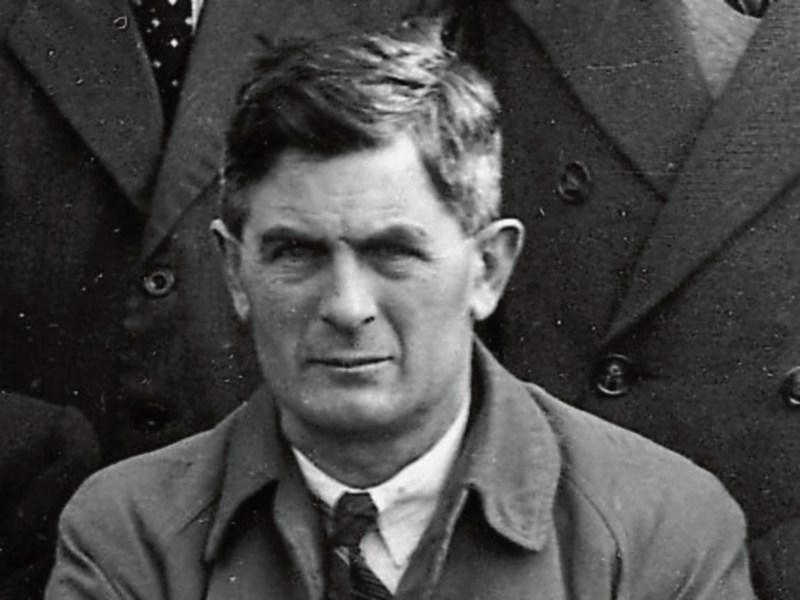

| | | Curton |
| Nominee | Thomas Harris | John Curton | William Norton |
| Party | Fianna Fáil | Cumann na nGaedheal | Labour |
| First preferences | 10,041 | 8,374 | 6,669 |
| Percentage | 40.0% | 33.4% | 26.6% |
| Final count | 11,612 | 11,103 | – |
TD before election
Hugh Colohan
Labour
TD after election
Thomas Harris
Fianna Fáil

A Dáil by-election was held in the constituency of Kildare in the Irish Free State on Monday, 29 June 1931, to fill a vacancy in the 6th Dáil. It followed the death of Labour TD Hugh Colohan on 15 April 1931.

In 1931, Kildare was a three-seat constituency comprising County Kildare.

The writ of election to fill the vacancy was agreed by the Dáil on 11 June 1931. The by-election was won by the Fianna Fáil candidate Thomas Harris.

The third-place candidate William Norton of Labour was elected for Kildare at the 1932 general election.

== Result ==
1931 Kildare by-election
| Party | Candidate | FPv% | Count | |
| Party | Candidate | FPv% | 1 | 2 |
|---|---|---|---|---|
| Fianna Fáil | Thomas Harris | 40.0 | 10,041 | 11,612 |
| Cumann na nGaedheal | John Curton | 33.4 | 8,374 | 11,103 |
| Labour | William Norton | 26.6 | 6,669 | |
Electorate: 38,815 Valid: 25,084 Quota: 12,543 Turnout: 64.6%
