= Paddy Power (Irish politician) =

Irish politician (1928–2013)

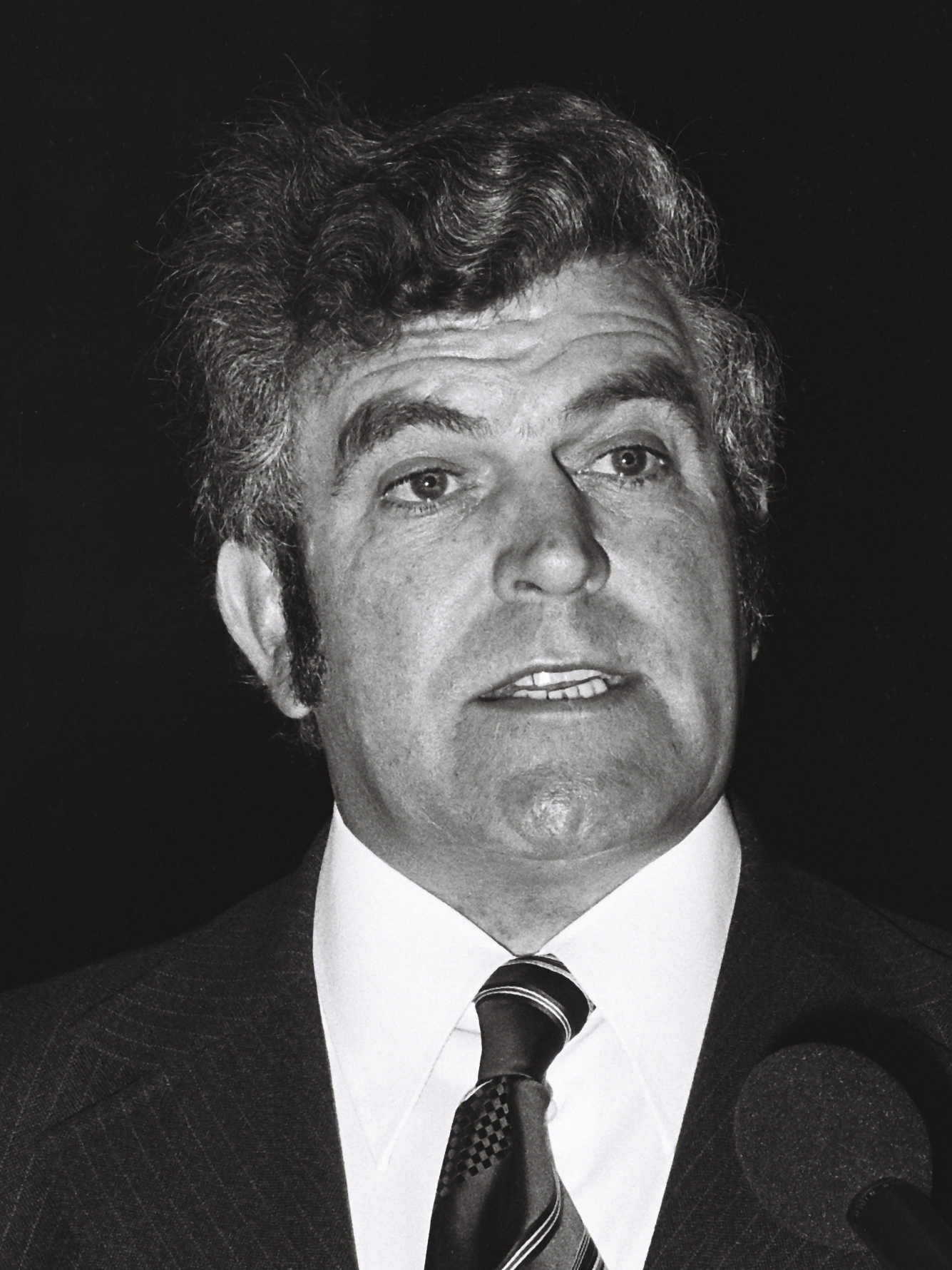
- Power in 1978

Minister for Defence
- In office 9 March 1982 – 14 December 1982
- Taoiseach: Charles Haughey
- Preceded by: James Tully
- Succeeded by: Patrick Cooney

Minister for Trade, Commerce and Tourism
- In office 7 October 1982 – 27 October 1982
- Taoiseach: Charles Haughey
- Preceded by: Desmond O'Malley
- Succeeded by: Pádraig Flynn

Minister for Fisheries and Forestry
- In office 12 December 1979 – 30 June 1981
- Taoiseach: Charles Haughey
- Preceded by: Brian Lenihan
- Succeeded by: Tom Fitzpatrick

Teachta Dála
- In office June 1969 – June 1989
- Constituency: Kildare

Member of the European Parliament
- In office 14 December 1977 – 24 June 1979
- Constituency: Oireachtas Delegation

Personal details
- Born: Patrick Power; 19 November 1928 Naas, County Kildare, Ireland
- Died: 14 August 2013 (aged 84) Caragh, County Kildare, Ireland
- Party: Fianna Fáil
- Children: Seán

Patrick Power (19 November 1928 – 14 August 2013) was an Irish Fianna Fáil politician who served as Minister for Defence from March 1982 to December 1982, Minister for Trade, Commerce and Tourism in October 1982, and Minister for Fisheries and Forestry from 1979 to 1981. He served as Teachta Dála (TD) for the Kildare constituency from 1969 to 1989 and a Member of the European Parliament (MEP) from 1977 to 1979.

A national schoolteacher before entering politics, he was first elected to Dáil Éireann as a Fianna Fáil TD for the Kildare constituency at the 1969 general election.

He served as Minister for Fisheries and Forestry from 1979 to June 1981 and Minister for Defence in the government of March to December 1982. He was briefly Minister for Trade, Commerce and Tourism in October 1982 following the resignation of Desmond O'Malley to challenge for the leadership of the party. He was also a MEP from 1977 to 1979.

His son, Seán Power is a former TD and Minister of State. Another son, J. J. Power, served as a Green Party councillor on Kildare County Council.

Power retired from politics at the 1989 general election. He died on 14 August 2013 in Caragh, County Kildare. He had no connection with the Irish bookmakers of the same name.

== See also ==
- Families in the Oireachtas

Political offices
Preceded by Brian Lenihan	Minister for Fisheries and Forestry; 1979–1981	Succeeded by Tom Fitzpatrick
Preceded by James Tully	Minister for Defence; 1982	Succeeded by Patrick Cooney
Preceded by Desmond O'Malley	Minister for Trade, Commerce and Tourism; 1982	Succeeded by Pádraig Flynn

Dáil	Election	Deputy (Party)	Deputy (Party)	Deputy (Party)
4th	1923	Hugh Colohan (Lab)	John Conlan (FP)	George Wolfe (CnaG)
5th	1927 (Jun)	Hugh Colohan (Lab)	Domhnall Ua Buachalla (FF)	George Wolfe (CnaG)
6th	1927 (Sep)	Hugh Colohan (Lab)	Domhnall Ua Buachalla (FF)	George Wolfe (CnaG)
6th	1931 by-election	Thomas Harris (FF)	Domhnall Ua Buachalla (FF)	George Wolfe (CnaG)
7th	1932	Thomas Harris (FF)	William Norton (Lab)	Sydney Minch (CnaG)
8th	1933	Thomas Harris (FF)	William Norton (Lab)	Sydney Minch (CnaG)
9th	1937	Constituency abolished. See Carlow–Kildare		

Dáil	Election	Deputy (Party)	Deputy (Party)	Deputy (Party)	Deputy (Party)	Deputy (Party)
13th	1948	William Norton (Lab)	Thomas Harris (FF)	Gerard Sweetman (FG)	3 seats until 1961	3 seats until 1961
14th	1951	William Norton (Lab)	Thomas Harris (FF)	Gerard Sweetman (FG)	3 seats until 1961	3 seats until 1961
15th	1954	William Norton (Lab)	Thomas Harris (FF)	Gerard Sweetman (FG)	3 seats until 1961	3 seats until 1961
16th	1957	William Norton (Lab)	Patrick Dooley (FF)	Gerard Sweetman (FG)	3 seats until 1961	3 seats until 1961
17th	1961	William Norton (Lab)	Patrick Dooley (FF)	Gerard Sweetman (FG)	Brendan Crinion (FF)	4 seats 1961–1969
17th	1964 by-election	Terence Boylan (FF)	Patrick Dooley (FF)	Gerard Sweetman (FG)	Brendan Crinion (FF)	4 seats 1961–1969
18th	1965	Terence Boylan (FF)	Patrick Norton (Lab)	Gerard Sweetman (FG)	Brendan Crinion (FF)	4 seats 1961–1969
19th	1969	Terence Boylan (FF)	Paddy Power (FF)	Gerard Sweetman (FG)	3 seats 1969–1981	3 seats 1969–1981
19th	1970 by-election	Terence Boylan (FF)	Paddy Power (FF)	Patrick Malone (FG)	3 seats 1969–1981	3 seats 1969–1981
20th	1973	Joseph Bermingham (Lab)	Paddy Power (FF)	Patrick Malone (FG)	3 seats 1969–1981	3 seats 1969–1981
21st	1977	Joseph Bermingham (Lab)	Paddy Power (FF)	Charlie McCreevy (FF)	3 seats 1969–1981	3 seats 1969–1981
22nd	1981	Joseph Bermingham (Lab)	Paddy Power (FF)	Charlie McCreevy (FF)	Bernard Durkan (FG)	Alan Dukes (FG)
23rd	1982 (Feb)	Joseph Bermingham (Lab)	Paddy Power (FF)	Charlie McCreevy (FF)	Gerry Brady (FF)	Alan Dukes (FG)
24th	1982 (Nov)	Joseph Bermingham (Lab)	Paddy Power (FF)	Charlie McCreevy (FF)	Bernard Durkan (FG)	Alan Dukes (FG)
25th	1987	Emmet Stagg (Lab)	Paddy Power (FF)	Charlie McCreevy (FF)	Bernard Durkan (FG)	Alan Dukes (FG)
26th	1989	Emmet Stagg (Lab)	Seán Power (FF)	Charlie McCreevy (FF)	Bernard Durkan (FG)	Alan Dukes (FG)
27th	1992	Emmet Stagg (Lab)	Seán Power (FF)	Charlie McCreevy (FF)	Bernard Durkan (FG)	Alan Dukes (FG)
28th	1997	Constituency abolished. See Kildare North and Kildare South				
