= Seán Power (politician) =

Irish former politician (born 1960)

Minister of State
- 2008–2009: Communications, Energy and Natural Resources
- 2007–2008: Justice, Equality and Law Reform
- 2004–2007: Health and Children

Teachta Dála
- In office June 1997 – February 2011
- Constituency: Kildare South
- In office June 1989 – May 1997
- Constituency: Kildare

Personal details
- Born: 14 October 1960 (age 65) County Kildare, Ireland
- Party: Fianna Fáil
- Parent: Paddy Power (father)

Seán Power (born 14 October 1960) is an Irish former Fianna Fáil politician. He was a Teachta Dála (TD) for the Kildare South constituency.

Power was born in Caragh, near Naas in County Kildare and was educated locally at the Christian Brothers School in Naas. His father Paddy Power was a TD, MEP and cabinet minister. His brother, J.J. Power is a former Green Party member of Kildare County Council.

He was first elected to Dáil Éireann at the 1989 general election, as a Fianna Fáil TD for the Kildare constituency, retaining his father's seat. He was re-elected at 1992, 1997, 2002 and 2007 general elections. He was a member of Kildare County Council from 1999 to 2004

In 1991, Power was a key member of the so-called "gang of four" which proposed a motion of no confidence in the Taoiseach, and the leader of his party, Charles Haughey. The other members of the group were Noel Dempsey, Liam Fitzgerald and M. J. Nolan. That incident led to Albert Reynolds's first bid for the leadership and to Haughey's eventual resignation in 1992. When Reynolds eventually became Taoiseach, Power was appointed Assistant Chief Whip. He served as a member of the Joint Committees on European Affairs and on the Environment and Local Government.

In Bertie Ahern's 2004 reshuffle, Power was appointed as Minister of State at the Department of Health and Children with special responsibility for Health Promotion. After the 2007 general election he was appointed as Minister of State at the Department of Justice, Equality and Law Reform with special responsibility for Equality.

On 13 May 2008, shortly after Brian Cowen became Taoiseach, he was appointed as Minister of State at the Department of Communications, Energy and Natural Resources with special responsibility for Information Society and Natural Resources. He served in this position until April 2009 when he was dropped in a reshuffle where the number of junior ministers was reduced from 20 to 15.

He lost his seat at the 2011 general election. He was elected to Kildare County Council for the Kildare–Newbridge area in May 2014. He did not contest the 2019 local elections.

== See also ==
- Families in the Oireachtas

Political offices
| Preceded by Ivor Callely; Tim O'Malley | Minister of State at the Department of Health and Children; 2004–2007; With: Tim O'Malley | Succeeded by Pat "the Cope" Gallagher |
| Preceded by Frank Fahey | Minister of State at the Department of Justice, Equality and Law Reform; 2007–2008 | Succeeded by John Moloney |
| Preceded by Tony Killeen | Minister of State at the Department of the Communications, Energy and Natural Resources; 2008–2009 | Succeeded by Conor Lenihan |

| Dáil | Election | Deputy (Party) | Deputy (Party) | Deputy (Party) |
|---|---|---|---|---|
| 4th | 1923 | Hugh Colohan (Lab) | John Conlan (FP) | George Wolfe (CnaG) |
| 5th | 1927 (Jun) | Hugh Colohan (Lab) | Domhnall Ua Buachalla (FF) | George Wolfe (CnaG) |
| 6th | 1927 (Sep) | Hugh Colohan (Lab) | Domhnall Ua Buachalla (FF) | George Wolfe (CnaG) |
| 6th | 1931 by-election | Thomas Harris (FF) | Domhnall Ua Buachalla (FF) | George Wolfe (CnaG) |
| 7th | 1932 | Thomas Harris (FF) | William Norton (Lab) | Sydney Minch (CnaG) |
| 8th | 1933 | Thomas Harris (FF) | William Norton (Lab) | Sydney Minch (CnaG) |
| 9th | 1937 | Constituency abolished. See Carlow–Kildare | | |

| Dáil | Election | Deputy (Party) | Deputy (Party) | Deputy (Party) | Deputy (Party) | Deputy (Party) |
|---|---|---|---|---|---|---|
| 13th | 1948 | William Norton (Lab) | Thomas Harris (FF) | Gerard Sweetman (FG) | 3 seats until 1961 | 3 seats until 1961 |
| 14th | 1951 | William Norton (Lab) | Thomas Harris (FF) | Gerard Sweetman (FG) | 3 seats until 1961 | 3 seats until 1961 |
| 15th | 1954 | William Norton (Lab) | Thomas Harris (FF) | Gerard Sweetman (FG) | 3 seats until 1961 | 3 seats until 1961 |
| 16th | 1957 | William Norton (Lab) | Patrick Dooley (FF) | Gerard Sweetman (FG) | 3 seats until 1961 | 3 seats until 1961 |
| 17th | 1961 | William Norton (Lab) | Patrick Dooley (FF) | Gerard Sweetman (FG) | Brendan Crinion (FF) | 4 seats 1961–1969 |
| 17th | 1964 by-election | Terence Boylan (FF) | Patrick Dooley (FF) | Gerard Sweetman (FG) | Brendan Crinion (FF) | 4 seats 1961–1969 |
| 18th | 1965 | Terence Boylan (FF) | Patrick Norton (Lab) | Gerard Sweetman (FG) | Brendan Crinion (FF) | 4 seats 1961–1969 |
| 19th | 1969 | Terence Boylan (FF) | Paddy Power (FF) | Gerard Sweetman (FG) | 3 seats 1969–1981 | 3 seats 1969–1981 |
| 19th | 1970 by-election | Terence Boylan (FF) | Paddy Power (FF) | Patrick Malone (FG) | 3 seats 1969–1981 | 3 seats 1969–1981 |
| 20th | 1973 | Joseph Bermingham (Lab) | Paddy Power (FF) | Patrick Malone (FG) | 3 seats 1969–1981 | 3 seats 1969–1981 |
| 21st | 1977 | Joseph Bermingham (Lab) | Paddy Power (FF) | Charlie McCreevy (FF) | 3 seats 1969–1981 | 3 seats 1969–1981 |
| 22nd | 1981 | Joseph Bermingham (Lab) | Paddy Power (FF) | Charlie McCreevy (FF) | Bernard Durkan (FG) | Alan Dukes (FG) |
| 23rd | 1982 (Feb) | Joseph Bermingham (Lab) | Paddy Power (FF) | Charlie McCreevy (FF) | Gerry Brady (FF) | Alan Dukes (FG) |
| 24th | 1982 (Nov) | Joseph Bermingham (Lab) | Paddy Power (FF) | Charlie McCreevy (FF) | Bernard Durkan (FG) | Alan Dukes (FG) |
| 25th | 1987 | Emmet Stagg (Lab) | Paddy Power (FF) | Charlie McCreevy (FF) | Bernard Durkan (FG) | Alan Dukes (FG) |
| 26th | 1989 | Emmet Stagg (Lab) | Seán Power (FF) | Charlie McCreevy (FF) | Bernard Durkan (FG) | Alan Dukes (FG) |
| 27th | 1992 | Emmet Stagg (Lab) | Seán Power (FF) | Charlie McCreevy (FF) | Bernard Durkan (FG) | Alan Dukes (FG) |
| 28th | 1997 | Constituency abolished. See Kildare North and Kildare South | | | | |

| Dáil | Election | Deputy (Party) | Deputy (Party) | Deputy (Party) | Deputy (Party) |
|---|---|---|---|---|---|
| 28th | 1997 | Jack Wall (Lab) | Alan Dukes (FG) | Seán Power (FF) | 3 seats 1997–2020 |
| 29th | 2002 | Jack Wall (Lab) | Seán Ó Fearghaíl (FF) | Seán Power (FF) | 3 seats 1997–2020 |
| 30th | 2007 | Jack Wall (Lab) | Seán Ó Fearghaíl (FF) | Seán Power (FF) | 3 seats 1997–2020 |
| 31st | 2011 | Jack Wall (Lab) | Seán Ó Fearghaíl (FF) | Martin Heydon (FG) | 3 seats 1997–2020 |
| 32nd | 2016 | Fiona O'Loughlin (FF) | Seán Ó Fearghaíl (FF) | Martin Heydon (FG) | 3 seats 1997–2020 |
| 33rd | 2020 | Cathal Berry (Ind.) | Seán Ó Fearghaíl (FF) | Martin Heydon (FG) | Patricia Ryan (SF) |
| 34th | 2024 | Mark Wall (Lab) | Seán Ó Fearghaíl (FF) | Martin Heydon (FG) | Shónagh Ní Raghallaigh (SF) |
