= Patsy Lawlor =

Irish politician (1933–1997)

Senator
- In office 8 October 1981 – 13 May 1982
- Constituency: Cultural and Educational Panel

Personal details
- Born: Patricia Broughal; 17 March 1933 Kill, County Kildare, Ireland
- Died: 19 December 1997 (aged 64) Dublin, Ireland
- Party: Fine Gael
- Spouse: Tony Lawlor
- Children: 4, including Anthony

Patricia Lawlor (née Broughal; 17 March 1933 – 19 December 1997) was an Irish politician, nurse and businesswoman.

== Politics ==
She was elected as Fine Gael member to Kildare County Council at the 1974 local elections for the Naas electoral area; and re-elected at the 1979 local elections. From the 1985 local elections onwards, she was re-elected as an independent member. In 1979, she became the first woman to chair Kildare County Council and Kildare VEC. A member of the General Council of County Councils from 1979, she was its chairperson from 1981 to 1982.

She was an unsuccessful Fine Gael candidate at the 1981 general election and February 1982 general elections for the Kildare constituency. She was elected to Seanad Éireann on the Cultural and Educational Panel in 1981 as a Fine Gael member. She lost her seat at the 1983 Seanad election.

At the 1991 local elections, she was elected as an independent member to Kildare County Council for the Naas electoral area. She was an unsuccessful independent candidate at the 1992 general election for the Kildare constituency.

== Personal life ==
She was educated locally and at St Mary's secondary school in Naas, she trained as a nurse. She was deeply involved in the social and economic life of County Kildare, where she lived and worked for most of her life, once describing herself as "born, bred, and buttered" in Kill. She married Tony Lawlor, a farmer and member of a catering family in Naas; they had four children.

She was a member of the Irish Countrywomen's Association (ICA) for many years. She was a founder member of the Kill guild of the ICA in 1961, was national president from 1976 to 1979.

In 1986 she reopened her family's pub, the Old House in Kill, and managed it with her son. She died from cancer at St Vincent's Nursing Home, Dublin, on 19 December 1997, aged 64.

Her son Anthony Lawlor was elected as a Fine Gael Teachta Dála (TD) for the Kildare North constituency at the 2011 general election.

== See also ==
- Families in the Oireachtas
