= Terence Boylan (politician) =

Irish politician (1910–1991)

Teachta Dála
- In office February 1964 – February 1973
- Constituency: Kildare

Personal details
- Born: 10 September 1910 County Kildare, Ireland
- Died: 10 January 1991 (aged 80) County Kildare, Ireland
- Party: Fianna Fáil

Terence Boylan (10 September 1910 – 10 January 1991) was an Irish Fianna Fáil politician and businessman. He was first elected to Dáil Éireann as a Fianna Fáil Teachta Dála (TD) for the Kildare constituency at the 1964 by-election caused by the death of William Norton of the Labour Party. He was re-elected at the 1965 and 1969 general elections but lost his seat at the 1973 general election.

Dáil	Election	Deputy (Party)	Deputy (Party)	Deputy (Party)
4th	1923	Hugh Colohan (Lab)	John Conlan (FP)	George Wolfe (CnaG)
5th	1927 (Jun)	Hugh Colohan (Lab)	Domhnall Ua Buachalla (FF)	George Wolfe (CnaG)
6th	1927 (Sep)	Hugh Colohan (Lab)	Domhnall Ua Buachalla (FF)	George Wolfe (CnaG)
6th	1931 by-election	Thomas Harris (FF)	Domhnall Ua Buachalla (FF)	George Wolfe (CnaG)
7th	1932	Thomas Harris (FF)	William Norton (Lab)	Sydney Minch (CnaG)
8th	1933	Thomas Harris (FF)	William Norton (Lab)	Sydney Minch (CnaG)
9th	1937	Constituency abolished. See Carlow–Kildare		

Dáil	Election	Deputy (Party)	Deputy (Party)	Deputy (Party)	Deputy (Party)	Deputy (Party)
13th	1948	William Norton (Lab)	Thomas Harris (FF)	Gerard Sweetman (FG)	3 seats until 1961	3 seats until 1961
14th	1951	William Norton (Lab)	Thomas Harris (FF)	Gerard Sweetman (FG)	3 seats until 1961	3 seats until 1961
15th	1954	William Norton (Lab)	Thomas Harris (FF)	Gerard Sweetman (FG)	3 seats until 1961	3 seats until 1961
16th	1957	William Norton (Lab)	Patrick Dooley (FF)	Gerard Sweetman (FG)	3 seats until 1961	3 seats until 1961
17th	1961	William Norton (Lab)	Patrick Dooley (FF)	Gerard Sweetman (FG)	Brendan Crinion (FF)	4 seats 1961–1969
17th	1964 by-election	Terence Boylan (FF)	Patrick Dooley (FF)	Gerard Sweetman (FG)	Brendan Crinion (FF)	4 seats 1961–1969
18th	1965	Terence Boylan (FF)	Patrick Norton (Lab)	Gerard Sweetman (FG)	Brendan Crinion (FF)	4 seats 1961–1969
19th	1969	Terence Boylan (FF)	Paddy Power (FF)	Gerard Sweetman (FG)	3 seats 1969–1981	3 seats 1969–1981
19th	1970 by-election	Terence Boylan (FF)	Paddy Power (FF)	Patrick Malone (FG)	3 seats 1969–1981	3 seats 1969–1981
20th	1973	Joseph Bermingham (Lab)	Paddy Power (FF)	Patrick Malone (FG)	3 seats 1969–1981	3 seats 1969–1981
21st	1977	Joseph Bermingham (Lab)	Paddy Power (FF)	Charlie McCreevy (FF)	3 seats 1969–1981	3 seats 1969–1981
22nd	1981	Joseph Bermingham (Lab)	Paddy Power (FF)	Charlie McCreevy (FF)	Bernard Durkan (FG)	Alan Dukes (FG)
23rd	1982 (Feb)	Joseph Bermingham (Lab)	Paddy Power (FF)	Charlie McCreevy (FF)	Gerry Brady (FF)	Alan Dukes (FG)
24th	1982 (Nov)	Joseph Bermingham (Lab)	Paddy Power (FF)	Charlie McCreevy (FF)	Bernard Durkan (FG)	Alan Dukes (FG)
25th	1987	Emmet Stagg (Lab)	Paddy Power (FF)	Charlie McCreevy (FF)	Bernard Durkan (FG)	Alan Dukes (FG)
26th	1989	Emmet Stagg (Lab)	Seán Power (FF)	Charlie McCreevy (FF)	Bernard Durkan (FG)	Alan Dukes (FG)
27th	1992	Emmet Stagg (Lab)	Seán Power (FF)	Charlie McCreevy (FF)	Bernard Durkan (FG)	Alan Dukes (FG)
28th	1997	Constituency abolished. See Kildare North and Kildare South				
