= Thomas Harris (Irish politician) =

Irish politician (1895–1974)

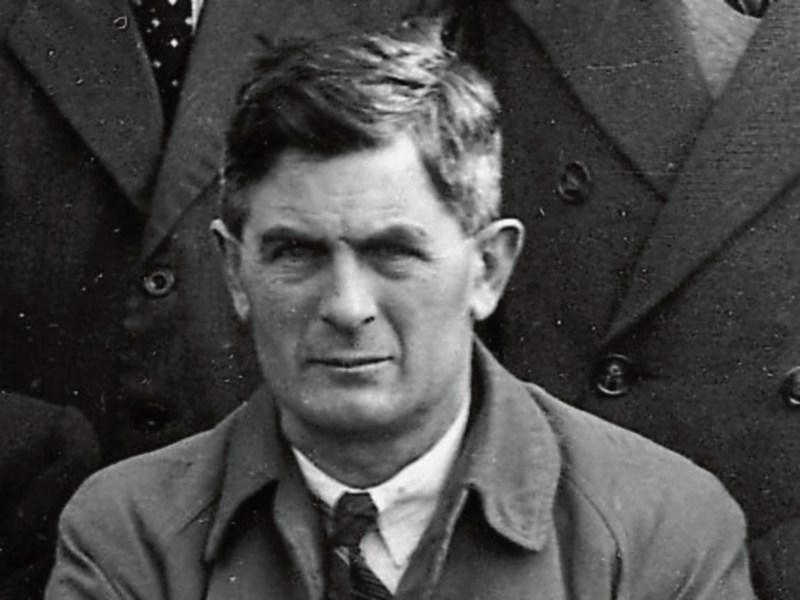
- Harris in 1950

Teachta Dála
- In office July 1937 – February 1948
- Constituency: Carlow–Kildare
- In office February 1948 – March 1957
- In office June 1931 – July 1937
- Constituency: Kildare

Personal details
- Born: 1895 County Kildare, Ireland
- Died: 18 February 1974 (aged 78–79) County Kildare, Ireland
- Party: Fianna Fáil
- Relatives: Matthew Harris

Thomas Harris (1895 – 18 February 1974) was an Irish Fianna Fáil politician and revolutionary.

== Revolutionary period ==
As a young man he joined Conradh na Gaeilge in Prosperous, and subsequently joined the Irish Republican Brotherhood. Harris fought with the Maynooth contingent in 1916 Easter Rising in Dublin. He was wounded by gunshot wound to right foot, arrested and interned until August 1916. He was captain of the Prosperous Company in 1917 and during the Irish War of Independence served as Battalion Commandant of 2 Battalion (North Kildare), Irish Republican Army (IRA). He took part in destruction of vacated RIC barracks and ambushes up until his arrest in November 1920.

Harris was released in December 1921 during the Truce period and was promoted in early 1922 to Brigade Commandant of 7 Brigade (Kildare), 1 Eastern Division, IRA. Taking the anti Treaty side in the Irish Civil War, Harris was captured by National forces on 27 June 1922 (the night before the Four Courts attack) but escaped from Newbridge Camp, County Kildare in October 1922. He resumed active service but resigned from his position as Brigade Commandant in February 1923. Remaining on the run, Harris was captured in September 1923 and interned for about one month. He later awarded a pension by the Irish government under the Military Service Pensions Act, 1934 for his service with the Irish Volunteers and the IRA between 1916 and 1923.

== Politics ==
A farmer, Harris was first elected to the Kildare constituency in a by-election in June 1931 caused by the death of Labour Party TD, Hugh Colohan. With just over 40% of the vote Harris defeated Cumann na nGaedheal candidate John Curton and future Labour Party leader, William Norton. He served as a member of Dáil Éireann for the next 26 years representing the constituencies of Kildare from 1931 to 1937, Carlow–Kildare from 1937 to 1948, and Kildare again from 1948 to 1957. He lost his seat at the 1957 general election and retired from politics.

== Personal life ==
A native of Cloncurry, he was raised in Prosperous, County Kildare by his aunt Elizabeth Tierney. Harris was related to Matthew Harris, MP for Galway East from 1885 to 1890.

Dáil	Election	Deputy (Party)	Deputy (Party)	Deputy (Party)	Deputy (Party)
9th	1937	William Norton (Lab)	Thomas Harris (FF)	Francis Humphreys (FF)	Sydney Minch (FG)
10th	1938	William Norton (Lab)	Thomas Harris (FF)	Francis Humphreys (FF)	James Hughes (FG)
11th	1943	William Norton (Lab)	Thomas Harris (FF)	Francis Humphreys (FF)	James Hughes (FG)
12th	1944	William Norton (Lab)	Thomas Harris (FF)	Francis Humphreys (FF)	James Hughes (FG)
13th	1948	Constituency abolished. See Carlow–Kilkenny and Kildare			

Dáil	Election	Deputy (Party)	Deputy (Party)	Deputy (Party)
4th	1923	Hugh Colohan (Lab)	John Conlan (FP)	George Wolfe (CnaG)
5th	1927 (Jun)	Hugh Colohan (Lab)	Domhnall Ua Buachalla (FF)	George Wolfe (CnaG)
6th	1927 (Sep)	Hugh Colohan (Lab)	Domhnall Ua Buachalla (FF)	George Wolfe (CnaG)
6th	1931 by-election	Thomas Harris (FF)	Domhnall Ua Buachalla (FF)	George Wolfe (CnaG)
7th	1932	Thomas Harris (FF)	William Norton (Lab)	Sydney Minch (CnaG)
8th	1933	Thomas Harris (FF)	William Norton (Lab)	Sydney Minch (CnaG)
9th	1937	Constituency abolished. See Carlow–Kildare		

Dáil	Election	Deputy (Party)	Deputy (Party)	Deputy (Party)	Deputy (Party)	Deputy (Party)
13th	1948	William Norton (Lab)	Thomas Harris (FF)	Gerard Sweetman (FG)	3 seats until 1961	3 seats until 1961
14th	1951	William Norton (Lab)	Thomas Harris (FF)	Gerard Sweetman (FG)	3 seats until 1961	3 seats until 1961
15th	1954	William Norton (Lab)	Thomas Harris (FF)	Gerard Sweetman (FG)	3 seats until 1961	3 seats until 1961
16th	1957	William Norton (Lab)	Patrick Dooley (FF)	Gerard Sweetman (FG)	3 seats until 1961	3 seats until 1961
17th	1961	William Norton (Lab)	Patrick Dooley (FF)	Gerard Sweetman (FG)	Brendan Crinion (FF)	4 seats 1961–1969
17th	1964 by-election	Terence Boylan (FF)	Patrick Dooley (FF)	Gerard Sweetman (FG)	Brendan Crinion (FF)	4 seats 1961–1969
18th	1965	Terence Boylan (FF)	Patrick Norton (Lab)	Gerard Sweetman (FG)	Brendan Crinion (FF)	4 seats 1961–1969
19th	1969	Terence Boylan (FF)	Paddy Power (FF)	Gerard Sweetman (FG)	3 seats 1969–1981	3 seats 1969–1981
19th	1970 by-election	Terence Boylan (FF)	Paddy Power (FF)	Patrick Malone (FG)	3 seats 1969–1981	3 seats 1969–1981
20th	1973	Joseph Bermingham (Lab)	Paddy Power (FF)	Patrick Malone (FG)	3 seats 1969–1981	3 seats 1969–1981
21st	1977	Joseph Bermingham (Lab)	Paddy Power (FF)	Charlie McCreevy (FF)	3 seats 1969–1981	3 seats 1969–1981
22nd	1981	Joseph Bermingham (Lab)	Paddy Power (FF)	Charlie McCreevy (FF)	Bernard Durkan (FG)	Alan Dukes (FG)
23rd	1982 (Feb)	Joseph Bermingham (Lab)	Paddy Power (FF)	Charlie McCreevy (FF)	Gerry Brady (FF)	Alan Dukes (FG)
24th	1982 (Nov)	Joseph Bermingham (Lab)	Paddy Power (FF)	Charlie McCreevy (FF)	Bernard Durkan (FG)	Alan Dukes (FG)
25th	1987	Emmet Stagg (Lab)	Paddy Power (FF)	Charlie McCreevy (FF)	Bernard Durkan (FG)	Alan Dukes (FG)
26th	1989	Emmet Stagg (Lab)	Seán Power (FF)	Charlie McCreevy (FF)	Bernard Durkan (FG)	Alan Dukes (FG)
27th	1992	Emmet Stagg (Lab)	Seán Power (FF)	Charlie McCreevy (FF)	Bernard Durkan (FG)	Alan Dukes (FG)
28th	1997	Constituency abolished. See Kildare North and Kildare South				
