= Patrick Norton (Irish politician) =

Irish former politician (born 1928)

Senator
- In office 5 November 1969 – 1 June 1973
- Constituency: Administrative Panel

Teachta Dála
- In office April 1965 – June 1969
- Constituency: Kildare

Personal details
- Born: 1928 (age 97–98) County Kildare, Ireland
- Party: Labour Party (1964–1967); Independent (1967–1969); Fianna Fáil (1969–1973)
- Parent: William Norton (father)

Patrick Norton (born 1928) is an Irish former politician. He first stood for election at the Kildare by-election on 19 February 1964 but he was not elected. The by-election was caused by the death of his father William Norton, former Tánaiste and Labour Party leader from 1932 to 1960. Patrick Norton was elected to Dáil Éireann as a Labour Party Teachta Dála (TD) for the Kildare constituency at the 1965 general election.

A businessman and property owner, with no previous record of party activism, he strongly opposed Labour's ideological swing to the left in the mid-1960s under Brendan Corish's leadership. After being attacked at the party conference regarding a court case condemning houses that he owned, he left the party in December 1967, insisting it had been captured by "a small but vocal group of fellow travellers".

In February 1969, he joined Fianna Fáil. On joining, he accused Labour of embracing "Cuban socialism". He stood as a Fianna Fáil candidate at the 1969 general election but lost his seat. He was subsequently elected to the 12th Seanad on the Administrative Panel as a Fianna Fáil senator. He also stood as a Fianna Fáil candidate at the 1973 general election for the Dublin South-East constituency but was not elected.

== See also ==
- Families in the Oireachtas

Dáil	Election	Deputy (Party)	Deputy (Party)	Deputy (Party)
4th	1923	Hugh Colohan (Lab)	John Conlan (FP)	George Wolfe (CnaG)
5th	1927 (Jun)	Hugh Colohan (Lab)	Domhnall Ua Buachalla (FF)	George Wolfe (CnaG)
6th	1927 (Sep)	Hugh Colohan (Lab)	Domhnall Ua Buachalla (FF)	George Wolfe (CnaG)
6th	1931 by-election	Thomas Harris (FF)	Domhnall Ua Buachalla (FF)	George Wolfe (CnaG)
7th	1932	Thomas Harris (FF)	William Norton (Lab)	Sydney Minch (CnaG)
8th	1933	Thomas Harris (FF)	William Norton (Lab)	Sydney Minch (CnaG)
9th	1937	Constituency abolished. See Carlow–Kildare		

Dáil	Election	Deputy (Party)	Deputy (Party)	Deputy (Party)	Deputy (Party)	Deputy (Party)
13th	1948	William Norton (Lab)	Thomas Harris (FF)	Gerard Sweetman (FG)	3 seats until 1961	3 seats until 1961
14th	1951	William Norton (Lab)	Thomas Harris (FF)	Gerard Sweetman (FG)	3 seats until 1961	3 seats until 1961
15th	1954	William Norton (Lab)	Thomas Harris (FF)	Gerard Sweetman (FG)	3 seats until 1961	3 seats until 1961
16th	1957	William Norton (Lab)	Patrick Dooley (FF)	Gerard Sweetman (FG)	3 seats until 1961	3 seats until 1961
17th	1961	William Norton (Lab)	Patrick Dooley (FF)	Gerard Sweetman (FG)	Brendan Crinion (FF)	4 seats 1961–1969
17th	1964 by-election	Terence Boylan (FF)	Patrick Dooley (FF)	Gerard Sweetman (FG)	Brendan Crinion (FF)	4 seats 1961–1969
18th	1965	Terence Boylan (FF)	Patrick Norton (Lab)	Gerard Sweetman (FG)	Brendan Crinion (FF)	4 seats 1961–1969
19th	1969	Terence Boylan (FF)	Paddy Power (FF)	Gerard Sweetman (FG)	3 seats 1969–1981	3 seats 1969–1981
19th	1970 by-election	Terence Boylan (FF)	Paddy Power (FF)	Patrick Malone (FG)	3 seats 1969–1981	3 seats 1969–1981
20th	1973	Joseph Bermingham (Lab)	Paddy Power (FF)	Patrick Malone (FG)	3 seats 1969–1981	3 seats 1969–1981
21st	1977	Joseph Bermingham (Lab)	Paddy Power (FF)	Charlie McCreevy (FF)	3 seats 1969–1981	3 seats 1969–1981
22nd	1981	Joseph Bermingham (Lab)	Paddy Power (FF)	Charlie McCreevy (FF)	Bernard Durkan (FG)	Alan Dukes (FG)
23rd	1982 (Feb)	Joseph Bermingham (Lab)	Paddy Power (FF)	Charlie McCreevy (FF)	Gerry Brady (FF)	Alan Dukes (FG)
24th	1982 (Nov)	Joseph Bermingham (Lab)	Paddy Power (FF)	Charlie McCreevy (FF)	Bernard Durkan (FG)	Alan Dukes (FG)
25th	1987	Emmet Stagg (Lab)	Paddy Power (FF)	Charlie McCreevy (FF)	Bernard Durkan (FG)	Alan Dukes (FG)
26th	1989	Emmet Stagg (Lab)	Seán Power (FF)	Charlie McCreevy (FF)	Bernard Durkan (FG)	Alan Dukes (FG)
27th	1992	Emmet Stagg (Lab)	Seán Power (FF)	Charlie McCreevy (FF)	Bernard Durkan (FG)	Alan Dukes (FG)
28th	1997	Constituency abolished. See Kildare North and Kildare South				
