= George Wolfe (Irish politician) =

Irish politician (1860–1941)

Teachta Dála
- In office August 1923 – February 1932
- Constituency: Kildare

Personal details
- Born: 16 December 1859 Ballymore Eustace, County Kildare, Ireland
- Died: 1 December 1941 (aged 81) Forenaghts, County Kildare, Ireland
- Party: Cumann na nGaedheal
- Spouse: Emily Leeman (née Smethurst) (m. 1888; died 1910)
- Children: 1
- Education: Trinity College Dublin; Royal Military College, Sandhurst

Military service
- Branch/service: British Army
- Years of service: 1882–1890
- Rank: Major
- Unit: Royal Irish Fusiliers; 8th King's Royal Irish Hussars
- Battles/wars: Anglo-Egyptian War: Battle of Tell El Kebir

George Wolfe (16 December 1859 – 1 December 1941) was an Irish Cumann na nGaedheal politician, soldier, landowner, antiquarian, and farmer. He served for nine years as a Teachta Dála (TD) for the Kildare constituency.

== Early and personal life ==
George Wolfe was born 16 December 1859 at Bishopland, Ballymore Eustace, County Kildare, the younger son among two sons and one daughter of Theobald George Samuel Wolfe (1815–1872), landowner, of Bishopland and Forenaghts, Naas, County Kildare, and his wife Elizabeth Wolfe (née Ball) In 1870, his father had inherited the extensive Forenaghts estate.

Wolfe was educated at Rathmines School, Dublin; Trinity College Dublin; and the Royal Military College, Sandhurst. He succeeded as head of the family at Forenaghts on the death of his elder brother, Richard Wolfe in 1885.

In 1888, he married Emily Leeman (née Smethurst) (d. 1910), only child of Richard Smethurst of Elterbeck Hall, Chorley, Lancashire, and widow of Joseph Johnson Leeman, MP for York. They had one daughter.

== Army career ==
In 1882, he was commissioned lieutenant in the Royal Irish Fusiliers, and served at the Battle of Tell El Kebir in the Anglo-Egyptian War (being awarded a medal with clasp and the Khedive's Star), and in the 1884–1885 Sudanese war. After service with the 8th King's Royal Irish Hussars (1885–1890), he retired from the army with the rank of major.

== Political career ==
Wolfe was served on Kildare County Council from 1899 to 1920; and was its vice-chairman from 1911 to 1920. He was elected to Dáil Éireann on his first attempt, at the 1923 general election, becoming the only Cumann na nGaedheal TD from the 3-seat Kildare constituency in the 4th Dáil. He was re-elected at the June 1927 general election and again at the September 1927 general election, but did not stand at the 1932 general election.

Dáil	Election	Deputy (Party)	Deputy (Party)	Deputy (Party)
4th	1923	Hugh Colohan (Lab)	John Conlan (FP)	George Wolfe (CnaG)
5th	1927 (Jun)	Hugh Colohan (Lab)	Domhnall Ua Buachalla (FF)	George Wolfe (CnaG)
6th	1927 (Sep)	Hugh Colohan (Lab)	Domhnall Ua Buachalla (FF)	George Wolfe (CnaG)
6th	1931 by-election	Thomas Harris (FF)	Domhnall Ua Buachalla (FF)	George Wolfe (CnaG)
7th	1932	Thomas Harris (FF)	William Norton (Lab)	Sydney Minch (CnaG)
8th	1933	Thomas Harris (FF)	William Norton (Lab)	Sydney Minch (CnaG)
9th	1937	Constituency abolished. See Carlow–Kildare		

Dáil	Election	Deputy (Party)	Deputy (Party)	Deputy (Party)	Deputy (Party)	Deputy (Party)
13th	1948	William Norton (Lab)	Thomas Harris (FF)	Gerard Sweetman (FG)	3 seats until 1961	3 seats until 1961
14th	1951	William Norton (Lab)	Thomas Harris (FF)	Gerard Sweetman (FG)	3 seats until 1961	3 seats until 1961
15th	1954	William Norton (Lab)	Thomas Harris (FF)	Gerard Sweetman (FG)	3 seats until 1961	3 seats until 1961
16th	1957	William Norton (Lab)	Patrick Dooley (FF)	Gerard Sweetman (FG)	3 seats until 1961	3 seats until 1961
17th	1961	William Norton (Lab)	Patrick Dooley (FF)	Gerard Sweetman (FG)	Brendan Crinion (FF)	4 seats 1961–1969
17th	1964 by-election	Terence Boylan (FF)	Patrick Dooley (FF)	Gerard Sweetman (FG)	Brendan Crinion (FF)	4 seats 1961–1969
18th	1965	Terence Boylan (FF)	Patrick Norton (Lab)	Gerard Sweetman (FG)	Brendan Crinion (FF)	4 seats 1961–1969
19th	1969	Terence Boylan (FF)	Paddy Power (FF)	Gerard Sweetman (FG)	3 seats 1969–1981	3 seats 1969–1981
19th	1970 by-election	Terence Boylan (FF)	Paddy Power (FF)	Patrick Malone (FG)	3 seats 1969–1981	3 seats 1969–1981
20th	1973	Joseph Bermingham (Lab)	Paddy Power (FF)	Patrick Malone (FG)	3 seats 1969–1981	3 seats 1969–1981
21st	1977	Joseph Bermingham (Lab)	Paddy Power (FF)	Charlie McCreevy (FF)	3 seats 1969–1981	3 seats 1969–1981
22nd	1981	Joseph Bermingham (Lab)	Paddy Power (FF)	Charlie McCreevy (FF)	Bernard Durkan (FG)	Alan Dukes (FG)
23rd	1982 (Feb)	Joseph Bermingham (Lab)	Paddy Power (FF)	Charlie McCreevy (FF)	Gerry Brady (FF)	Alan Dukes (FG)
24th	1982 (Nov)	Joseph Bermingham (Lab)	Paddy Power (FF)	Charlie McCreevy (FF)	Bernard Durkan (FG)	Alan Dukes (FG)
25th	1987	Emmet Stagg (Lab)	Paddy Power (FF)	Charlie McCreevy (FF)	Bernard Durkan (FG)	Alan Dukes (FG)
26th	1989	Emmet Stagg (Lab)	Seán Power (FF)	Charlie McCreevy (FF)	Bernard Durkan (FG)	Alan Dukes (FG)
27th	1992	Emmet Stagg (Lab)	Seán Power (FF)	Charlie McCreevy (FF)	Bernard Durkan (FG)	Alan Dukes (FG)
28th	1997	Constituency abolished. See Kildare North and Kildare South				
