= Gerard Sweetman =

Irish politician (1908–1970)

Minister for Finance
- In office 2 June 1954 – 12 February 1957
- Taoiseach: John A. Costello
- Preceded by: Seán MacEntee
- Succeeded by: James Ryan

Teachta Dála
- In office February 1948 – 28 January 1970
- Constituency: Kildare

Senator
- In office 8 September 1943 – 21 April 1948
- Constituency: Agricultural Panel

Personal details
- Born: Hugh Gerard Sweetman; 20 June 1908 Ballinteer, Dublin, Ireland
- Died: 28 January 1970 (aged 61) Monasterevin, County Kildare, Ireland
- Party: Fine Gael
- Spouse: Rosalind Mansfield (m. 1941)
- Children: 3
- Relatives: Roger Sweetman (uncle); Edmund Sweetman (cousin)
- Education: Trinity College Dublin; King's Inns

Hugh Gerard Sweetman (20 June 1908 – 28 January 1970) was an Irish Fine Gael politician who served as Minister for Finance from 1954 to 1957. He served as a Teachta Dála (TD) for the Kildare constituency from 1948 to 1970. He was a Senator for the Agricultural Panel from 1943 to 1948.

== Family and childhood ==
Hugh Gerard Sweetman was born on 20 June 1908. His father, James Sweetman, was a practising barrister, and the family's return for the 1911 census shows that they employed three servants at their Lower Baggot Street home. His mother Agnes was the daughter of Sir George Fottrell of North Great George's Street, Dublin. His brothers, Séamus, George, and Denis, served in World War II; Denis was killed on 23 May 1940 at Boulogne and Séamus was awarded an MBE in 1945.

James' brother, Roger Sweetman, was elected to the First Dáil representing Wexford North and was one of the first TDs to publicly call for a negotiated settlement to the Irish War of Independence.

He was educated at the Downside School in England. He completed his studies at Trinity College Dublin and went on to qualify as a solicitor in 1930.

== Early political career ==
Sweetman's first brush with politics came with his involvement with the Blueshirts: He was a member of the League of Youth, one of their youth wings, and was elected to Blueshirt's national council in August 1935. As the Blueshirts dissipated, Sweetman folded into the newly formed Fine Gael. Three weeks after his 29th birthday, Sweetman contested the 1937 general election. His target was the four-seater Carlow–Kildare constituency. Out of a field of 7 candidates, Sweetman came in sixth with 8.5% of the vote.

He did not contest the 1938 general election but ran again in 1943, and once again failed to secure election. He secured a Seanad seat in weeks that followed, and remained in the upper house through the 1944 election, until finally, with the creation of a separate Kildare constituency, he won a Dáil seat at the 1948 general election.

The 1948 general election returned the first inter-party government under Taoiseach John A. Costello. This coalition represented an 'anybody-but-Fianna-Fáil' gathering from across the political spectrum, and the newest Kildare TD sat on the backbenches until the government fell in 1951.

A second inter-party government took office in June 1954 with Sweetman promoted to Minister for Finance.

In Professor Tom Garvin's review of the 1950s 'News from a New Republic', he comes in for praise as a moderniser and Garvin places him with a cross-party group including Daniel Morrissey of Fine Gael and William Norton of the Labour Party as well as Seán Lemass of Fianna Fáil who were pushing a modernising agenda

Sweetman also served as a member of Kildare County Council, including a term as chairman of the Council in the late 1940s.

== Ministerial career ==
At the age of 45 years old, Sweetman inherited a national economy that was in crisis. Unemployment was at 421,000; over 100,000 people had left agriculture during the previous 8 years; the country was seeing a level of emigration unknown since the famine.

Sweetman differed in his thinking from the protectionist policies espoused by Éamon de Valera since the 1930s. Rather than focusing on a self-sufficient Ireland, Sweetman enacted policies that would make Ireland a net exporter.

In his first budget in 1955, he introduced a scheme whereby a tax exemption was provided for exported goods. He also established the Prize Bonds programme as a means of reducing the national debt. This debt was worrying in the mid-1950s. Two major bond issues were placed during Sweetman's tenure, for £20 million and £12 million. These were large sums at a time when an average worker entered the tax net with an annual salary of just £533.

On 30 May 1956, Sweetman's greatest initiative as minister was the appointment of a 39-year-old civil servant named Ken Whitaker to the position of Secretary-General of the Department of Finance. This was a revolutionary step, as it did not follow the convention of promotion based on time served. Whitaker's time at the department has been seen as instrumental in the economic development of the country, and a 2001 RTÉ contest named him 'Irishman of the 20th Century'. Whitaker continued in office under the Fianna Fáil government elected in 1957, and his seminal "First Programme for Economic Expansion" published in 1958 laid the foundations for economic growth in the 1960s.

== Later career ==
For Sweetman, this brief period of government would not be repeated, as he would remain in opposition for the rest of his life. Upon the retirement of Richard Mulcahy as leader of Fine Gael, Sweetman played a significant role in James Dillon's campaign to become the party's latest leader, fending off both John A. Costello and Liam Cosgrave, opposing the former due to his failure to commit to the role full-time and the latter due to antagonism between the two while in government.

During the 1960s, Fine Gael itself witnessed a major transformation. This internal revolution culminated in the 'Just Society' document produced by Declan Costello. The distinctly social democrat flavour of the document was very much at odds with Sweetman's deeply conservative views. However, the support of Liam Cosgrave and Garret FitzGerald ensured that the document was adopted as the party's manifesto for the 1965 general election, with Sweetman, Dillon and the rest of the conservative wing capitulating after realising they were outnumbered. Nevertheless, he succeeded in having most of the policy gutted prior to the election.

Following Dillon's retirement as leader after his defeat in the 1965 Irish general election, Sweetman aided his former rival, Liam Cosgrave, in becoming Fine Gael's new leader to prevent Declan Costello from becoming a credible challenger. However, the favour was not repaid, with Cosgrave removing Sweetman as Fine Gael's spokesperson on Finance, moving him to Agriculture, having been dissuaded from removing him from the front bench entirely by Dillon and Tom O'Higgins.

While both O'Higgins and FitzGerald exercised considerable influence on the new leader, Sweetman became the dominant influence on Cosgrave following the former's excellent performance as director of elections during the 1966 Irish presidential election. This influence led to Sweetman successfully convincing Cosgrave to oppose proportional representation during the 1968 Irish constitutional referendums, which put him at odds with the rest of his party who successfully campaigned against the amendment, severely damaging his credibility.

In his last election, in June 1969, Sweetman was again returned to the Dáil for a seventh successive term. The election left only a handful of seats between Fianna Fáil and the opposition. However, Sweetman was far from pleased with this result, looking to replace Cosgrave with a new leader. According to Magill, his plan was to install Tom Fitzpatrick, a moderate figure acceptable to both Fine Gael's liberal and conservative wings, as an interim leader, until Sweetman's preferred candidate, John Kelly was elected to the Dáil.

== Death ==
Sweetman was known for his high-speed style of driving. On 28 January 1970, while returning from a business meeting on the continent, he had travelled down to Silvermines in County Tipperary for another business meeting, and it was on the return journey that he lost control of his vehicle near Monasterevin, County Kildare and died.

Speaking at the first session of the Dáil that followed, Taoiseach Jack Lynch offered a sincere and moving tribute to the late Deputy. He spoke of a TD who "commanded respect and attention", especially in matters of finance; a "gifted parliamentarian who loved the cut-and-thrust of debate" and who was as "fair an opponent as he was formidable". He noted a career cut short: "Through his tragic and untimely death, Dáil Éireann and Irish public life have suffered a grievous loss. That loss will be felt all the more because of his great impact on, and contribution to, Irish political life".

Political offices
Preceded by Seán MacEntee	Minister for Finance; 1954–1957	Succeeded by James Ryan

Dáil	Election	Deputy (Party)	Deputy (Party)	Deputy (Party)
4th	1923	Hugh Colohan (Lab)	John Conlan (FP)	George Wolfe (CnaG)
5th	1927 (Jun)	Hugh Colohan (Lab)	Domhnall Ua Buachalla (FF)	George Wolfe (CnaG)
6th	1927 (Sep)	Hugh Colohan (Lab)	Domhnall Ua Buachalla (FF)	George Wolfe (CnaG)
6th	1931 by-election	Thomas Harris (FF)	Domhnall Ua Buachalla (FF)	George Wolfe (CnaG)
7th	1932	Thomas Harris (FF)	William Norton (Lab)	Sydney Minch (CnaG)
8th	1933	Thomas Harris (FF)	William Norton (Lab)	Sydney Minch (CnaG)
9th	1937	Constituency abolished. See Carlow–Kildare		

Dáil	Election	Deputy (Party)	Deputy (Party)	Deputy (Party)	Deputy (Party)	Deputy (Party)
13th	1948	William Norton (Lab)	Thomas Harris (FF)	Gerard Sweetman (FG)	3 seats until 1961	3 seats until 1961
14th	1951	William Norton (Lab)	Thomas Harris (FF)	Gerard Sweetman (FG)	3 seats until 1961	3 seats until 1961
15th	1954	William Norton (Lab)	Thomas Harris (FF)	Gerard Sweetman (FG)	3 seats until 1961	3 seats until 1961
16th	1957	William Norton (Lab)	Patrick Dooley (FF)	Gerard Sweetman (FG)	3 seats until 1961	3 seats until 1961
17th	1961	William Norton (Lab)	Patrick Dooley (FF)	Gerard Sweetman (FG)	Brendan Crinion (FF)	4 seats 1961–1969
17th	1964 by-election	Terence Boylan (FF)	Patrick Dooley (FF)	Gerard Sweetman (FG)	Brendan Crinion (FF)	4 seats 1961–1969
18th	1965	Terence Boylan (FF)	Patrick Norton (Lab)	Gerard Sweetman (FG)	Brendan Crinion (FF)	4 seats 1961–1969
19th	1969	Terence Boylan (FF)	Paddy Power (FF)	Gerard Sweetman (FG)	3 seats 1969–1981	3 seats 1969–1981
19th	1970 by-election	Terence Boylan (FF)	Paddy Power (FF)	Patrick Malone (FG)	3 seats 1969–1981	3 seats 1969–1981
20th	1973	Joseph Bermingham (Lab)	Paddy Power (FF)	Patrick Malone (FG)	3 seats 1969–1981	3 seats 1969–1981
21st	1977	Joseph Bermingham (Lab)	Paddy Power (FF)	Charlie McCreevy (FF)	3 seats 1969–1981	3 seats 1969–1981
22nd	1981	Joseph Bermingham (Lab)	Paddy Power (FF)	Charlie McCreevy (FF)	Bernard Durkan (FG)	Alan Dukes (FG)
23rd	1982 (Feb)	Joseph Bermingham (Lab)	Paddy Power (FF)	Charlie McCreevy (FF)	Gerry Brady (FF)	Alan Dukes (FG)
24th	1982 (Nov)	Joseph Bermingham (Lab)	Paddy Power (FF)	Charlie McCreevy (FF)	Bernard Durkan (FG)	Alan Dukes (FG)
25th	1987	Emmet Stagg (Lab)	Paddy Power (FF)	Charlie McCreevy (FF)	Bernard Durkan (FG)	Alan Dukes (FG)
26th	1989	Emmet Stagg (Lab)	Seán Power (FF)	Charlie McCreevy (FF)	Bernard Durkan (FG)	Alan Dukes (FG)
27th	1992	Emmet Stagg (Lab)	Seán Power (FF)	Charlie McCreevy (FF)	Bernard Durkan (FG)	Alan Dukes (FG)
28th	1997	Constituency abolished. See Kildare North and Kildare South				
