= Candidates in the 2020 Irish general election =

This page lists the candidates in the 2020 Irish general election.

== Candidates ==
Elected candidates are shown in bold text.

*: Outgoing TD
#: Member of the 25th Seanad
§: Returned automatically without standing for election as outgoing Ceann Comhairle, in accordance with Article 16.6 of the Constitution of Ireland.

Constituency	Fine Gael	Fianna Fáil	Sinn Féin	Labour	Solidarity–PBP	Green	Social Democrats	Independent	Others
Carlow–Kilkenny	Pat Deering; Patrick O'Neill; **John Paul Phelan**	Bobby Aylward; **John McGuinness**; **Jennifer Murnane O'Connor**	**Kathleen Funchion**	Denis Hynes	Adrienne Wallace (PBP)	**Malcolm Noonan**		Alan Hayes; Angela Ray	Helena Byrne (Renua); Melissa O'Neill (IFP)
Cavan–Monaghan	**Heather Humphreys**; Sandra McIntyre; T.P. O'Reilly	Robbie Gallagher; **Brendan Smith**; **Niamh Smyth**	**Matt Carthy**; **Pauline Tully**	Liam van der Spek	Emmett Smith (PBP)	Tate Donnelly		Joseph Duffy	Sarah O'Reilly (Aontú)
Clare	Pat Breen; **Joe Carey**; Martin Conway	**Cathal Crowe**; Timmy Dooley; Rita McInerney	**Violet-Anne Wynne**		Theresa O'Donohue (PBP)	Róisín Garvey		David Barrett; Trudy Leyden; **Michael McNamara**; Joseph Woulfe	Michael Leahy (IFP); Conor O'Brien (Renua)
Cork East	Pa O'Driscoll; **David Stanton**	**James O'Connor**; Kevin O'Keeffe	**Pat Buckley**	**Seán Sherlock**		Liam Quaide		Thomas Kiely; Mary Linehan-Foley; Shane O'Grady; Sean O'Leary	Conor Hannon (Aontú); Frank Shinnick (IFP)
Cork North–Central	**Colm Burke**; Lorraine O'Neill	Tony Fitzgerald; Sandra Murphy; **Pádraig O'Sullivan**	**Thomas Gould**	John Maher	**Mick Barry** (S)	Oliver Moran	Sinéad Halpin	T J Hogan; Ger Keohane; Diarmaid Ó Cadhla; Stephen O'Donovan; Ken O'Flynn; Sean O'Leary	James Coughlan (WP); Finian Toomey (Aontú)
Cork North–West	**Michael Creed**; John Paul O'Shea	**Aindrias Moynihan**; **Michael Moynihan**				Colette Finn	Ciarán McCarthy	Seán O'Leary	Becky Kealy (Aontú); Tara Nic Domhnaill (IFP)
Cork South–Central	Jerry Buttimer; **Simon Coveney**	**Micheál Martin**; **Michael McGrath**	**Donnchadh Ó Laoghaire**	Ciara Kennedy	Bobby Murray Walsh (PBP)	Lorna Bogue	Patricia O'Dwyer	Paudie Dineen; John Donohoe; William O'Brien; Sean O'Leary	Anna Daly (Aontú)
Cork South–West	Karen Coakley; Tim Lombard	Margaret Murphy O'Mahony; **Christopher O'Sullivan**	Paul Hayes		Kevin O'Connor (PBP)	Bernadette Connolly	**Holly Cairns**	Alan Coleman; **Michael Collins**; Sean O'Leary	Mairéad Ruane (Aontú)
Donegal	Martin Harley; **Joe McHugh**	Pat "the Cope" Gallagher; **Charlie McConalogue**	**Pearse Doherty**; **Pádraig Mac Lochlainn**			Michael White		Peter Casey; Niall McConnell; Arthur McGuinness; John O'Donnell; **Thomas Pringle**	Mary T. Sweeney (Aontú)
Dublin Bay North	**Richard Bruton**; Catherine Noone	**Seán Haughey**; Deirdre Heney	**Denise Mitchell**	**Aodhán Ó Ríordáin**	Bernard Mulvany (PBP); Michael O'Brien (S)	David Healy	**Cian O'Callaghan**	Michael Burke; Conor Creaven; Brian Garrigan; John Lyons; Linda McEvoy; Sean O'Leary	Ben Gilroy (IFP); Proinsias O'Conarain (Aontú)
Dublin Bay South	**Eoghan Murphy**; Kate O'Connell	**Jim O'Callaghan**	**Chris Andrews**	Kevin Humphreys	Annette Mooney (PBP)	**Eamon Ryan**	Sarah Durcan	Norma Burke; Peter Dooley; Mannix Flynn; John Keigher; Sean O'Leary	Jacqui Gilborne (Renua); Ben Scallan (IFP)
Dublin Central	**Paschal Donohoe**; Deirdre Duffy	Mary Fitzpatrick	**Mary Lou McDonald**	Joe Costello	Gillian Brien (PBP); Rita Harrold (S)	**Neasa Hourigan**	**Gary Gannon**	Christy Burke; Patrick Clohessy; Sarah Louise Mulligan; Sean O'Leary; Dolores Webster	Ian Noel Smyth (Aontú); Éilis Ryan (WP)
Dublin Fingal	**Alan Farrell**; James Reilly	Lorraine Clifford-Lee; **Darragh O'Brien**	**Louise O'Reilly**	**Duncan Smith**	Terry Kelleher (S); John Uwhumiakpor (PBP)	**Joe O'Brien**	Paul Mulville	Tony Murphy; Gemma O'Doherty; Sandra Sweetman	Dean Mulligan (I4C); Alistair Smith (UP)
Dublin Mid–West	Vicki Casserly; **Emer Higgins**	John Curran; Catriona McClean	**Eoin Ó Broin**; **Mark Ward**	Joanna Tuffy	**Gino Kenny** (PBP)	Peter Kavanagh		Paul Gogarty; Francis Timmons	David Gardiner (WP)
Dublin North–West	Noel Rock	**Paul McAuliffe**	**Dessie Ellis**	Andrew Montague	Conor Reddy (PBP)	Caroline Conroy	**Róisín Shortall**	Ian Croft; Niall Fitzgerald	Stephen Redmond (NP)
Dublin Rathdown	**Josepha Madigan**; **Neale Richmond**	Deirdre Conroy; Shay Brennan	Sorcha Nic Cormaic	Lettie McCarthy	Eoghan Ó Ceannabháin (PBP)	**Catherine Martin**		Patrick Noonan; Shane Ross	Liam Coughlan (Aontú)
Dublin South–Central	Catherine Byrne	Catherine Ardagh	**Aengus Ó Snodaigh**	Rebecca Moynihan	**Bríd Smith** (PBP)	**Patrick Costello**	Tara Deacy	Robert Foley; Alan Kerrigan; Richard Murray; Sean O'Leary	**Joan Collins** (I4C); Serina Irvine (NP)
Dublin South–West	**Colm Brophy**; Ellen O'Malley Dunlop	**John Lahart**; Charlie O'Connor; Deirdre O'Donovan	**Seán Crowe**	Ciarán Ahern	Sandra Fay (S); **Paul Murphy** (RISE)	**Francis Noel Duffy**	Carly Bailey	Mick Duff; Colm O'Keeffe; Katherine Zappone	Philip Dwyer (NP); Ann Marie Condren (Renua)
Dublin West	Emer Currie; **Leo Varadkar**	**Jack Chambers**	**Paul Donnelly**	Joan Burton	Ruth Coppinger (S)	**Roderic O'Gorman**	Aengus Ó Maoláin	Peter Casey; Sean O'Leary; Stephen O'Loughlin	Edward Mac Manus (Aontú)
Dún Laoghaire	**Jennifer Carroll MacNeill**; Mary Mitchell O'Connor; Barry Ward	**Cormac Devlin**; Mary Hanafin	Shane O'Brien	Juliet O'Connell	**Richard Boyd Barrett** (PBP)	**Ossian Smyth**	Dave Quinn	John Waters	Con Óg Ó Laoghaire (IFP); Mairéad Tóibín (Aontú)
Galway East	**Ciarán Cannon**; Peter Roche	Donagh Killilea; **Anne Rabbitte**	Louis O'Hara	Marian Spelman		Eoin Madden	Peter Reid	**Seán Canney**; David O'Reilly	Deaglán Mac Canna (Renua); Martin Ward (Aontú)
Galway West	Seán Kyne; **Hildegarde Naughton**	Ollie Crowe; **Éamon Ó Cuív**	**Mairéad Farrell**	Níall McNelis	Conor Burke (S); Joe Loughnane (PBP)	Pauline O'Reilly	Niall Ó Tuathail	**Catherine Connolly**; Mike Cubbard; **Noel Grealish**; Daragh O'Flaherty	Cormac Ó Corcoráin (Aontú)
Kerry	**Brendan Griffin**; Mike Kennelly	John Brassil; **Norma Foley**; Norma Moriarty	**Pa Daly**			Cleo Murphy		Ted Cronin; **Danny Healy-Rae**; **Michael Healy-Rae**; Sean O'Leary	John Bowler (IFP); Sonny Foran (Aontú)
Kildare North	**Bernard Durkan**; Anthony Lawlor	**James Lawless**; Frank O'Rourke	**Réada Cronin**	Emmet Stagg	Paul Mahon (PBP)	Vincent P. Martin	**Catherine Murphy**	David Monaghan; Wayne Swords	Séamus Ó Riain (Renua)
Kildare South	**Martin Heydon**	Suzanne Doyle; **Seán Ó Fearghaíl**; Fiona O'Loughlin	**Patricia Ryan**	Mark Wall	Róisín Uí Bhroin (PBP)	Ronan Maher	Linda Hayden	**Cathal Berry**; Fiona McLoughlin Healy	Anita Mhic Gib (Aontú)
Laois–Offaly	Marcella Corcoran Kennedy; **Charles Flanagan**	**Barry Cowen**; Pauline Flanagan; **Seán Fleming**; Peter Ormond	**Brian Stanley**	Noel Tuohy	Stephen Tynan (PBP)	Pippa Hackett		John Leahy; **Carol Nolan**	John Daly (NP); Noel O'Rourke (Renua); Ken Smollen (IDP)
Limerick City	Maria Byrne; **Kieran O'Donnell**	James Collins; **Willie O'Dea**	**Maurice Quinlivan**	Jan O'Sullivan	Mary Cahillane (S)	**Brian Leddin**	Jenny Blake	Frankie Daly	Rebecca Barrett (NP); Michael Ryan (Aontú)
Limerick County	Tom Neville; **Patrick O'Donovan**	Michael Collins; **Niall Collins**	Séighin Ó Ceallaigh			Claire Keating		Con Cremin; Robert O'Donnell; **Richard O'Donoghue**	John Dalton (Renua); Cristín Ní Mhaoldhomhnaigh (NP); Conor O'Donoghue (Aontú)
Longford–Westmeath	**Peter Burke**; Micheál Carrigy; Gabrielle McFadden	**Joe Flaherty**; **Robert Troy**	**Sorca Clarke**	Alan Mangan	Dom Parker (S); Barbara Smyth (PBP)	Louise Heavin		Donal Jackson; Anna Kavanagh; Frank Kilbride; Kevin "Boxer" Moran	James Reynolds (NP)
Louth	John McGahon; **Fergus O'Dowd**	Declan Breathnach; James Byrne	**Imelda Munster**; **Ruairí Ó Murchú**	**Ged Nash**	Audrey Fergus (PBP)	Mark Dearey		Topanga Bird; David Bradley; Albert Byrne; **Peter Fitzpatrick**	Cathal Ó Murchú (IFP); Eamon Sweeney (Renua)
Mayo	**Alan Dillon**; Michelle Mulherin; **Michael Ring**	**Dara Calleary**; Lisa Chambers	**Rose Conway-Walsh**	Kamal Uddin	Joe Daly (PBP)	Saoirse McHugh		Gráinne de Barra; Seán Forkin; Gerry Loftus; Stephen Manning	Paul Lawless (Aontú); Daithí Ó Fallamháin (IFP)
Meath East	Regina Doherty; **Helen McEntee**	**Thomas Byrne**; Deirdre Geraghty-Smith	Darren O'Rourke	Annie Hoey	Andrew Keegan (PBP)	Seán McCabe		Joe Bonner; Sharon Keogan	Seamus McDonagh (WP); Emer Tóibín (Aontú)
Meath West	**Damien English**; Noel French; Sarah Reilly	Shane Cassells	**Johnny Guirke**			Séamus McMenamin	Ronan Moore		John Malone (Renua); **Peadar Tóibín** (Aontú)
Roscommon–Galway	Aisling Dolan	Orla Leyden; Eugene Murphy	**Claire Kerrane**		Kenny Tynan (PBP)	Julie O'Donoghue		Thomas Fallon; **Michael Fitzmaurice**; **Denis Naughten**	Paul Hanley (NP); James Hope (Aontú)
Sligo–Leitrim	**Frank Feighan**; Thomas Walsh	Shane Ellis; **Marc MacSharry**; Eamon Scanlon	**Martin Kenny**	Nessa Cosgrove	Gino O'Boyle (PBP)	Bláithin Gallagher		James Conway; **Marian Harkin**; Mary O'Donnell; Bernie O'Hara; John Perry; Sean Wynne	Declan Bree (I4C); Anne McCloskey (Aontú); Paul McWeeney (NP); Oisín O'Dwyer (Renua)
Tipperary	Garret Ahearn; Mary Newman Julian	**Jackie Cahill**; Sandra Farrell; Imelda Goldsboro	**Martin Browne**	**Alan Kelly**		Rob O'Donnell		Joe Hannigan; Séamus Healy; **Michael Lowry**; **Mattie McGrath**; Marese Skehan	Dolores Cahill (IFP)
Waterford	John Cummins; Damien Geoghegan	**Mary Butler**; Eddie Mulligan	**David Cullinane**	John Pratt	Úna Dunphy (PBP)	**Marc Ó Cathasaigh**		Bernadette Philips; **Matt Shanahan**	Rónan Cleary (Aontú)
Wexford	Michael W. D'Arcy; **Paul Kehoe**	**James Browne**; Malcolm Byrne; Lisa McDonald; Michael Sheehan	**Johnny Mythen**	**Brendan Howlin**	Deirdre Wadding (PBP)	Paula Roseingrave		Ger Carthy; Bart Murphy; **Verona Murphy**	Jim Codd (Aontú); Seanie O'Shea (I4C)
Wicklow	Andrew Doyle; **Simon Harris**; Billy Timmins	Pat Casey; **Stephen Donnelly**	**John Brady**	Paul O'Brien	Sharon Briggs (PBP)	**Steven Matthews**	**Jennifer Whitmore**	Joe Behan; Valerie Cox; Tom Dunne; Anthony FitzGerald; Charlie Keddy; William King; John Larkin; John Snell	Seamus Connor (Aontú); Eileen Gunning (NP)
