= 2014 Kildare County Council election =

Part of the 2014 Irish local elections

← 2009	23 May 2014	2019 →

All 40 seats to Kildare County Council 21 seats needed for a majority
	First party	Second party	Third party
Party	Fianna Fáil	Fine Gael	Labour
Seats won	12	9	5
Seat change	+6	-	-1
	Fourth party	Fifth party
Party	Sinn Féin	Independent
Seats won	5	9
Seat change	+5	+5
- Map showing the area of Kildare County Council
Council control after election
TBD

An election to all 40 seats on Kildare County Council took place on 23 May 2014 as part of the 2014 Irish local elections, an increase from 25 seats at the 2009 election. County Kildare was divided into five local electoral areas (LEAs) to elect councillors for a five-year term of office on the electoral system of proportional representation by means of the single transferable vote (PR-STV). In addition, the town councils of Athy, Leixlip, Naas and Newbridge were all abolished.

In recognition of its major population growth in recent times Kildare was allocated 15 additional council seats. This helped to insulate both government parties somewhat from anti-government hostility that lead to seat losses in other counties. Fine Gael returned 9 seats, as they did in 2009 and Labour returned with 5 councillors, a loss of 1 seat in the Kildare-Newbridge LEA. Fianna Fáil emerged as the big winners doubling their seats to 12 and becoming the largest party. The party won 3 seats in each of Kildare-Newbridge, Maynooth and in Naas. Sinn Féin won a seat in each LEA, returning to County Hall for the first time since 1999. Independents also gained 5 seats to have a total membership of 9.

== Results by party ==
Party	Seats	±	1st pref	FPv%	±%
Fianna Fáil	12	+6	16,530	26.4	
Fine Gael	9	-	13,111	20.9	
Labour	5	-1	8,359	13.4	
Sinn Féin	5	+5	7,494	11.9	
Independent	9	+5	14,207	22.7	
Total	40	+15	61,837	100.0	—

== Results by local electoral area ==
*: Outgoing councillor.

=== Athy ===
Athy: 6 seats
Party	Candidate	FPv%	Count						
Party	Candidate	FPv%	1	2	3	4	5	6	7
Fianna Fáil	Martin Miley, Jnr	17.12	1,747						
Labour	Mark Wall	15.01	1,531						
Fianna Fáil	Mark Dalton	13.47	1,374	1,499					
Labour	Aoife Breslin	11.95	1,219	1,241	1,377	1,434	1,449	1,470	
Fine Gael	Ivan Keatley	11.61	1,184	1,274	1,521				
Fine Gael	Richard O'Rourke	8.92	910	918	980	984	1,030	1,033	1,079
Sinn Féin	Thomas Redmond	8.27	844	859	895	902	904	910	1,563
Sinn Féin	Ger Kelly	7.97	813	828	863	868	868	879	
Fine Gael	Richard Daly	5.69	580	594					
Electorate: 22,014 Valid: 10,202 (46.34%) Spoilt: 196 Quota: 1,458 Turnout: 10,398 (47.23%)

=== Celbridge–Leixlip ===
Celbridge-Leixlip: 7 seats
Party	Candidate	FPv%	Count											
Party	Candidate	FPv%	1	2	3	4	5	6	7	8	9	10	11	12
Fianna Fáil	Frank O'Rourke	15.31	1,814											
Independent	Anthony Larkin	12.16	1,441											
Sinn Féin	Ide Cussen	8.01	949	969	990	1,013	1,025	1,026	1,073	1,099	1,135	1,183	1,238	1,244
Independent	Bernard Caldwell	7.93	940	945	977	989	991	992	1,065	1,183	1,288	1,485		
Labour	Kevin Byrne	7.11	842	893	903	918	974	974	1,024	1,104	1,123	1,133	1,198	1,231
Fine Gael	Joe Neville	6.52	773	781	793	797	981	982	1,008	1,093	1,194	1,347	1,674	
Independent	Brendan Young	6.23	738	763	783	849	872	875	997	1,026	1,062	1,184	1,340	1,387
Labour	Shane Griffin	6.14	727	768	771	805	868	868	913	984	1,018	1,032	1,139	1,178
Green	Shane Fitzgerald	5.84	692	701	719	732	743	745	768	803	885	995		
Independent	Denis McCarthy	5.20	616	619	645	688	690	693	728	762	819			
Labour	Colm Purcell	4.32	512	518	528	528	545	545	550					
Independent	Michael Beirne	3.63	430	446	475	519	541	541						
Fianna Fáil	Gráinne Whelan	3.61	428	524	538	543	555	555	571	604				
Fine Gael	Philip Slattery	3.38	401	425	428	439								
Independent	Peter Kavanagh	2.37	281	291	308									
Independent	James Devaney	1.57	186	189										
Independent	Jean Berry	0.65	77	80										
Electorate: 27,070 Valid: 11,847 (43.76%) Spoilt: 111 Quota: 1,481 Turnout: 11,958 (44.17%)

=== Kildare-Newbridge ===
Kildare-Newbridge: 9 seats
Party	Candidate	FPv%	Count																
Party	Candidate	FPv%	1	2	3	4	5	6	7	8	9	10	11	12	13	14	15	16	17
Fianna Fáil	Fiona O'Loughlin	12.45	1,786																
Fianna Fáil	Suzanne Doyle	10.47	1,502																
Fine Gael	Fiona McLoughlin-Healy	9.87	1,415	1,445															
Sinn Féin	Mark Lynch	9.02	1,293	1,308	1,315	1,318	1,319	1,325	1,336	1,351	1,360	1,378	1,412	1,440					
Independent	Joanne Pender	7.15	1,026	1,042	1,067	1,073	1,073	1,084	1,112	1,138	1,183	1,203	1,263	1,315	1,442				
Independent	Paddy Kennedy	6.67	957	981	988	991	993	1,017	1,043	1,070	1,111	1,132	1,165	1,243	1,295	1,341	1,343	1,482	
Fianna Fáil	Seán Power	6.19	888	1,003	1,009	1,026	1,027	1,030	1,050	1,060	1,081	1,1103	1,127	1,163	1,187	1,239	1,240	1,315	1,321
Fine Gael	Mark Stafford	5.68	814	887	890	895	896	899	909	913	916	942	957	1,533					
Sinn Féin	Damian Molyneaux	4.76	682	693	698	699	699	706	711	738	746	756	772	796	846	866	867		
Fine Gael	Michael Nolan, Jnr	4.64	666	678	681	682	682	693	709	720	736	757	765	787	798	920	920	972	977
Independent	Willie Crowley	3.85	552	559	563	564	565	571	584	603	666	683	694	753	863	874	876	1,020	1,055
Fine Gael	Mary Donnelly	3.60	516	527	527	535	536	543	546	547	549	592	623	639	677				
Independent	Declan Crowe	2.59	372	376	382	387	387	388	392	397	403	421	492	581					
Independent	Murty Aspell	2.50	359	365	375	376	377	384	402	428	454	472	484						
Independent	John (Gusher) Gleeson	2.32	333	336	338	347	347	351	355	365	372	388							
Independent	Morgan McCabe	1.81	259	266	270	270	270	272	287	296									
Labour	Francis Browne	1.48	212	215	217	222	222	304	308	314	316								
Independent	Seamus Finn	1.43	205	208	219	220	220	228	230										
Labour	Willie Hamilton	1.38	198	200	201	202	203												
Independent	Ray O'Brien	1.37	196	204	208	208	209	212											
Independent	Jason Turner	0.76	109	110															
Electorate: 32,598 Valid: 14,340 (43.99%) Spoilt: 197 Quota: 1,435 Turnout: 14,537 (44.59%)

=== Maynooth ===
Maynooth: 9 seats
Party	Candidate	FPv%	Count									
Party	Candidate	FPv%	1	2	3	4	5	6	7	8	9	10
Fine Gael	Brendan Weld	13.82	1,701									
Independent	Padraig McEvoy	13.56	1,668									
Sinn Féin	Réada Cronin	10.49	1,291									
Independent	Teresa Murray	7.74	952	984	1,045	1,050	1,136	1,268				
Labour	John McGinley	7.53	927	936	950	952	956	961	1,142	1,144	1,151	1,188
Fianna Fáil	Naoise Ó Cearúil	7.48	920	939	963	966	970	980	1,000	1,060	1,065	1,089
Fianna Fáil	Paul Ward	6.93	853	897	921	923	925	961	975	1,015	1,018	1,046
Fine Gael	Tim Durkan	5.83	717	856	889	891	895	911	954	977	981	1,325
Fianna Fáil	Daragh Fitzpatrick	5.38	662	722	771	774	789	796	818	1,113	1,116	1,250
People Before Profit	Martin Grehan	5.08	625	640	688	708	731	797	829	852	866	899
Fine Gael	Seamus Langan	4.87	599	688	700	702	747	757	781	858	859	
Fianna Fáil	Ben Doyle	4.27	529	539	552	556	583	592	611			
Labour	Julie McNamara	2.64	325	356	437	438	446	458				
Independent	John Paul Gannon	2.32	286	297	340	351	392					
Independent	Joan McGuire	2.06	254	261	296	301						
Electorate: 28,237 Valid: 12,305 (43.86%) Spoilt: 163 Quota: 1,232 Turnout: 12,468 (44.44%)

=== Naas ===
Naas: 9 seats
Party	Candidate	FPv%	Count											
Party	Candidate	FPv%	1	2	3	4	5	6	7	8	9	10	11	12
Fianna Fáil	James Lawless	16.15	2,123											
Sinn Féin	Sorcha O'Neill	12.34	1,622											
Independent	Seamie Moore	9.94	1,307	1,361										
Fine Gael	Darren Scully	9.23	1,213	1,291	1,305	1,308	1,321							
Fianna Fáil	Robert Power	7.29	954	1,174	1,198	1,209	1,218	1,231	1,241	1,283	1,344			
Fianna Fáil	Willie Callaghan	7.23	950	1,119	1,137	1,148	1,159	1,185	1,197	1,304	1,361			
Fine Gael	Billy Hillis	6.25	822	839	846	849	850	862	872	893	1,040	1,047	1,053	1,101
Labour	Anne Breen	6.21	816	846	863	866	877	890	906	1,074	1,194	1,208	1,213	1,533
Fine Gael	Fintan Brett	6.09	800	843	848	851	852	863	871	885	1,019	1,027	1,038	1,145
Fine Gael	Jacinta O'Sullivan	4.51	593	623	635	637	640	651	661	694				
Labour	Fergus Carpenter	4.0	526	631	642	643	645	652	665	721	754	757	759	
Labour	Ger Dunne	3.99	524	539	556	556	561	566	575					
Independent	Paddy Horan	2.26	297	308	355	359	415	542	706	739	763	765	770	807
Direct Democracy	Martin Byrne	1.72	226	241	300	301	326	348						
Independent	Francis James O'Rourke	1.40	184	197	234	237	304							
Independent	Cathal Spelman	1.38	182	194	233	234								
Electorate: 30,335 Valid: 13,143 (43.33%) Spoilt: 171 Quota: 1,315 Turnout: 13,314 (43.89%)

== Changes ==
=== Co-options ===
Party	Outgoing	LEA	Reason	Date	Co-optee
Fianna Fáil	Willie Callaghan	Naas	Death.	27 January 2015	Deborah Callaghan
Independent	Willie Crowley	Kildare-Newbridge	Died after sustaining injuries in a hit and run incident.	14 March 2016	Morgan McCabe
Fianna Fáil	James Lawless	Naas	Elected to the 32nd Dáil at the 2016 general election.	14 March 2016	Carmel Brady
Fianna Fáil	Frank O'Rourke	Celbridge-Leixlip	Elected to the 32nd Dáil at the 2016 general election.	14 March 2016	Michael Coleman
Fianna Fáil	Fiona O'Loughlin	Kildare-Newbridge	Elected to the 32nd Dáil at the 2016 general election.	14 March 2016	Murty Aspell
Fianna Fáil	Mark Dalton	Athy	Resigned due to expenses scandal.	26 November 2018	Brian Dooley

=== Changes in affiliation ===
Name	LEA	Elected as	New affiliation	Date
Mark Dalton	Athy	Fianna Fáil	Independent	16 October 2014
Sorcha O'Neill	Naas	Sinn Féin	Independent	21 April 2017
Fiona McLoughlin-Healy	Kildare-Newbridge	Fine Gael	Independent	9 March 2018
Íde Cussen	Celbridge-Leixlip	Sinn Féin	Independent	21 November 2018
