= 2019 Kildare County Council election =

Part of the 2019 Irish local elections

- 24 May 2019

All 40 seats on Kildare County Council 21 seats needed for a majority
	First party	Second party	Third party
Party	Fianna Fáil	Fine Gael	Labour
Seats won	12	11	5
Seat change	Steady	▲2	Steady
	Fourth party	Fifth party	Sixth party
Party	Social Democrats	Green	Sinn Féin
Seats won	4	3	1
Seat change	▲4	▲3	▼4
	Seventh party
Party	Independent
Seats won	4
Seat change	▼5
- Results by local electoral area

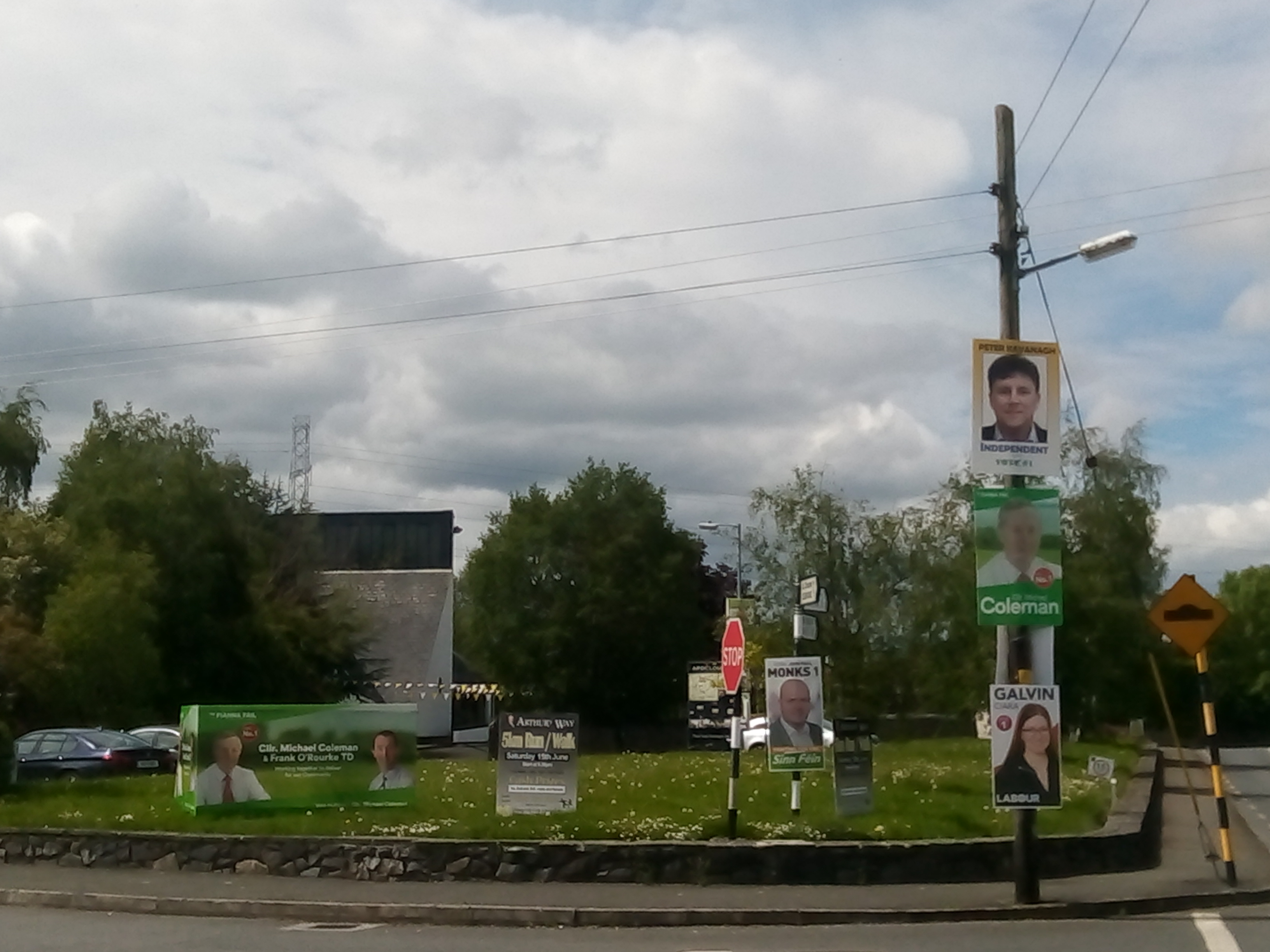
Posters in Ardclough (part of the Celbridge LEA)

An election to all 40 seats on Kildare County Council was held on 24 May 2019 as part of the 2019 Irish local elections. County Kildare was divided into eight local electoral areas (LEAs) to elect councillors for a five-year term of office on the electoral system of proportional representation by means of the single transferable vote (PR-STV).

== Boundary review ==
Following a recommendation of the 2018 Boundary Committee, the boundaries of the LEAs were altered from those used in the 2014 elections. Its terms of reference required no change in the total number of councillors but set a lower maximum LEA size of seven councillors, exceeded by three of the five 2014 LEAs. Other changes were necessitated by population shifts revealed by the 2016 census.

== Overview ==
Fianna Fáil remained the largest party with 12 seats although they saw a slight reduction in vote share. Fine Gael increased their vote share by over 2% and also gained an extra two seats to have a total of 11. Labour retained their five seats on the council. The Social Democrats benefitted from the presence of Catherine Murphy in the county and saw four gains, with the party winning seats in Clane, Leixlip, Naas and Newbridge. The Green Party returned to the council with three seats, its three gains coming from Celbridge, Maynooth and Naas.

Sinn Féin lost four seats overall as its vote share fell by 67% and the party only came home with one seat. Partly due to retirements Independents saw a net loss of five seats.

== Results by party ==
Party	Seats	±	1st pref	FPv%	±%
Fianna Fáil	12	Steady	17,614	25.67	▼0.73
Fine Gael	11	▲2	16,964	24.72	▲3.82
Labour	5	Steady	8,774	12.79	▼0.61
Social Democrats	4	▲4	4,600	6.70	New
Green	3	▲3	4,945	7.21	▲6.09
Sinn Féin	1	▼4	3,060	4.46	▼7.44
Aontú	0	Steady	636	0.93	New
People Before Profit	0	Steady	314	0.46	▼0.55
Renua	0	Steady	190	0.28	New
Independent	4	▼5	11,522	16.79	▼5.91
Total	40	Steady	68,619	100.00	

== Results by local electoral area ==
*: Outgoing councillor elected in 2014.
†: Outgoing councillor coopted subsequent to the 2014 election.

=== Athy ===
Athy: 5 seats
Party	Candidate	FPv%	Count							
Party	Candidate	FPv%	1	2	3	4	5	6	7	8
Labour	Mark Wall (Note: See change below.)	26.97%	2,489							
Fine Gael	Ivan Keatley	15.99%	1,476	1,536	1,580					
Labour	Aoife Breslin	15.47%	1,428	2,026						
Fianna Fáil	Brian Dooley	10.43%	963	1,033	1,137	1,165	1,172	1,216	1,389	1,586
Fianna Fáil	Emmet Kane	6.08%	561	590	608	618	621	684		
Fianna Fáil	Veralouise Behan	5.89%	544	591	631	663	664	766	1,044	1,216
Sinn Féin	Thomas Redmond	5.88%	543	604	719	785	791	871	912	1,003
Independent	Tony McNamee	5.76%	532	542	554	601	605			
Fine Gael	Ciara O'Keeffe	4.80%	443	496	573	622	634	719	774	
Social Democrats	Samantha Kenny	2.72%	251	271	316					
Electorate: 19,330 Valid: 9,230 Spoilt: 219 Quota: 1,539 Turnout: 9,449 (48.88%)

=== Celbridge ===
Celbridge: 4 seats
Party	Candidate	FPv%	Count							
Party	Candidate	FPv%	1	2	3	4	5	6	7	8
Fianna Fáil	Michael Coleman	22.38%	1,493							
Independent	Íde Cussen	12.62%	842	877	902	927	981	1,075	1,151	1,276
Green	Vanessa Liston	12.20%	814	832	839	864	905	952	1,093	1,297
Independent	Brendan Young	10.64%	710	726	751	792	837	898	978	1,146
Labour	Ciara Galvin	9.94%	663	683	691	708	736	786	971	1,155
Social Democrats	Stephen Marken	9.75%	650	665	680	706	730	765	840	
Fine Gael	Philip Slattery	8.73%	582	606	618	625	656	682		
Independent	Michael Beirne	4.71%	314	326	341	355	395			
Independent	Peter Kavanagh	4.03%	269	277	297	306				
Sinn Féin	John Paul Monks	2.71%	181	186	192					
Independent	Tony Murray	2.28%	152	157						
Electorate: 15,383 Valid: 6,670 Spoilt: 133 Quota: 1,335 Turnout: 6,803 (44.22%)

=== Clane ===
Clane: 5 seats
Party	Candidate	FPv%	Count									
Party	Candidate	FPv%	1	2	3	4	5	6	7	8	9	10
Fine Gael	Brendan Weld	15.10%	1,255	1,269	1,310	1,338	1,393					
Fianna Fáil	Daragh Fitzpatrick	14.12%	1,173	1,181	1,208	1,366	1,399					
Independent	Pádraig McEvoy	13.45%	1,118	1,137	1,179	1,220	1,309	1,381	1,385	1,387		
Social Democrats	Aidan Farrelly	12.79%	1,063	1,084	1,113	1,147	1,209	1,326	1,331	1,332	1,745	
Fine Gael	Brendan Wyse	10.25%	852	861	889	905	922	944	945	948	1,032	1,119
Fine Gael	Seamus Langan	8.80%	731	740	762	778	784	803	803	803	857	913
Green	Eoin Hallissey	7.22%	600	622	636	664	713	781	784	785		
Sinn Féin	Marc Gibbs	4.60%	382	393	415	427	445					
Fianna Fáil	Daniel Keenan	4.21%	350	361	372							
Aontú	Una O'Connor	3.81%	317	354	382	394						
Independent	Thomas Hogan	3.36%	279	289								
Renua	Séamus Ó Riain	2.29%	190									
Electorate: 18,527 Valid: 8,310 Spoilt: 168 Quota: 1,386 Turnout: 8,478 (45.76%)

=== Kildare ===
Kildare: 5 seats
Party	Candidate	FPv%	Count						
Party	Candidate	FPv%	1	2	3	4	5	6	7
Fianna Fáil	Suzanne Doyle	24.50%	1,847						
Fianna Fáil	Anne Connolly	16.48%	1,242	1,482					
Fine Gael	Kevin Duffy	14.62%	1,102	1,147	1,173	1,350			
Fine Gael	Mark Stafford	13.07%	985	1,090	1,124	1,161	1,299		
Sinn Féin	Patricia Ryan	9.02%	680	708	721	874	1,006	1,081	1,096
Independent	Declan Crowe	8.90%	671	753	797	853	1,029	1,047	1,074
Green	Colette Newman	6.79%	512	573	603	673			
Labour	Paul Hutchinson	6.62%	499	528	549				
Electorate: 17,272 Valid: 7,538 Spoilt: 161 Quota: 1,257 Turnout: 7,699 (44.58%)

=== Leixlip ===
Leixlip: 3 seats
Party	Candidate	FPv%	Count				
Party	Candidate	FPv%	1	2	3	4	5
Fine Gael	Joe Neville	25.54%	1,596				
Fianna Fáil	Bernard Caldwell	16.91%	1,057	1,066	1,105	1,369	1,574
Social Democrats	Nuala Killeen	16.00%	1,000	1,004	1,135	1,226	1,498
Independent	Anthony Larkin	13.74%	859	867	962	1,051	1,234
Fianna Fáil	Valerie Colton	10.22%	639	643	669		
Labour	Mairéad Beades	10.03%	627	633	707	816	
Green	Jason W. Kenny	2.96%	185	186			
Sinn Féin	Anthony Doyle	2.38%	149	149			
Independent	Sean Gill	1.34%	84	84			
Independent	Michael Reidy	0.86%	54	55			
Electorate: 13,174 Valid: 6,250 Spoilt: 86 Quota: 1,563 Turnout: 6,336 (48.09%)

=== Maynooth ===
Maynooth: 5 seats
Party	Candidate	FPv%	Count			
Party	Candidate	FPv%	1	2	3	4
Fianna Fáil	Naoise Ó Cearúil	16.40%	1,341	1,405		
Fianna Fáil	Paul Ward	15.95%	1,304	1,339	1,354	1,455
Labour	Angela Feeney	13.45%	1,100	1,197	1,206	1,434
Fine Gael	Tim Durkan	13.44%	1,099	1,134	1,139	1,234
Fine Gael	Rioana Mulligan	11.60%	949	985	986	1,088
Green	Peter Hamilton	11.38%	931	1,047	1,053	1,304
Independent	Teresa Murray	10.17%	832	962	967	
Sinn Féin	Réada Cronin	6.24%	510			
Independent	John Reid	1.37%	112			
Electorate: 17,928 Valid: 8,178 Spoilt: 187 Quota: 1,364 Turnout: 8,365 (46.66%)

=== Naas ===
Naas: 7 seats
Party	Candidate	FPv%	Count									
Party	Candidate	FPv%	1	2	3	4	5	6	7	8	9	10
Green	Vincent P. Martin	12.01%	1,462	1,505	1,521	1,596						
Fine Gael	Fintan Brett	10.42%	1,269	1,277	1,283	1,289	1,291	1,302	1,313	1,374	1,510	1,583
Fine Gael	Evie Sammon	9.95%	1,211	1,233	1,236	1,254	1,257	1,305	1,309	1,357	1,667	
Fianna Fáil	Brian Larkin	8.25%	1,004	1,012	1,055	1,064	1,067	1,098	1,122	1,146	1,219	1,229
Independent	Seamie Moore	7.98%	971	982	996	1,037	1,038	1,172	1,325	1,370	1,491	1,512
Fianna Fáil	Carmel Kelly	7.80%	950	963	1,078	1,082	1,084	1,109	1,150	1,422	1,495	1,505
Social Democrats	Bill Clear	7.60%	925	947	966	1,012	1,034	1,070	1,153	1,250	1,319	1,332
Labour	Anne Breen	7.53%	917	926	945	960	965	1,009	1,049	1,281	1,392	1,410
Fine Gael	Darren Scully	7.23%	880	884	894	902	905	932	971	1,000		
Labour	Fergus Carpenter	6.94%	845	858	867	884	886	900	936			
Independent	Gerard Dunne	3.58%	436	448	453	484	487					
Independent	Sorcha O'Neill	3.54%	431	458	461	523	531	602				
People Before Profit	Ashling Merriman	2.58%	314	370	371							
Fianna Fáil	Terry Dignan	2.34%	285	289								
Sinn Féin	Niall Flynn	2.26%	275									
Electorate: 26,430 Valid: 12,175 Spoilt: 261 Quota: 1,522 Turnout: 12,436 (47.05%)

=== Newbridge ===
Newbridge: 6 seats
Party	Candidate	FPv%	Count										
Party	Candidate	FPv%	1	2	3	4	5	6	7	8	9	10	11
Independent	Fiona McLoughlin Healy	22.70%	2,331										
Fine Gael	Peggy O'Dwyer	10.33%	1,061	1,195	1,202	1,228	1,239	1,271	1,467				
Fianna Fáil	Robert Power	9.97%	1,024	1,087	1,090	1,108	1,118	1,141	1,184	1,218	1,228	1,335	1,437
Fine Gael	Tracey O'Dwyer	9.72%	998	1,043	1,045	1,062	1,069	1,088	1,144	1,192	1,231	1,433	1,505
Fianna Fáil	Noel Heavey	7.13%	732	802	809	816	830	869	918	948	952	1,032	1,118
Social Democrats	Chris Pender	6.92%	711	833	848	894	999	1,042	1,065	1,254	1,258	1,313	1,477
Fianna Fáil	Antoinette Buckley	5.75%	590	631	632	639	645	656	675	701	702		
Fianna Fáil	Murty Aspell	5.02%	515	573	575	583	596	627	704	719	719	829	902
Fine Gael	Tom Dempsey	4.63%	475	519	521	529	537	553					
Green	Enda Connolly	4.29%	441	484	497	538	580	628	636				
Independent	Morgan McCabe	4.08%	419	504	546	553	586	654	677	747	749	774	
Sinn Féin	Noel Connolly	3.31%	340	373	377	381							
Aontú	Damian Molyneaux	3.11%	319	376	395	411	452						
Labour	Ciara O'Reilly	2.01%	206	235	237								
Independent	Gerard Delaney	1.03%	106	146									
Electorate: 22,464 Valid: 10,268 Spoilt: 217 Quota: 1,467 Turnout: 10,485 (46.67%)

== Results by gender ==
2019 Kildare County Council election Candidates by gender
Gender	Number of candidates	% of candidates	Elected councillors	% of councillors
Men	61	67.8%	24	60.0%
Women	29	32.2%	16	40.0%
TOTAL	90		40	

== Changes after 2019 ==
=== Co-options ===
Party	Outgoing	LEA	Reason	Date	Co-optee
Sinn Féin	Patricia Ryan	Kildare	Elected to the 33rd Dáil at the 2020 general election	25 February 2020	Noel Connolly
Labour	Mark Wall	Athy	Elected to the 26th Seanad at the 2020 Seanad election	26 May 2020	Mark Leigh
Green	Vincent P. Martin	Naas	Nominated by the Taoiseach to 26th Seanad	September 2020	Colm Kenny

=== Changes in affiliation ===
Name	LEA	Elected as	New affiliation	Date
Vanessa Liston	Celbridge	Green	Independent	18 July 2023

== Sources ==
- "Kildare County Council - Local Election candidates". RTÉ. 13 May 2019. Archived from the original on 31 May 2019.
- "Local Elections 2019: Results, Transfer of Votes and Statistics" (PDF). Department of Housing, Planning and Local Government (DHPLG). pp. 126–135. Archived from the original (PDF) on 10 June 2020.
