= 2009 Kildare County Council election =

Part of the 2009 Irish local elections

← 2004	5 June 2009	2014 →

25 seats on Kildare County Council
	First party	Second party	Third party
Party	Fine Gael	Labour	Fianna Fáil
Seats won	9	6	6
Seat change	+2	+2	-4
	Fourth party	Fifth party
Party	Independent	Green
Seats won	4	0
Seat change	+1	-1
- Map showing the area of Kildare County Council
Council control after election
TBD

An election to Kildare County Council took place on 5 June 2009 as part of that year's Irish local elections. 25 councillors were elected from five local electoral areas (LEAs) for a five-year term of office on the electoral system of proportional representation by means of the single transferable vote (PR-STV).

== Results by party ==
Party	Seats	±	First Pref. votes	FPv%	±%
Fine Gael	9	+2	19,292	28.47	
Labour	6	+2	16,240	23.97	
Fianna Fáil	6	-4	16,036	23.67	
Independent	4	+1	13,685	20.20	
Green	0	-1	2,507	3.70	
Totals	25	-	67,760	100.00	—

== Results by local electoral area ==
=== Athy ===
Athy - 4 seats
Party	Candidate	FPv%	Count				
Party	Candidate	FPv%	1	2	3	4	5
Labour	Mark Wall	28.72	3,284				
Fianna Fáil	Martin Miley, Jnr*	19.06	2,180	2,344			
Fine Gael	Martin Heydon	17.32	1,980	2,156	2,169	2,316	
Fianna Fáil	Mark Dalton*	12.40	1,418	1,558	1,580	1,773	1,880
Fine Gael	Richard Daly	9.34	1,068	1,273	1,282	1,502	2,086
Fine Gael	Billy Hillis*	7.35	840	919	922	991	
Independent	John Lawler	5.82	665	897	906		
Electorate: 22,177 Valid: 11,435 (51.56%) Spoilt: 218 Quota: 2,288 Turnout: 11,653 (52.55%)

=== Celbridge ===
Celbridge - 6 seats
Party	Candidate	FPv%	Count						
Party	Candidate	FPv%	1	2	3	4	5	6	7
Independent	Catherine Murphy*	25.82	4,499						
Labour	Kevin Byrne*	16.86	2,937						
Labour	John McGinley*	12.33	2,149	2,338	2,495				
Fine Gael	Senan Griffin*	7.91	1,378	1,498	1,525	1,553	1,648	1,900	2,091
Fianna Fáil	Paul Kelly*	6.44	1,122	1,291	1,306	1,320	2,005	2,132	2,472
Fine Gael	Katie Ridge*	6.19	1,078	1,276	1,372	1,415	1,500	1,851	2,020
Labour	Colm Purcell	5.92	1,032	1,555	1,626	1,725	1,769	2,005	2,444
Green	Shane Fitzgerald	5.60	975	1,259	1,281	1,358	1,453	1,630	
Fine Gael	Joe Neville	5.46	952	1,224	1,231	1,254	1,272		
Fianna Fáil	Brid Feely	3.44	599	660	675	687			
Fianna Fáil	Paul Ward	2.58	450	489	504	519			
Independent	Ivan Farina	1.45	252	406	428				
Electorate: 35,078 Valid: 17,423 (49.67%) Spoilt: 153 Quota: 2,490 Turnout: 17,576 (50.11%)

=== Clane ===
Clane - 4 seats
Party	Candidate	FPv%	Count								
Party	Candidate	FPv%	1	2	3	4	5	6	7	8	9
Fine Gael	Brendan Weld*	21.60	2,288								
Fianna Fáil	Liam Doyle*	11.85	1,255	1,264	1,276	1,325	1,361	1,720	1,825	2,388	
Independent	Padraig McEvoy	11.43	1,211	1,269	1,292	1,518	1,601	1,647	1,790	2,071	2,180
Fianna Fáil	P.J. Sheridan	9.25	980	986	1,004	1,008	1,045	1,265	1,380		
Independent	Jim Reilly	8.90	943	972	976	996	1,037	1,134			
Fine Gael	Seamus Langan	8.80	932	942	1,022	1,039	1,124	1,183	1,530	1,617	1,681
Fianna Fáil	Daragh Fitzpatrick*	7.98	845	851	857	860	898				
Labour	Chris Rowland	7.38	782	802	813	888	1,303	1,334	1,470	1,560	1,602
Labour	Rose Devine	6.85	726	771	783	799					
Independent	David Flanagan	3.80	402	426	429						
Independent	Leo Armstrong	2.15	228								
Electorate: 20,439 Valid: 10,592 (51.82%) Spoilt: 126 Quota: 2,119 Turnout: 10,718 (52.44%)

=== Kildare ===
Kildare - 6 seats
Party	Candidate	FPv%	Count									
Party	Candidate	FPv%	1	2	3	4	5	6	7	8	9	10
Independent	Paddy Kennedy	11.81	1,869	1,949	2,086	2,459						
Fianna Fáil	Suzanne Doyle*	10.45	1,654	1,692	1,717	1,757	1,769	1,834	2,203	2,328		
Fine Gael	Michael Nolan, Jnr*	9.99	1,582	1,620	1,671	1,798	1,846	2,100	2,357			
Fianna Fáil	Fiona O'Loughlin*	9.54	1,511	1,562	1,586	1,638	1,659	1,881	2,410			
Fine Gael	Tony O'Donnell	9.48	1,500	1,544	1,558	1,583	1,590	2,235				
Fine Gael	Mark Stafford	9.28	1,469	1,518	1,528	1,549	1,564					
Fianna Fáil	Pat Black*	8.94	1,415	1,444	1,473	1,578	1,597	1,617				
Labour	Francis Browne*	8.48	1,343	1,424	1,513	1,620	1,657	1,782	1,885	1,896	1,942	1,974
Labour	Adrian Kane	8.47	1,341	1,411	1,527	1,612	1,650	1,761	1,844	1,856	1,900	1,911
Independent	Murty Aspell	5.53	876	937	1,013							
Sinn Féin	Seán Downey	4.18	662	686								
Green	John Hardy	2.32	367									
Independent	John Tierney	1.53	242									
Electorate: 33,921 Valid: 15,831 (46.67%) Spoilt: 240 Quota: 2,262 Turnout: 16,071 (47.38%)

=== Naas ===
Naas - 5 seats
Party	Candidate	FPv%	Count						
Party	Candidate	FPv%	1	2	3	4	5	6	7
Fine Gael	Anthony Lawlor	16.08	2,113	2,140	2,207				
Fine Gael	Darren Scully	16.07	2,112	2,151	2,222				
Labour	Paddy McNamara*	13.83	1,817	1,838	1,930	2,420			
Independent	Seamus Moore	12.42	1,632	1,688	1,952	2,086	2,174	2,194	
Fianna Fáil	Willie Callaghan*	10.07	1,323	1,435	1,479	1,526	1,541	1,544	2,144
Green	J.J. Power*	8.87	1,165	1,201	1,281	1,377	1,492	1,499	1,716
Fianna Fáil	James Lawless	7.39	971	1,040	1,075	1,097	1,108	1,109	
Labour	Pat McCarthy	6.31	829	847	908				
Independent	Donal Corcoran	5.61	737	786					
Fianna Fáil	Tiernach Cassidy	2.38	313						
Independent	David Monaghan	0.98	129						
Electorate: 25,810 Valid: 13,141 (50.91%) Spoilt: 135 Quota: 2,191 Turnout: 13,276 (51.44%)
