= Joe Neville =

Joe Neville may refer to:

- Joe Neville (sport shooter)
- Joe Neville (politician)

== See also ==
- Joseph Neville, American soldier, planter and politician from Virginia
