= 2014 Offaly County Council election =

Part of the 2014 Irish local elections

| ← 2009 | 23 May 2014 | 2019 → |

All 19 seats on Offaly County Council 10 seats needed for a majority
| | First party | Second party | Third party |
|---|---|---|---|
| Party | Fianna Fáil | Sinn Féin | Fine Gael |
| Seats won | 8 | 3 | 3 |
| Seat change | -1 | +3 | -3 |
| | Fourth party |
| Party | Independent |
| Seats won | 5 |
| Seat change | -1 |
- Map showing the area of Offaly County Council

An election to all 19 seats on Offaly County Council took place on 23 May 2014 as part of the 2014 Irish local elections, a decrease from 21 seats at the 2009 election. County Offaly was divided into three local electoral areas (LEAs) to elect councillors for a five-year term of office on the electoral system of proportional representation by means of the single transferable vote (PR-STV). In addition, the town councils of Birr, Edenderry and Tullamore were all abolished.

Fianna Fáil remained the largest party after the elections winning 8 seats. Sinn Féin won 3 seats and in terms of vote share also became the second largest party. Fine Gael, by contrast, had a poor set of results and lost half of their seats.

== Results by party ==
| Party | Seats | ± | 1st pref | FPv% | ±% |
|---|---|---|---|---|---|
| Fianna Fáil | 8 | -1 | 11,116 | 34.1 | |
| Sinn Féin | 3 | +3 | 5,613 | 17.2 | |
| Fine Gael | 3 | -3 | 5,475 | 16.8 | |
| Green | 0 | - | 58 | 0.18 | |
| Independent | 5 | -1 | 9,731 | 29.9 | |
| Total | 19 | -2 | 32,583 | 100.0 | — |

== Results by local electoral area ==
*: Outgoing councillor.

=== Birr ===
Birr: 6 seats
| Party | Candidate | FPv% | Count | | | | | |
| Party | Candidate | FPv% | 1 | 2 | 3 | 4 | 5 | 6 |
|---|---|---|---|---|---|---|---|---|
| Independent | John Leahy | 23.05 | 2,686 | | | | | |
| Fianna Fáil | Peter Ormond | 13.71 | 1,598 | 1,678 | | | | |
| Fine Gael | John Clendennen | 10.37 | 1,209 | 1,317 | 1,384 | 1,574 | 1,943 | |
| Sinn Féin | Carol Nolan | 10.01 | 1,166 | 1,420 | 1,518 | 1,636 | 1,703 | |
| Fianna Fáil | Eamon Dooley | 9.92 | 1,156 | 1,287 | 1,315 | 1,516 | 1,539 | 1,552 |
| Independent | John Carroll | 9.06 | 1,056 | 1,147 | 1,325 | 1,353 | 1,529 | 1,618 |
| Fianna Fáil | Michael Loughnane | 7.61 | 887 | 950 | 991 | 1,012 | 1,205 | 1,271 |
| Fine Gael | Denis Sheils | 6.32 | 736 | 775 | 873 | 991 | | |
| Fine Gael | Pat Phelan | 5.59 | 651 | 760 | 790 | | | |
| Independent | Teresa Ryan-Feehan | 4.37 | 509 | 655 | | | | |
Electorate: 20,034 Valid: 11,654 (58.17%) Spoilt: 116 Quota: 1,665 Turnout: 11,770 (58.75%)

=== Edenderry ===
Edenderry: 6 seats
| Party | Candidate | FPv% | Count | | | | | | | | |
| Party | Candidate | FPv% | 1 | 2 | 3 | 4 | 5 | 6 | 7 | 8 | 9 |
|---|---|---|---|---|---|---|---|---|---|---|---|
| Sinn Féin | Martin O'Reilly††††† | 19.08 | 1,669 | | | | | | | | |
| Fianna Fáil | Eddie Fitzpatrick | 14.29 | 1,250 | | | | | | | | |
| Independent | John Foley | 12.33 | 1,078 | 1,229 | 1,254 | | | | | | |
| Fianna Fáil | Noel Bourke | 10.37 | 907 | 940 | 945 | 968 | 1,031 | 1,069 | 1,106 | 1,239 | 1,378 |
| Fine Gael | Liam Quinn | 7.64 | 668 | 697 | 702 | 761 | 787 | 831 | 1,040 | 1,145 | 1,207 |
| Fianna Fáil | Ger Plunkett | 7.62 | 667 | 705 | 707 | 708 | 710 | 722 | 741 | 799 | 818 |
| Independent | Noel Cribbin | 7.24 | 633 | 669 | 676 | 704 | 787 | 848 | 862 | 890 | 1,106 |
| Independent | Fergus McDonnell | 5.03 | 440 | 482 | 501 | 518 | 569 | 618 | 645 | 658 | |
| Fine Gael | William Whittle | 3.84 | 336 | 344 | 348 | 367 | 374 | 382 | | | |
| Fianna Fáil | Robert Kelleghan | 3.84 | 336 | 352 | 353 | 353 | 361 | 391 | 400 | | |
| Independent | Stephen Carroll | 2.76 | 241 | 266 | 298 | 300 | 304 | | | | |
| Labour | Declan Leddin | 2.76 | 241 | 254 | 256 | 272 | | | | | |
| Independent | Patricia Brady | 1.99 | 174 | 180 | 183 | | | | | | |
| Independent | Emmanuel Sweeney | 1.21 | 106 | 128 | | | | | | | |
Electorate: 15,890 Valid: 8,746 (55.04%) Spoilt: 113 Quota: 1,250 Turnout: 8,859 (55.75%)

=== Tullamore ===
Tullamore: 7 seats
| Party | Candidate | FPv% | Count | | | | | | | | | | | |
| Party | Candidate | FPv% | 1 | 2 | 3 | 4 | 5 | 6 | 7 | 8 | 9 | 10 | 11 | 12 |
|---|---|---|---|---|---|---|---|---|---|---|---|---|---|---|
| Sinn Féin | Brendan Killeavy | 22.8 | 2,778 | | | | | | | | | | | |
| Independent | Dervill Dolan | 15.33 | 1,868 | | | | | | | | | | | |
| Fianna Fáil | Sinead Dooley | 9.53 | 1,161 | 1,340 | 1,379 | 1,384 | 1,403 | 1,432 | 1,493 | 1,541 | | | | |
| Fianna Fáil | Frank Moran | 9.12 | 1,111 | 1,156 | 1,308 | 1,311 | 1,333 | 1,344 | 1,359 | 1,428 | 1,457 | 1,482 | 1,495 | 1,505 |
| Fianna Fáil | Declan Harvey | 9.07 | 1,105 | 1,307 | 1,323 | 1,327 | 1,342 | 1,354 | 1,415 | 1,434 | 1,570 | | | |
| Fine Gael | Tommy McKeigue | 7.91 | 964 | 1,066 | 1,088 | 1,091 | 1,107 | 1,227 | 1,300 | 1,332 | 1,756 | | | |
| Fianna Fáil | Danny Owens | 7.70 | 938 | 1,011 | 1,022 | 1,025 | 1,034 | 1,068 | 1,095 | 1,122 | 1,177 | 1,217 | 1,230 | 1,236 |
| Fine Gael | Molly Buckley | 5.06 | 616 | 695 | 713 | 718 | 731 | 808 | 893 | 936 | | | | |
| Independent | Seán O'Brien | 3.92 | 478 | 768 | 784 | 796 | 858 | 864 | 907 | 1,012 | 1,102 | 1,209 | 1,230 | 1,232 |
| Labour | Paddy Doheny | 2.86 | 349 | 393 | 399 | 409 | 418 | 430 | | | | | | |
| Independent | John Bracken | 2.63 | 321 | 425 | 462 | 472 | 509 | 515 | 532 | | | | | |
| Fine Gael | Theresa Wrafter | 2.42 | 295 | 308 | 316 | 320 | 323 | | | | | | | |
| Independent | Seamus Kirwan | 1.16 | 141 | 239 | 258 | 270 | | | | | | | | |
| Green | Richard Brennan | 0.48 | 58 | 84 | 85 | | | | | | | | | |
Electorate: 20,607 Valid: 12,183 (59.12%) Spoilt: 119 Quota: 1,523 Turnout: 12,302 (59.70%)

== Changes ==
=== Co-options ===
| Party | Outgoing | LEA | Reason | Date | Co-optee |
|---|---|---|---|---|---|
| Sinn Féin | Carol Nolan | Birr | Elected to the 32nd Dáil at the 2016 general election. | 26 February 2016 | Sean Maher |
| Fianna Fáil | Sinead Dooley | Tullamore | Appointed CEO of Irish Rural Link. | 19 September 2017 | Tony McCormack |
| Sinn Féin | Martin O'Reilly | Edenderry | Resigned to pursue a career in teaching. | 22 January 2019 | Alan Davy |

=== Changes in affiliation ===
| Name | LEA | Elected as | New affiliation | Date |
|---|---|---|---|---|
| John Leahy | Birr | Independent | Renua | 13 March 2015 |
| Noel Cribbin | Edenderry | Independent | Fine Gael | 8 November 2018 |

== Sources ==
"Offaly County Council". Irish Independent. Archived from the original on 1 June 2014.
