= Naoise Ó Cearúil =

Irish politician

Naoise Ó Cearúil TD
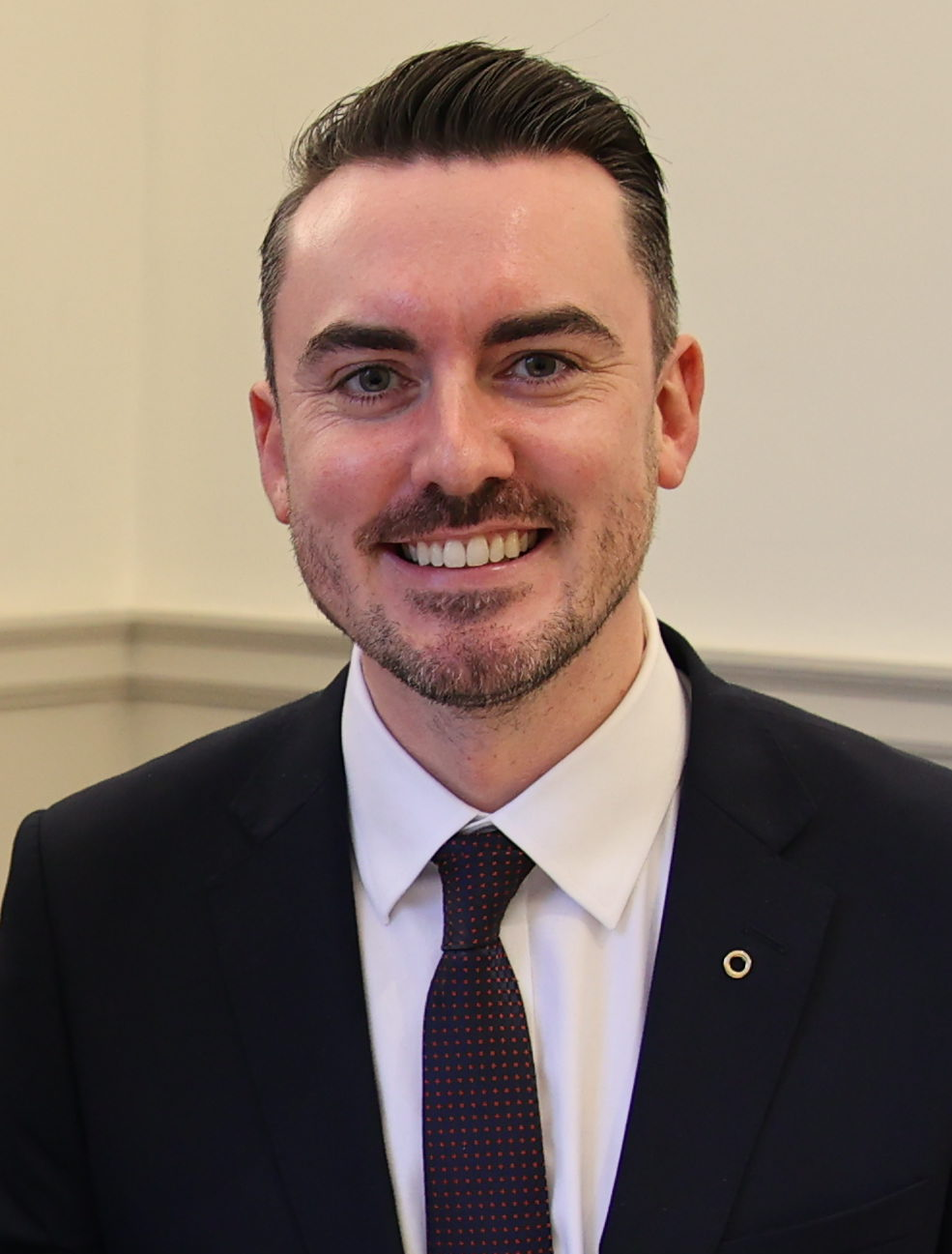
- Ó Cearúil in 2024

Teachta Dála
- Incumbent
- Assumed office November 2024
- Constituency: Kildare North

Personal details
- Born: 1988/1989 (age 36–37) County Kildare, Ireland
- Party: Fianna Fáil
- Education: Maynooth University

Naoise Ó Cearúil (born 1988/1989) is an Irish Fianna Fáil politician who has been a Teachta Dála (TD) for the Kildare North constituency since the 2024 general election.

== Early life ==
Born and raised in Maynooth, he was educated in Leixlip, Kilcock and Maynooth. He studied at Maynooth University where he graduated with a Bachelor of Business and Law in 2011, and a Diploma in Irish. While at Maynooth, he was president of the university's Irish society, Cuallacht na Gaeilge, and the Law Society.

== Career ==
He was first elected to Kildare County Council at the 2014 local elections for the Maynooth local electoral area at the age of 24. Re-elected in 2019 and again in 2024, he has previously served as Mayor of Kildare from 2021 to 2022. He was chosen to run at the 2024 general election with James Lawless, with whom he secured a second seat for the party in the enlarged five seat constituency. Prior to his election to the Dáil, he worked in the technology sector in Kildare.

Dáil	Election	Deputy (Party)	Deputy (Party)	Deputy (Party)	Deputy (Party)	Deputy (Party)
28th	1997	Emmet Stagg (Lab)	Charlie McCreevy (FF)	Bernard Durkan (FG)	3 seats until 2007	
29th	2002	Emmet Stagg (Lab)	Charlie McCreevy (FF)	Bernard Durkan (FG)	3 seats until 2007	
29th	2005 by-election	Emmet Stagg (Lab)	Catherine Murphy (Ind.)	Bernard Durkan (FG)	3 seats until 2007	
30th	2007	Emmet Stagg (Lab)	Áine Brady (FF)	Bernard Durkan (FG)	Michael Fitzpatrick (FF)	4 seats until 2024
31st	2011	Emmet Stagg (Lab)	Catherine Murphy (Ind.)	Bernard Durkan (FG)	Anthony Lawlor (FG)	4 seats until 2024
32nd	2016	Frank O'Rourke (FF)	Catherine Murphy (SD)	Bernard Durkan (FG)	James Lawless (FF)	4 seats until 2024
33rd	2020	Réada Cronin (SF)	Catherine Murphy (SD)	Bernard Durkan (FG)	James Lawless (FF)	4 seats until 2024
34th	2024	Réada Cronin (SF)	Aidan Farrelly (SD)	Joe Neville (FG)	James Lawless (FF)	Naoise Ó Cearúil (FF)
