= Bernard Durkan =

Irish former politician (born 1945)

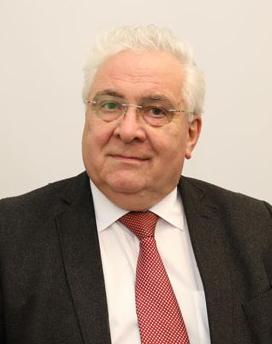
- Durkan in 2020

Minister of State
- 1994–1997: Social Welfare

Teachta Dála
- In office June 1997 – November 2024
- Constituency: Kildare North
- In office November 1982 – June 1997
- In office June 1981 – February 1982
- Constituency: Kildare

Senator
- In office 13 May 1982 – 24 November 1982
- Constituency: Agricultural Panel

Personal details
- Born: 26 March 1945 (age 81) Swinford, County Mayo, Ireland
- Party: Fine Gael
- Spouse: Hilary Spence (m. 1983)
- Children: 2

Bernard J. Durkan (born 26 March 1945) is an Irish former Fine Gael politician who served as a Teachta Dála (TD) for the Kildare North constituency from 1997 to 2024, and previously from 1982 to 1997 and 1981 to 1982 for the Kildare constituency. He previously served as Minister of State for Social Welfare from 1994 to 1997. He was a Senator for the Agricultural Panel from May 1982 to November 1982.

== Personal life ==
He was born in Killasser, Swinford, County Mayo, in 1945. Durkan was educated at St. John's, Carramore, County Mayo.

His son Tim Durkan is a Fine Gael politician having been elected to Kildare County Council in 2014 for the Maynooth electoral area. He retained his seat as a councillor at the 2019 and 2024 local elections.

Durkan took part in a farmer's road blockade protest in 1967 and was imprisoned in Mountjoy Prison and Portlaoise Prison for eight weeks after refusing to pay a £7 10s. fine.

== Politics ==
He was elected to Kildare County Council in 1976 and was a member until 1994, serving as chairman from 1986 to 1987. He was elected to Dáil Éireann for the Kildare constituency at the 1981 general election, but lost his seat at the February 1982 general election following the defeat of the Fine Gael–Labour Party coalition. He was then subsequently elected as a member of the 16th Seanad as a Senator for the Agricultural Panel.

Durkan regained his Dáil seat at the November 1982 general election, and was re-elected at the 1987, 1989, and 1992 general elections. When the Kildare constituency was divided, he was elected at the 1997 general election for the new constituency of Kildare North, and retained his seat at the 2002 and 2007 general elections. He also topped the poll in the 2011 general election. He was re-elected at the 2016 general election and 2020 general election, retaining his seat on both occasions on the final count.

During his career as a member of Dáil Éireann, he has held several Front Bench portfolios in Fine Gael, including Health, Food, Trade and Industry, Insurance, Overseas Development Aid and Human Rights, and Communications and Natural Resources. He served as Minister of State for Social Welfare from 1994 to 1997.

He previously served as vice-chairman of the Joint Oireachtas on Committee on Foreign Affairs and Trade and as a member of the Joint Committee on European Affairs. He has also previously acted as the chairman on the Oireachtas Committee of European Affairs and a member of the Eastern Health Board. He has also served as Fine Gael Chief Whip. In 2010, Durkan refused to defer the drawing of his ministerial pension while still being paid as a TD. He instead decided to donate this pension to charity.

In 2023, Durkan called for an inquiry into the usage of parental alienation in family law cases, which he described as a "pseudo-condition".

In September 2024, he was the oldest TD in the 33rd Dáil.

He lost his seat at the 2024 general election.

Dáil	Election	Deputy (Party)	Deputy (Party)	Deputy (Party)
4th	1923	Hugh Colohan (Lab)	John Conlan (FP)	George Wolfe (CnaG)
5th	1927 (Jun)	Hugh Colohan (Lab)	Domhnall Ua Buachalla (FF)	George Wolfe (CnaG)
6th	1927 (Sep)	Hugh Colohan (Lab)	Domhnall Ua Buachalla (FF)	George Wolfe (CnaG)
6th	1931 by-election	Thomas Harris (FF)	Domhnall Ua Buachalla (FF)	George Wolfe (CnaG)
7th	1932	Thomas Harris (FF)	William Norton (Lab)	Sydney Minch (CnaG)
8th	1933	Thomas Harris (FF)	William Norton (Lab)	Sydney Minch (CnaG)
9th	1937	Constituency abolished. See Carlow–Kildare		

Dáil	Election	Deputy (Party)	Deputy (Party)	Deputy (Party)	Deputy (Party)	Deputy (Party)
13th	1948	William Norton (Lab)	Thomas Harris (FF)	Gerard Sweetman (FG)	3 seats until 1961	3 seats until 1961
14th	1951	William Norton (Lab)	Thomas Harris (FF)	Gerard Sweetman (FG)	3 seats until 1961	3 seats until 1961
15th	1954	William Norton (Lab)	Thomas Harris (FF)	Gerard Sweetman (FG)	3 seats until 1961	3 seats until 1961
16th	1957	William Norton (Lab)	Patrick Dooley (FF)	Gerard Sweetman (FG)	3 seats until 1961	3 seats until 1961
17th	1961	William Norton (Lab)	Patrick Dooley (FF)	Gerard Sweetman (FG)	Brendan Crinion (FF)	4 seats 1961–1969
17th	1964 by-election	Terence Boylan (FF)	Patrick Dooley (FF)	Gerard Sweetman (FG)	Brendan Crinion (FF)	4 seats 1961–1969
18th	1965	Terence Boylan (FF)	Patrick Norton (Lab)	Gerard Sweetman (FG)	Brendan Crinion (FF)	4 seats 1961–1969
19th	1969	Terence Boylan (FF)	Paddy Power (FF)	Gerard Sweetman (FG)	3 seats 1969–1981	3 seats 1969–1981
19th	1970 by-election	Terence Boylan (FF)	Paddy Power (FF)	Patrick Malone (FG)	3 seats 1969–1981	3 seats 1969–1981
20th	1973	Joseph Bermingham (Lab)	Paddy Power (FF)	Patrick Malone (FG)	3 seats 1969–1981	3 seats 1969–1981
21st	1977	Joseph Bermingham (Lab)	Paddy Power (FF)	Charlie McCreevy (FF)	3 seats 1969–1981	3 seats 1969–1981
22nd	1981	Joseph Bermingham (Lab)	Paddy Power (FF)	Charlie McCreevy (FF)	Bernard Durkan (FG)	Alan Dukes (FG)
23rd	1982 (Feb)	Joseph Bermingham (Lab)	Paddy Power (FF)	Charlie McCreevy (FF)	Gerry Brady (FF)	Alan Dukes (FG)
24th	1982 (Nov)	Joseph Bermingham (Lab)	Paddy Power (FF)	Charlie McCreevy (FF)	Bernard Durkan (FG)	Alan Dukes (FG)
25th	1987	Emmet Stagg (Lab)	Paddy Power (FF)	Charlie McCreevy (FF)	Bernard Durkan (FG)	Alan Dukes (FG)
26th	1989	Emmet Stagg (Lab)	Seán Power (FF)	Charlie McCreevy (FF)	Bernard Durkan (FG)	Alan Dukes (FG)
27th	1992	Emmet Stagg (Lab)	Seán Power (FF)	Charlie McCreevy (FF)	Bernard Durkan (FG)	Alan Dukes (FG)
28th	1997	Constituency abolished. See Kildare North and Kildare South				

Dáil	Election	Deputy (Party)	Deputy (Party)	Deputy (Party)	Deputy (Party)	Deputy (Party)
28th	1997	Emmet Stagg (Lab)	Charlie McCreevy (FF)	Bernard Durkan (FG)	3 seats until 2007	
29th	2002	Emmet Stagg (Lab)	Charlie McCreevy (FF)	Bernard Durkan (FG)	3 seats until 2007	
29th	2005 by-election	Emmet Stagg (Lab)	Catherine Murphy (Ind.)	Bernard Durkan (FG)	3 seats until 2007	
30th	2007	Emmet Stagg (Lab)	Áine Brady (FF)	Bernard Durkan (FG)	Michael Fitzpatrick (FF)	4 seats until 2024
31st	2011	Emmet Stagg (Lab)	Catherine Murphy (Ind.)	Bernard Durkan (FG)	Anthony Lawlor (FG)	4 seats until 2024
32nd	2016	Frank O'Rourke (FF)	Catherine Murphy (SD)	Bernard Durkan (FG)	James Lawless (FF)	4 seats until 2024
33rd	2020	Réada Cronin (SF)	Catherine Murphy (SD)	Bernard Durkan (FG)	James Lawless (FF)	4 seats until 2024
34th	2024	Réada Cronin (SF)	Aidan Farrelly (SD)	Joe Neville (FG)	James Lawless (FF)	Naoise Ó Cearúil (FF)
