= Kildare North (Dáil constituency) =

Dáil constituency (1997–present)

- Dáil constituency
- Location of Kildare North within Ireland
- Interactive map of constituency boundaries since the 2024 general election
- Major settlements: Celbridge; Clane; Kilcock; Leixlip; Maynooth; Naas

Current constituency
- Created: 1997
- Seats: 3 (1997–2007); 4 (2007–2024); 5 (2024–)
- TDs: Réada Cronin (SF); Aidan Farrelly (SD); James Lawless (FF); Joe Neville (FG); Naoise Ó Cearúil (FF)
- Local government area: County Kildare
- Created from: Kildare
- EP constituency: Midlands–North-West

Kildare North is a parliamentary constituency represented in Dáil Éireann, the lower house of the Irish parliament or Oireachtas. The constituency elects five deputies (Teachtaí Dála, commonly known as TDs) on the electoral system of proportional representation by means of the single transferable vote (PR-STV).

== History and boundaries ==
The constituency was created at the 1997 general election, when the former 5-seat Kildare constituency was divided into Kildare North and Kildare South. At the 1997 and 2002 elections, Kildare North was a 3-seat constituency, but it was allocated an extra seat at the 2007 general election. The constituency spans the more densely populated north-eastern corner of County Kildare, taking in the towns of Celbridge, Clane, Leixlip, Kilcock, Maynooth and Naas.

The Constituency Review Report 2023 of the Electoral Commission recommended that at the next general election, Kildare North be increased to a five-seat constituency with the transfer of territory from Kildare South.

The Electoral (Amendment) Act 2023 defines the constituency as:

"In the county of Kildare, the electoral divisions of:

Balraheen, Celbridge, Cloncurry, Donadea, Donaghcumper, Kilcock, Leixlip, Maynooth, Straffan, in the former Rural District of Celbridge No. 1;
Ballynadrumny, Cadamstown, Dunfierth in the former Rural District of Edenderry No. 2;
Bodenstown, Clane, Carragh, Donore, Downings, Kill, Killashee, Kilteel, Ladytown, Naas Rural, Newtown, Oughterard, Rathmore, Timahoe North, in the former Rural District of Naas No. 1;
and Naas Urban."

Changes to the Kildare North constituency 1997–present
Years	TDs	Boundaries	Notes
1997–2002	3	In County Kildare, the electoral divisions of Balraheen, Celbridge, Cloncurry, Donadea, Donaghcumper, Kilcock, Leixlip, Maynooth, Straffan, in the former Rural District of Celbridge No. 1; Ballynadrumny, Cadamstown, Carbury, Carrick, Drehid, Dunfierth, Kilrainy, Windmill Cross, in the former Rural District of Edenderry No. 2; Bodenstown, Clane, Kill, Kilteel, Naas Rural, Oughterard, Rathmore, Timahoe North, in the former Rural District of Naas; and the urban district of Naas.	Created from Kildare
2002–2007	3	In County Kildare, the electoral divisions of Balraheen, Celbridge, Cloncurry, Donadea, Donaghcumper, Kilcock, Leixlip, Maynooth, Straffan, in the former Rural District of Celbridge No. 1; Bodenstown, Clane, Kill, Kilteel, Naas Rural, Oughterard, Rathmore, Timahoe North, in the former Rural District of Naas; and the urban district of Naas.	Transfer to Kildare South of Ballynadrumny, Cadamstown, Carbury, Carrick, Drehid, Dunfierth, Kilrainy, Windmill Cross, in the former Rural District of Edenderry No. 2.
2007–2011	4	In County Kildare, the electoral divisions of Balraheen, Celbridge, Cloncurry, Donadea, Donaghcumper, Kilcock, Leixlip, Maynooth, Straffan, in the former Rural District of Celbridge No. 1; Ballynadrumny, Cadamstown, Carbury, Carrick, Drehid, Dunfierth, Kilrainy, Windmill Cross, in the former Rural District of Edenderry No. 2; Bodenstown, Clane, Downings, Kill, Kilteel, Naas Rural, Oughterard, Rathmore, Robertstown, Timahoe North, Timahoe South, in the former Rural District of Naas No. 1; and the town of Naas.	Transfer from Kildare South of Ballynadrumny, Cadamstown, Carbury, Carrick, Drehid, Dunfierth, Kilrainy, Windmill Cross, in the former Rural District of Edenderry No. 2, and Downings, Robertstown, and Timahoe South, in the former Rural District of Naas No. 1.
2011–2016	4	In County Kildare, the electoral divisions of Balraheen, Celbridge, Cloncurry, Donadea, Donaghcumper, Kilcock, Leixlip, Maynooth, Straffan, in the former Rural District of Celbridge No. 1; Ballynadrumny, Cadamstown, Carbury, Carrick, Drehid, Dunfierth, Kilpatrick, Kilrainy, Windmill Cross, in the former Rural District of Edenderry No. 2; Bodenstown, Clane, Downings, Kill, Kilteel, Naas Rural, Newtown, Oughterard, Rathmore, Robertstown, Timahoe North, Timahoe South, in the former Rural District of Naas No. 1; and the town of Naas.	Transfer from Kildare South of Kilpatrick, in the former Rural District of Edenderry No. 2, and Newtown, in the former Rural District of Naas No. 1.
2016–2020	4	In County Kildare, the electoral divisions of Balraheen, Celbridge, Cloncurry, Donadea, Donaghcumper, Kilcock, Leixlip, Maynooth, Straffan, in the former Rural District of Celbridge No. 1; Ballynadrumny, Cadamstown, Carbury, Carrick, Drehid, Dunfierth, Kilrainy, in the former Rural District of Edenderry No. 2; Bodenstown, Clane, Downings, Kill, Kilteel, Naas Rural, Newtown, Oughterard, Rathmore, Timahoe North, in the former Rural District of Naas No. 1; and the town of Naas.	Transfer to Kildare South of Kilpatrick and Windmill Cross, in the former Rural District of Edenderry No. 2, and Robertstown and Timahoe South, in the former Rural District of Naas No. 1.
2020–	4	In County Kildare, the electoral divisions of Balraheen, Celbridge, Cloncurry, Donadea, Donaghcumper, Kilcock, Leixlip, Maynooth, Straffan, in the former Rural District of Celbridge No. 1; Ballynadrumny, Cadamstown, Dunfierth, in the former Rural District of Edenderry No. 2; Bodenstown, Clane, Downings, Kill, Kilteel, Naas Rural, Newtown, Oughterard, Rathmore, Timahoe North, in the former Rural District of Naas No. 1; and Naas Urban.	Transfer to Kildare South of Carbury, Carrick, Drehid and Kilrainy, in the former Rural District of Edenderry No. 2.

== TDs ==
Teachtaí Dála (TDs) for Kildare North 1997–
Key to parties: FF = Fianna Fáil; FG = Fine Gael; Ind. = Independent; Lab = Labour; SD = Social Democrats; SF = Sinn Féin
Dáil	Election	Deputy (Party)	Deputy (Party)	Deputy (Party)	Deputy (Party)	Deputy (Party)
28th	1997	Emmet Stagg (Lab)	Charlie McCreevy (FF)	Bernard Durkan (FG)	3 seats until 2007	
29th	2002	Emmet Stagg (Lab)	Charlie McCreevy (FF)	Bernard Durkan (FG)	3 seats until 2007	
29th	2005 by-election	Emmet Stagg (Lab)	Catherine Murphy (Ind.)	Bernard Durkan (FG)	3 seats until 2007	
30th	2007	Emmet Stagg (Lab)	Áine Brady (FF)	Bernard Durkan (FG)	Michael Fitzpatrick (FF)	4 seats until 2024
31st	2011	Emmet Stagg (Lab)	Catherine Murphy (Ind.)	Bernard Durkan (FG)	Anthony Lawlor (FG)	4 seats until 2024
32nd	2016	Frank O'Rourke (FF)	Catherine Murphy (SD)	Bernard Durkan (FG)	James Lawless (FF)	4 seats until 2024
33rd	2020	Réada Cronin (SF)	Catherine Murphy (SD)	Bernard Durkan (FG)	James Lawless (FF)	4 seats until 2024
34th	2024	Réada Cronin (SF)	Aidan Farrelly (SD)	Joe Neville (FG)	James Lawless (FF)	Naoise Ó Cearúil (FF)

Note: The columns in this table are used only for presentational purposes, and no significance should be attached to the order of columns. For details of the order in which seats were won at each election, see the detailed results of that election.

== Elections ==
*: Outgoing TD

=== 2024 general election ===
2024 general election: Kildare North
Party	Candidate	FPv%	Count											
Party	Candidate	FPv%	1	2	3	4	5	6	7	8	9	10	11	12
Fianna Fáil	James Lawless	15.3	8,734	8,747	8,758	8,793	8,822	9,117	9,323	10,007				
Social Democrats	Aidan Farrelly	13.3	7,611	7,635	8,222	8,348	8,420	8,934	9,207	9,338	9,380	11,118		
Sinn Féin	Réada Cronin	11.9	6,806	6,843	6,997	7,927	8,046	8,123	8,531	8,580	8,590	8,930	9,233	10,381
Fianna Fáil	Naoise Ó Cearúil	10.3	5,872	5,889	5,901	5,924	5,972	6,099	6,313	6,418	6,497	7,227	7,524	8,444
Fine Gael	Joe Neville	9.7	5,533	5,535	5,548	5,564	5,594	5,762	5,883	7,197	7,326	7,727	7,993	8,641
Fine Gael	Bernard Durkan	8.1	4,632	4,640	4,643	4,662	4,698	4,828	4,921	5,558	5,648	6,036	6,201	6,881
Labour	Angela Feeney	5.8	3,337	3,358	3,439	3,492	3,528	3,884	4,025	4,180	4,213			
Fine Gael	Evie Sammon	5.4	3,111	3,117	3,128	3,137	3,144	3,339	3,410					
Independent	Bill Clear	5.1	2,906	2,961	3,027	3,068	3,352	3,541	4,373	4,641	4,760	5,096	5,458	
Aontú	Una O'Connor	3.8	2,174	2,283	2,324	2,356	2,973	3,026						
Green	Vincent P. Martin	3.6	2,059	2,063	2,115	2,138	2,162							
Irish Freedom	Gerry Waters	2.2	1,254	1,494	1,519	1,535								
Sinn Féin	Caroline Hogan	2.2	1,244	1,261	1,365									
PBP–Solidarity	Leah Whelan (Note: Whelan is a member of Solidarity.)	2.0	1,156	1,175										
The Irish People	Avril Corcoran	0.9	533											
Centre Party	Sean Gill	0.1	67											
Electorate: 95,055 Valid: 57,029 Spoilt: 357 (0.6%) Quota: 9,505 Turnout: 57,386 (60.4%)

=== 2020 general election ===
2020 general election: Kildare North
Party	Candidate	FPv%	Count					
Party	Candidate	FPv%	1	2	3	4	5	6
Social Democrats	Catherine Murphy	19.3	9,808	10,180	11,008			
Sinn Féin	Réada Cronin	17.1	8,705	9,192	9,508	9,623	9,732	11,079
Fianna Fáil	James Lawless	13.8	7,029	7,146	7,357	7,417	7,909	9,357
Fianna Fáil	Frank O'Rourke	12.4	6,336	6,596	6,945	7,035	7,238	7,956
Fine Gael	Bernard Durkan	10.7	5,447	5,522	5,910	6,006	8,521	10,258
Green	Vincent P. Martin	10.0	5,100	5,473	5,901	6,211	6,674	
Fine Gael	Anthony Lawlor	7.1	3,621	3,693	3,871	3,920		
Labour	Emmet Stagg	5.4	2,751	2,853				
Renua	Séamus Ó Riain	1.9	967					
Solidarity–PBP	Paul Mahon (Note: Mahon was a member of People Before Profit.)	1.7	861					
Independent	David Monaghan	0.4	197					
Independent	Wayne Swords	0.2	123					
Electorate: 81,884 Valid: 50,945 Spoilt: 382 (0.7%) Quota: 10,190 Turnout: 51,327 (62.7%)

=== 2016 general election ===
2016 general election: Kildare North
Party	Candidate	FPv%	Count								
Party	Candidate	FPv%	1	2	3	4	5	6	7	8	9
Social Democrats	Catherine Murphy	22.7	11,108								
Fianna Fáil	James Lawless	15.3	7,461	7,592	7,696	7,737	7,919	8,003	8,256	8,850	9,444
Fianna Fáil	Frank O'Rourke	12.9	6,341	6,486	6,528	6,562	6,711	6,879	7,138	7,684	8,479
Fine Gael	Bernard Durkan	12.6	6,147	6,268	6,302	6,322	6,472	6,531	6,740	6,974	8,890
Fine Gael	Anthony Lawlor	11.1	5,406	5,490	5,544	5,572	5,714	5,767	6,046	6,213	7,402
Labour	Emmet Stagg	8.4	4,087	4,288	4,349	4,408	4,488	4,632	5,181	5,775	
Sinn Féin	Réada Cronin	6.5	3,205	3,323	3,390	3,621	3,708	4,146	4,497		
Green	Maebh Ní Fhallúin	3.0	1,485	1,649	1,715	1,804	2,020	2,419			
Independent	Brendan Young	2.4	1,200	1,323	1,467	1,737	1,858				
Renua	Shane Fitzgerald	2.0	994	1,086	1,154	1,236					
AAA–PBP	Ashling Merriman	1.6	781	873	943						
Independent	Michael Beirne	0.7	372	389							
Independent	Gerard Dunne	0.5	249	261							
Independent	Elizabeth O'Sullivan	0.2	99	119							
Electorate: 77,609 Valid: 48,935 Spoilt: 291 (0.6%) Quota: 9,788 Turnout: 49,226 (63.4%)

=== 2011 general election ===
2011 general election: Kildare North
Party	Candidate	FPv%	Count				
Party	Candidate	FPv%	1	2	3	4	5
Fine Gael	Bernard Durkan	19.9	10,168	10,420			
Labour	Emmet Stagg	19.0	9,718	9,976	10,264		
Independent	Catherine Murphy	13.5	6,911	7,474	7,696	8,716	11,639
Fine Gael	Anthony Lawlor	13.4	6,882	7,074	7,283	7,667	9,088
Labour	John McGinley	10.3	5,261	5,489	5,590	6,449	
Fianna Fáil	Áine Brady	9.3	4,777	4,910	6,627	6,821	7,288
Sinn Féin	Martin Kelly	5.7	2,896	3,043	3,111		
Fianna Fáil	Michael Fitzpatrick	5.2	2,659	2,714			
Green	Shane Fitzgerald	1.8	905				
Independent	Eric Doyle-Higgins	0.8	423				
Independent	Michael Beirne	0.8	422				
Independent	Bart Murphy	0.4	200				
Electorate: 76,773 Valid: 51,222 Spoilt: 388 (0.8%) Quota: 10,245 Turnout: 51,610 (67.2%)

=== 2007 general election ===
2007 general election: Kildare North
Party	Candidate	FPv%	Count					
Party	Candidate	FPv%	1	2	3	4	5	6
Fianna Fáil	Áine Brady	24.9	11,245					
Labour	Emmet Stagg	17.4	7,882	8,063	8,107	8,468	9,220	
Fianna Fáil	Michael Fitzpatrick	14.6	6,606	8,113	8,151	8,817	9,097	
Fine Gael	Bernard Durkan	11.8	5,340	5,427	5,471	5,663	5,912	9,229
Independent	Catherine Murphy	11.5	5,188	5,339	5,474	5,881	6,733	7,652
Fine Gael	Darren Scully	9.4	4,250	4,306	4,332	4,489	4,832	
Green	Shane Fitzgerald	4.9	2,215	2,289	2,342	2,668		
Sinn Féin	Cristin McCauley	2.4	1,103	1,135	1,154			
Progressive Democrats	Jeff Aherne	2.1	983	1,083	1,103			
Independent	John Corish	0.5	234	244				
Independent	Gerry Browne	0.3	145	153				
Electorate: 71,311 Valid: 45,191 Spoilt: 232 (0.5%) Quota: 9,039 Turnout: 45,423 (63.7%)

=== 2005 by-election ===
Fianna Fáil TD Charlie McCreevy was appointed as a European Commissioner on 22 November 2004. The by-election was held on 11 March 2005.

2005 by-election: Kildare North
Party	Candidate	FPv%	Count				
Party	Candidate	FPv%	1	2	3	4	5
Fianna Fáil	Áine Brady	24.5	6,201	6,255	7,265	8,133	9,818
Independent	Catherine Murphy	23.6	5,985	6,189	7,176	8,809	12,256
Fine Gael	Darren Scully	18.3	4,630	4,660	5,382	7,421	
Labour	Paddy MacNamara	17.8	4,507	4,545	5,199		
Progressive Democrats	Kate Walsh	7.9	2,006	2,023			
Green	J. J. Power	6.1	1,547	1,621			
Independent	Gerry Browne	0.9	226				
Independent	Seanán Ó Coistín	0.8	211				
Electorate: 65,080 Valid: 25,313 Spoilt: 211 (0.8%) Quota: 12,657 Turnout: 25,524 (39.2%)

=== 2002 general election ===
2002 general election: Kildare North
Party	Candidate	FPv%	Count				
Party	Candidate	FPv%	1	2	3	4	5
Fianna Fáil	Charlie McCreevy	27.5	9,082				
Labour	Emmet Stagg	21.4	7,051	7,168	8,005	9,472	
Fine Gael	Bernard Durkan	17.5	5,786	5,859	6,177	7,341	8,025
Fianna Fáil	Paul Kelly	15.7	5,168	5,681	5,923	7,382	7,890
Progressive Democrats	Kate Walsh	11.9	3,919	4,027	4,473		
Green	Anne Kelly McCormack	6.0	1,974	1,999			
Electorate: 60,094 Valid: 32,980 Spoilt: 291 (0.9%) Quota: 8,246 Turnout: 33,271 (55.4%)

=== 1997 general election ===
1997 general election: Kildare North
Party	Candidate	FPv%	Count				
Party	Candidate	FPv%	1	2	3	4	5
Fianna Fáil	Charlie McCreevy	21.9	6,905	7,055	7,152	8,156	
Fine Gael	Bernard Durkan	21.2	6,653	6,804	7,932		
Labour	Emmet Stagg	19.0	5,964	6,255	6,445	6,721	8,952
Fianna Fáil	Paul Kelly	12.9	4,039	4,160	4,197	4,879	5,582
Democratic Left	Catherine Murphy	8.8	2,762	3,067	3,204	3,392	
Progressive Democrats	Timmy Conway	6.7	2,101	2,252	2,351		
Fine Gael	Mary French	5.0	1,569	1,719			
Green	Seán English	4.5	1,403				
Electorate: 50,957 Valid: 31,396 Spoilt: 295 (0.9%) Quota: 7,850 Turnout: 31,691 (60.5%)

== See also ==
- Elections in the Republic of Ireland
- Politics of the Republic of Ireland
- List of Dáil by-elections
- List of political parties in the Republic of Ireland
