= Frank O'Rourke (politician) =

Irish former politician (born 1967)

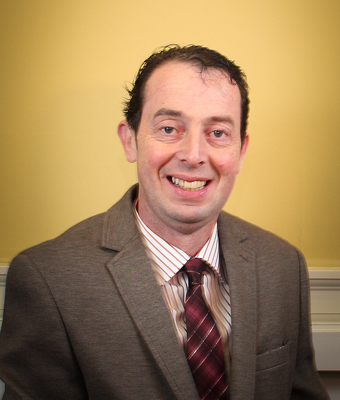
- O'Rourke in 2016

Teachta Dála
- In office February 2016 – February 2020
- Constituency: Kildare North

Personal details
- Born: 15 May 1967 (age 59) Sligo, Ireland
- Party: Fianna Fáil
- Education: Institute of Technology, Sligo

Frank O'Rourke (born 15 May 1967) is an Irish former Fianna Fáil politician who served as a Teachta Dála (TD) for the Kildare North constituency from 2016 to 2020.

O'Rourke was born in Sligo in 1967. He is a native of County Leitrim, O'Rourke was first co-opted onto Kildare County Council in January 2011 to replace Paul Kelly. He retained his seat in the 2014 local elections, topping the poll in the Celbridge-Leixlip local electoral area, with 1,814 first preference votes.

At the 2016 general election, he was elected as a Fianna Fáil TD for Kildare North to Dáil Éireann, and was subsequently appointed as Fianna Fáil junior spokesperson on Financial Services, eGovernment and Procurement by party leader Micheál Martin.

O'Rourke lost his seat at the 2020 general election. He blamed his defeat on a smear campaign against him, which involved both social media posts and leaflets, and took legal proceedings against Facebook and Twitter seeking to identify the people involved. The orders were granted in late 2020, and Twitter supplied the information sought. However, Facebook claimed to be unable to retrieve the data.

Dáil	Election	Deputy (Party)	Deputy (Party)	Deputy (Party)	Deputy (Party)	Deputy (Party)
28th	1997	Emmet Stagg (Lab)	Charlie McCreevy (FF)	Bernard Durkan (FG)	3 seats until 2007	
29th	2002	Emmet Stagg (Lab)	Charlie McCreevy (FF)	Bernard Durkan (FG)	3 seats until 2007	
29th	2005 by-election	Emmet Stagg (Lab)	Catherine Murphy (Ind.)	Bernard Durkan (FG)	3 seats until 2007	
30th	2007	Emmet Stagg (Lab)	Áine Brady (FF)	Bernard Durkan (FG)	Michael Fitzpatrick (FF)	4 seats until 2024
31st	2011	Emmet Stagg (Lab)	Catherine Murphy (Ind.)	Bernard Durkan (FG)	Anthony Lawlor (FG)	4 seats until 2024
32nd	2016	Frank O'Rourke (FF)	Catherine Murphy (SD)	Bernard Durkan (FG)	James Lawless (FF)	4 seats until 2024
33rd	2020	Réada Cronin (SF)	Catherine Murphy (SD)	Bernard Durkan (FG)	James Lawless (FF)	4 seats until 2024
34th	2024	Réada Cronin (SF)	Aidan Farrelly (SD)	Joe Neville (FG)	James Lawless (FF)	Naoise Ó Cearúil (FF)
