= Vincent P. Martin =

Irish politician (born 1968)

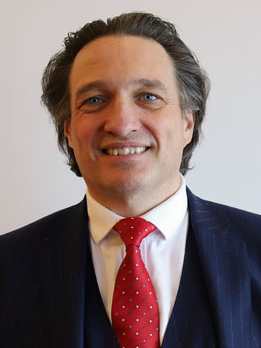
- Martin in 2020

Senator
- In office 29 June 2020 – 31 January 2025
- Constituency: Nominated by the Taoiseach

Personal details
- Born: 1968 Cavan, Ireland
- Party: Green Party (since 2006)
- Other political affiliations: Fianna Fáil (c. 1999)
- Spouse: Hilda Cummins
- Children: 2
- Relatives: Catherine Martin (sister); Francis Noel Duffy (brother-in-law)
- Education: University College Dublin; Maynooth University; King's Inns

Vincent Peter Martin (born 1968) is an Irish Green Party politician who served as a Senator from June 2020 to January 2025, after being nominated by the Taoiseach.

== Early life ==
Martin was born in Cavan in 1968, but is a native of Carrickmacross, County Monaghan. The "P" in his name is a reference not only to his middle name (Peter) but to his grand-uncle, Vincent "Pepper" Martin, a Brooklyn-based professional boxer who once made an appearance on the front cover of The Ring, a well-known sports magazine. His sister, Catherine Martin, is the former deputy leader of the Green Party, whom Vincent recruited in. Previous to politics, Martin was a barrister by profession.

He is married to Hilda Cummins, and they have two children, a son and a daughter.

== Political career ==
Martin began his political career in 1999 as a member of Carrickmacross Town Council. He was an independent candidate at the 2002 general election in Cavan–Monaghan. He received 1,943 (3.1%) first preference votes but was not elected. He later became a Monaghan County Councillor in 2004 as an independent member, however, previous to this some sources have stated he was a member of Fianna Fáil.

He lost his seat on Monaghan County Council in 2009. He served in local politics for 10 years and he was noted as one of the few representatives at that time who advocated for Environmentalism and stood firm on decisions about planning permission. In 2006, this prompted then Green Party leader John Gormley to recruit Martin into the Green Party. He was a Green Party candidate at the 2007 general election for Cavan–Monaghan, receiving 2,382 (3.6%) first preference votes, but again was not elected.

In 2009, Martin stepped away from local politics to concentrate on being a barrister and to spend time with his new wife. He was expected to name fellow local Green Party member Darcy Lonergan as his replacement, but as Longeran was away studying in the United States, Vincent instead co-opted his sister Catherine into the position. Catherine vacated her seat upon the death of the Martins' mother and co-opted it to the returning Lonergan.

Martin remained out of politics for a decade. In that time he moved to Naas in County Kildare. In 2019, he returned to politics, topping the poll in the Naas local electoral area at the 2019 local elections.

At the 2020 general election, he ran as a Green Party candidate in Kildare North, but was not elected. In June 2020, when the Green Party entered into government, Martin was nominated by the Taoiseach to the Seanad. He was one of only two men among the 11 nominees.

== Legal issues ==
On 9 February 2016, Martin drove his car through a red light at a pedestrian crossing in Dundrum, Dublin, striking a pram containing a baby; the child was thrown out of the pram onto the road but was not injured. The child's mother, Slovak-born Jana Novakova, suffered injuries to her right arm and shoulder, as well as post-traumatic stress disorder. She sued for damages; the case was settled in the High Court in 2022.
