= Anthony Lawlor =

Irish former politician (born 1959)

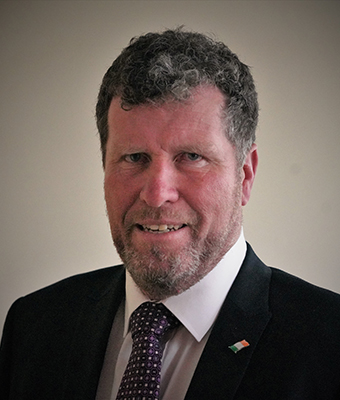
- Lawlor in 2016

Senator
- In office 27 April 2018 – 29 June 2020
- Constituency: Agricultural Panel

Teachta Dála
- In office February 2011 – February 2016
- Constituency: Kildare North

Personal details
- Born: 13 June 1959 (age 67) Johnstown, County Kildare, Ireland
- Party: Fine Gael
- Parent: Patsy Lawlor (mother)
- Education: University College Dublin; NUI, Maynooth

Anthony Lawlor (born 13 June 1959) is an Irish former Fine Gael politician who served as a Senator for the Agricultural Panel from 2018 to 2020. He served as a Teachta Dála (TD) for the Kildare North constituency from 2011 to 2016.

== Early life ==
A son of Tony and Patsy Lawlor, he was educated at Multyfarnham Agricultural College, University College Dublin and NUI, Maynooth.

He was co-opted to Kildare County Council in 1998, following the death of his mother Patsy. He was elected in 1999 as an independent councillor for the Naas local electoral area. He did not stand for election in 2004. In 2009, he was re-elected as a Councillor, this time as a member of Fine Gael.

== Politics ==
Lawlor was elected as a Fine Gael TD for the Kildare North constituency at the 2011 general election.

On 11 December 2012, Lawlor introduced a bill in the Oireachtas intended to outlaw the clocking of vehicle odometers, which is not currently illegal in Ireland.

He lost his seat at the 2016 general election. He subsequently failed to get elected to Seanad Éireann in April 2016.

He was elected to 25th Seanad on the Agricultural Panel in a by-election on 27 April 2018. The vacancy was caused by the resignation of Senator Trevor Ó Clochartaigh. He was an unsuccessful candidate for Kildare North at the 2020 general election. He did not contest the 2020 Seanad election.

== See also ==
- Families in the Oireachtas

Dáil	Election	Deputy (Party)	Deputy (Party)	Deputy (Party)	Deputy (Party)	Deputy (Party)
28th	1997	Emmet Stagg (Lab)	Charlie McCreevy (FF)	Bernard Durkan (FG)	3 seats until 2007	
29th	2002	Emmet Stagg (Lab)	Charlie McCreevy (FF)	Bernard Durkan (FG)	3 seats until 2007	
29th	2005 by-election	Emmet Stagg (Lab)	Catherine Murphy (Ind.)	Bernard Durkan (FG)	3 seats until 2007	
30th	2007	Emmet Stagg (Lab)	Áine Brady (FF)	Bernard Durkan (FG)	Michael Fitzpatrick (FF)	4 seats until 2024
31st	2011	Emmet Stagg (Lab)	Catherine Murphy (Ind.)	Bernard Durkan (FG)	Anthony Lawlor (FG)	4 seats until 2024
32nd	2016	Frank O'Rourke (FF)	Catherine Murphy (SD)	Bernard Durkan (FG)	James Lawless (FF)	4 seats until 2024
33rd	2020	Réada Cronin (SF)	Catherine Murphy (SD)	Bernard Durkan (FG)	James Lawless (FF)	4 seats until 2024
34th	2024	Réada Cronin (SF)	Aidan Farrelly (SD)	Joe Neville (FG)	James Lawless (FF)	Naoise Ó Cearúil (FF)
