= Réada Cronin =

Irish politician

Réada Cronin TD
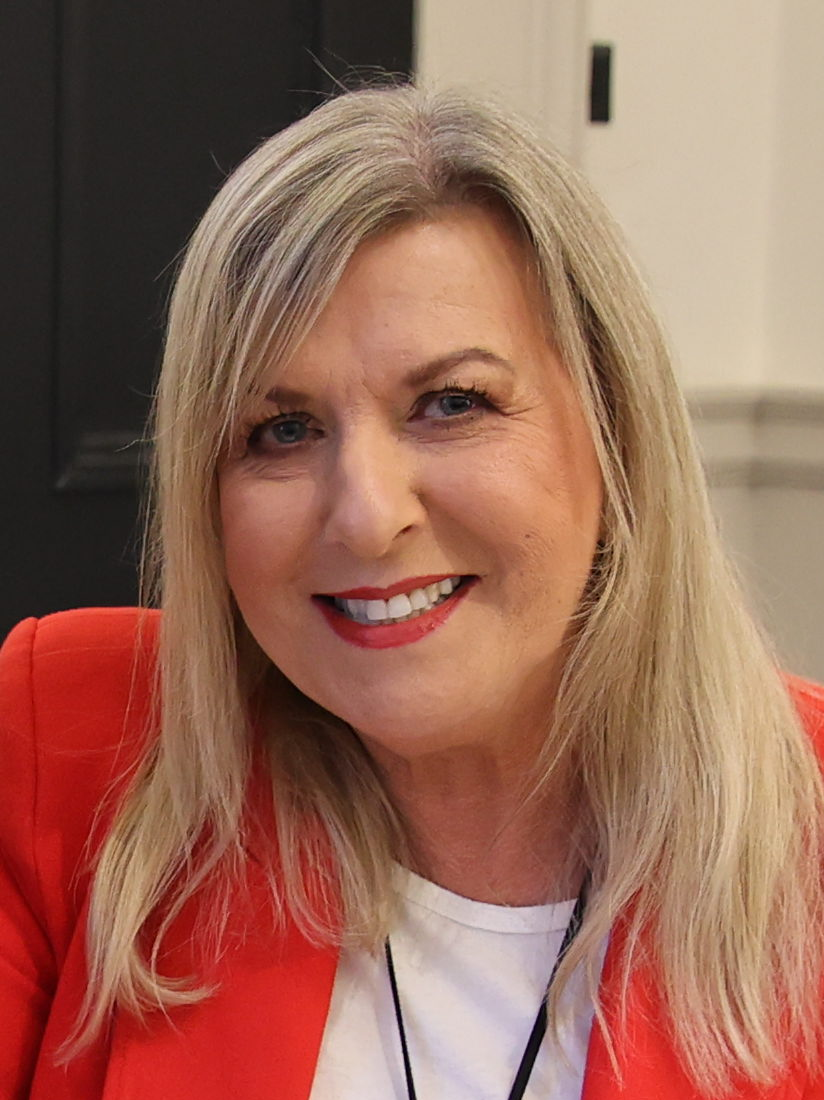
- Cronin in 2024

Teachta Dála
- Incumbent
- Assumed office February 2020
- Constituency: Kildare North

Personal details
- Born: 1963/1964 (age 61–62) Dublin, Ireland
- Party: Sinn Féin
- Spouse: Donal Quinn
- Children: 4

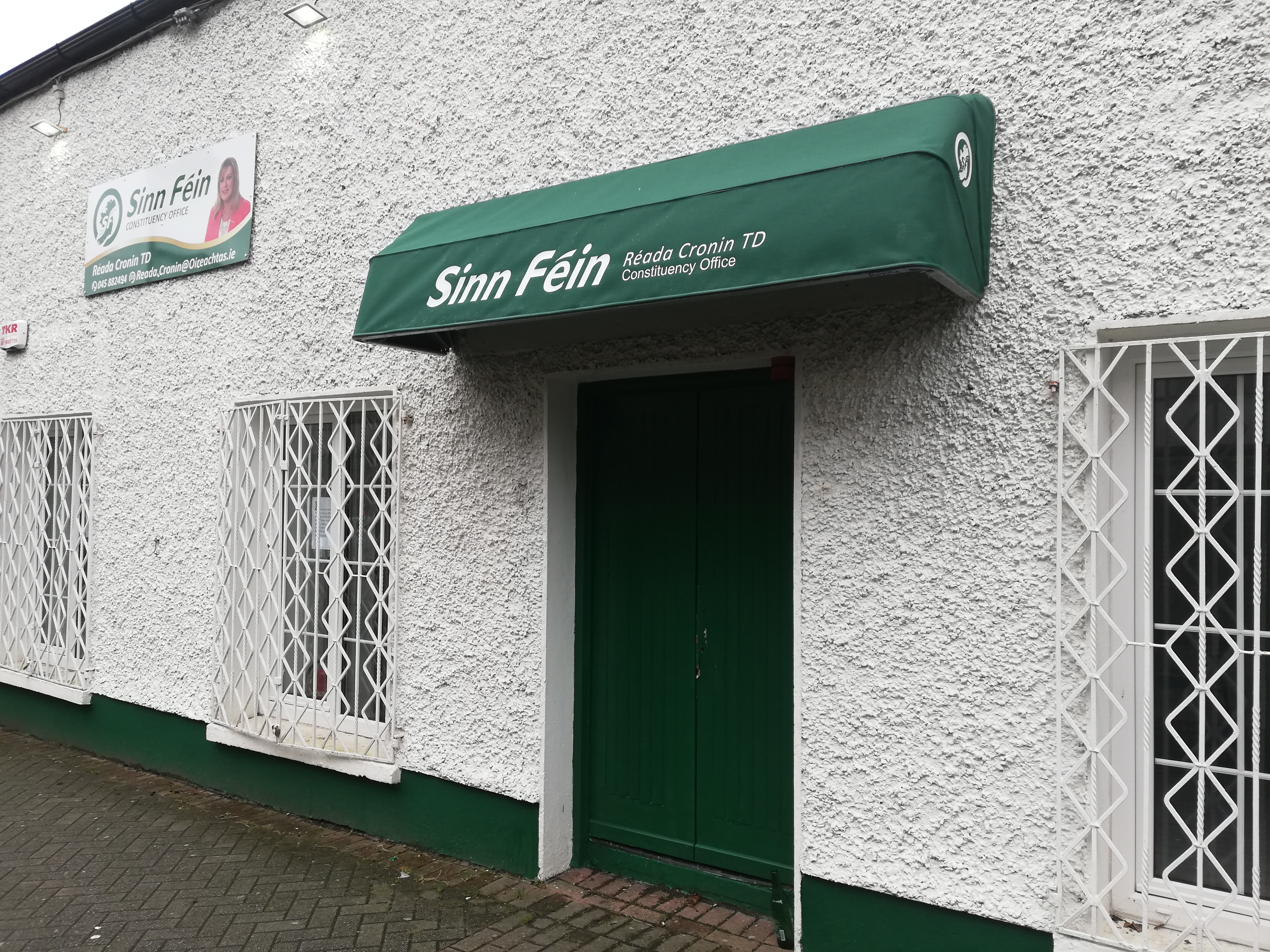
Constituency office, Naas

Réada Cronin (born 1963/1964) is an Irish Sinn Féin politician who has been a Teachta Dála (TD) for the Kildare North constituency since the 2020 general election.

== Political career ==
Cronin was a member of Kildare County Councillor for the Maynooth local electoral area from 2014 to 2019, until she lost her seat following the 2019 local elections, going out on the first count. She had previously contested the 2016 general election, gaining 3,000 first preferences but failed to get elected. Cronin was elected as a Sinn Féin TD for the Kildare North constituency following the 2020 general election.

== Controversies ==
=== Social media conduct ===
Immediately following her election as a TD in 2020, a number of controversies arose from Cronin's past. It emerged that in 2019, Cronin tweeted that "sinister" Mossad interference in the 2019 United Kingdom general election was responsible for the defeat of Jeremy Corbyn. Cronin added that Corbyn was a "principled man" victimized by "lies, deceit, fake news, and the sinister activities of the Mossad Secret Service", and that the alleged Mossad actions were "blatant as f***." After being criticised by the Israeli embassy in Ireland for a "history of paranoid, hate-driven conspiracy theories," Cronin backtracked, calling her comments "throwaway remarks." Sinn Féin issued a statement stating that Cronin's remarks "do not represent the views of Sinn Féin".

Older tweets surfaced in the following days where she claimed Israel had "taken Nazism to a new level", linked Hitler to the Rothschild family, compared a picture of monkeys working on computers to the Israeli Embassy and suggested Irish judges could be paedophiles and promoted conspiracy theories about the harmful effects of water fluoridation. Her comments were condemned by Taoiseach Leo Varadkar and by Maurice Cohen, chair of the Jewish Representative Council of Ireland who characterised them as "inaccurate, anti-Semitic and racist".

=== Breaking planning permission laws ===
After her 2020 election, it came to light that Cronin and her husband Donal built a €1,000,000 home in Kildare in 2002 knowing that they did not have full planning permission to do so. When Cronin and her partner were subsequently caught by Kildare County Council, they lobbied then Minister for Finance Charlie McCreevy to personally intervene, which he did do. Cronin issued a statement in which she declared "In relation to my former home, there was an issue in respect of planning and this matter was settled in court, with the consent of Kildare County Council. This dates back almost two decades and is a matter of public record. As a public representative, I will always answer for matters relevant to my role, but matters relating to my family and my personal life are not relevant to my role as a TD."

Dáil	Election	Deputy (Party)	Deputy (Party)	Deputy (Party)	Deputy (Party)	Deputy (Party)
28th	1997	Emmet Stagg (Lab)	Charlie McCreevy (FF)	Bernard Durkan (FG)	3 seats until 2007	
29th	2002	Emmet Stagg (Lab)	Charlie McCreevy (FF)	Bernard Durkan (FG)	3 seats until 2007	
29th	2005 by-election	Emmet Stagg (Lab)	Catherine Murphy (Ind.)	Bernard Durkan (FG)	3 seats until 2007	
30th	2007	Emmet Stagg (Lab)	Áine Brady (FF)	Bernard Durkan (FG)	Michael Fitzpatrick (FF)	4 seats until 2024
31st	2011	Emmet Stagg (Lab)	Catherine Murphy (Ind.)	Bernard Durkan (FG)	Anthony Lawlor (FG)	4 seats until 2024
32nd	2016	Frank O'Rourke (FF)	Catherine Murphy (SD)	Bernard Durkan (FG)	James Lawless (FF)	4 seats until 2024
33rd	2020	Réada Cronin (SF)	Catherine Murphy (SD)	Bernard Durkan (FG)	James Lawless (FF)	4 seats until 2024
34th	2024	Réada Cronin (SF)	Aidan Farrelly (SD)	Joe Neville (FG)	James Lawless (FF)	Naoise Ó Cearúil (FF)
