= James Lawless =

Irish politician (born 1976)

James Lawless TD
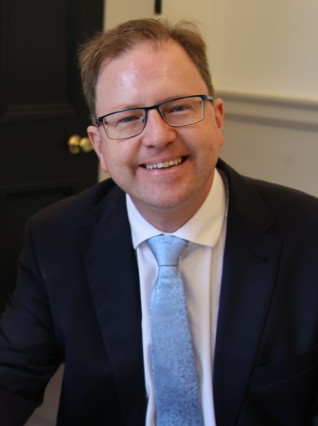
- Lawless in 2024

Minister for Further and Higher Education, Research, Innovation and Science
- Incumbent
- Assumed office 23 January 2025
- Taoiseach: Micheál Martin
- Preceded by: Patrick O'Donovan

Minister of State
- 2024–2025: Transport
- 2024–2025: Environment, Climate and Communications

Chair of the Committee on Justice
- In office 15 September 2020 – 8 November 2024
- Preceded by: Caoimhghín Ó Caoláin

Teachta Dála
- Incumbent
- Assumed office February 2016
- Constituency: Kildare North

Kildare County Councillor
- In office 2014–2016
- Constituency: Naas

Personal details
- Born: 19 August 1976 (age 50) Wexford, Ireland
- Party: Fianna Fáil
- Spouse: Ailish Lawless (m. 2002)
- Children: 2
- Education: Trinity College Dublin; King's Inns
- Website: jameslawless.ie

James Lawless (born 19 August 1976) is an Irish Fianna Fáil politician who has served as Minister for Further and Higher Education, Research, Innovation and Science since January 2025. He served as a Minister of State from 2024 to 2025. He has been a Teachta Dála (TD) for Kildare North since the 2016 general election.

== Early life ==
Lawless is originally from Wexford. He earned a degree in mathematics from Trinity College Dublin in 2000. This was followed by a masters in high performance computing, also from Trinity College Dublin. He worked as a systems analyst in his early career and subsequently qualified as a barrister at the Kings Inns.

== Political career ==
He had contested the 2009 local elections unsuccessfully, but topped the poll in the 2014 local elections with 2,123 votes, becoming a member of Kildare County Council from 2014 to 2016. While a member of Kildare County Council, he served as Mayor of Naas. Lawless has been a member of the Fianna Fáil national executive since 2012. Initially elected annually at the Ardfheis, since 2022 he has served as "Honorary National Secretary".

Lawless was founder and editor of the party's magazine, Cuisle, which produced regular publications between 2012 and 2015.

He was elected to the Dáil in the 2016 Irish general election for Kildare North. In May 2016, he was appointed by the party leader Micheál Martin as Fianna Fáil spokesperson on Science, Technology, Research and Development. He was a member of the Energy and Communications Oireachtas committee, and in February 2017, he was elected as vice-chair of that committee. In February 2018, he was appointed a member of the Business, Enterprise and Innovation Oireachtas committee. He proposed a bills to regulate online political advertising and the use of drones.

In 2017, Lawless initiated the "Online Advertising and Social Media (Transparency) Bill 2017" which sought to regulate social media companies in Ireland.

He was re-elected to the Dáil in 2020 and was subsequently appointed chair of the Committee on Justice in September 2020.

In 2022, Lawless chaired a commission to rewrite the “Aims and Objectives” of the party, which involved talking to every constituency unit of the party and also taking soundings from former leaders, ministers and various stakeholders. The results were put to the 2022 Ardfheis and adopted as the revised mission statement for the party.

On 27 June 2024, he was appointed as Minister of State at the Department of Transport with responsibility for International and Road Transport and Logistics; and also as Minister of State at the Department of the Environment, Climate and Communications with responsibility for Postal Policy.

Following the 2024 general election 23 January 2025, Lawless was appointed as Minister for Further and Higher Education, Research, Innovation and Science in the government led by Micheál Martin.

=== Political views ===
==== Progressive Universalism ====
Lawless has shared his belief in 'progressive universalism' when discussing matters relating to the funding of government supports. He has indicated that he is a proponent of policies that seek to provide supports that are permanent, sustainable and costed. Especially in the context of limited public resources. This has steered his decision making in relation to reducing the student contribution fee as part of the 2026 Irish budget.

==== Drug policy ====
In a 2025 interview, Lawless stated that he supports a health-led approach to drug policy, advocating for the decriminalisation of cannabis as a first step. He argues that prohibition leads to uncertainty about drug potency and composition, making consumption more dangerous. He believes cannabis should be regulated like alcohol and tobacco, with clear labelling and potency warnings, and sees merit in the Portuguese model. While he acknowledges that full legalisation is likely in the future, he stresses the need for a coordinated European approach to avoid Ireland becoming a destination for drug tourism.

On harder drugs, Lawless distinguishes between naturally occurring substances (such as peyote and psilocybin mushrooms) which have historical cultural use, and synthetic drugs like crystal meth and ecstasy. He is open to discussing decriminalisation for the former but strongly opposes legalising synthetic drugs, viewing them as highly potent and toxic.

== Election results ==
Elections to Dáil Éireann
Party	Election		FPv	FPv%	Result
Fianna Fáil	Kildare North	2016	7,461	15.3	Elected
Fianna Fáil	Kildare North	2020	7,029	13.8	Elected
Fianna Fáil	Kildare North	2024	8,734	15.3	Elected

Political offices
Preceded by Jack Chambers	Minister of State at the Department of Transport; 2024–2025	Succeeded by Seán Canney
Preceded by Jack Chambers	Minister of State at the Department of the Environment, Climate and Communications; 2024–2025	Succeeded by Alan Dillon
Preceded by Patrick O'Donovan	Minister for Further and Higher Education, Research, Innovation and Science; 2025–present	Incumbent

Dáil	Election	Deputy (Party)	Deputy (Party)	Deputy (Party)	Deputy (Party)	Deputy (Party)
28th	1997	Emmet Stagg (Lab)	Charlie McCreevy (FF)	Bernard Durkan (FG)	3 seats until 2007	
29th	2002	Emmet Stagg (Lab)	Charlie McCreevy (FF)	Bernard Durkan (FG)	3 seats until 2007	
29th	2005 by-election	Emmet Stagg (Lab)	Catherine Murphy (Ind.)	Bernard Durkan (FG)	3 seats until 2007	
30th	2007	Emmet Stagg (Lab)	Áine Brady (FF)	Bernard Durkan (FG)	Michael Fitzpatrick (FF)	4 seats until 2024
31st	2011	Emmet Stagg (Lab)	Catherine Murphy (Ind.)	Bernard Durkan (FG)	Anthony Lawlor (FG)	4 seats until 2024
32nd	2016	Frank O'Rourke (FF)	Catherine Murphy (SD)	Bernard Durkan (FG)	James Lawless (FF)	4 seats until 2024
33rd	2020	Réada Cronin (SF)	Catherine Murphy (SD)	Bernard Durkan (FG)	James Lawless (FF)	4 seats until 2024
34th	2024	Réada Cronin (SF)	Aidan Farrelly (SD)	Joe Neville (FG)	James Lawless (FF)	Naoise Ó Cearúil (FF)
