= 2014 Irish local elections =

Nationwide local authority elections

- 23 May 2014

949 County and City Council Seats
- Turnout: 51.70% ▼6.07pp
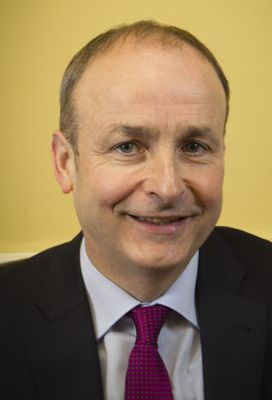

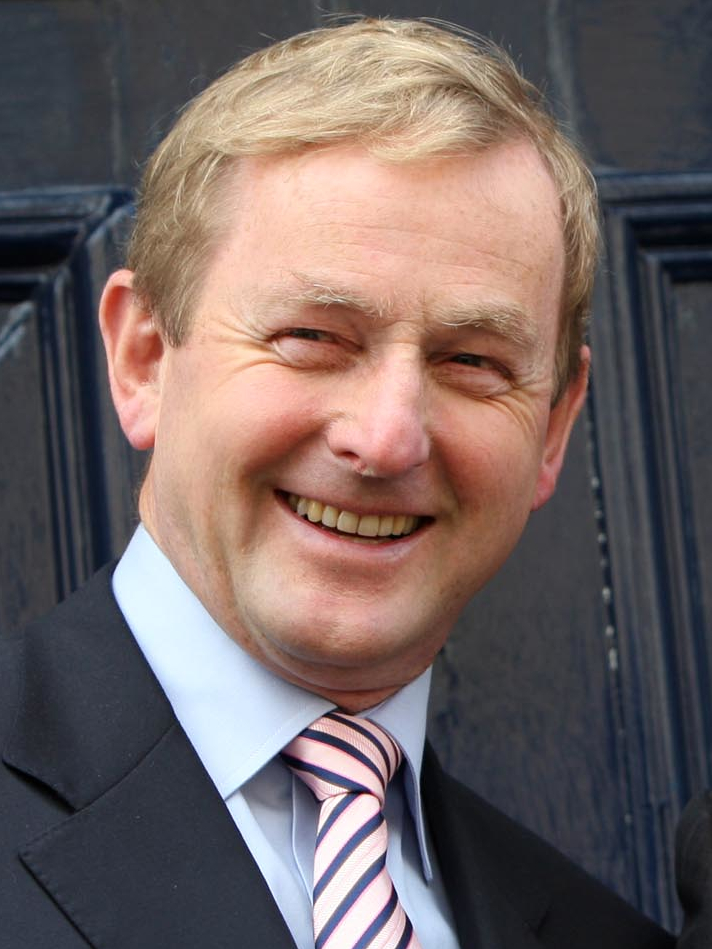

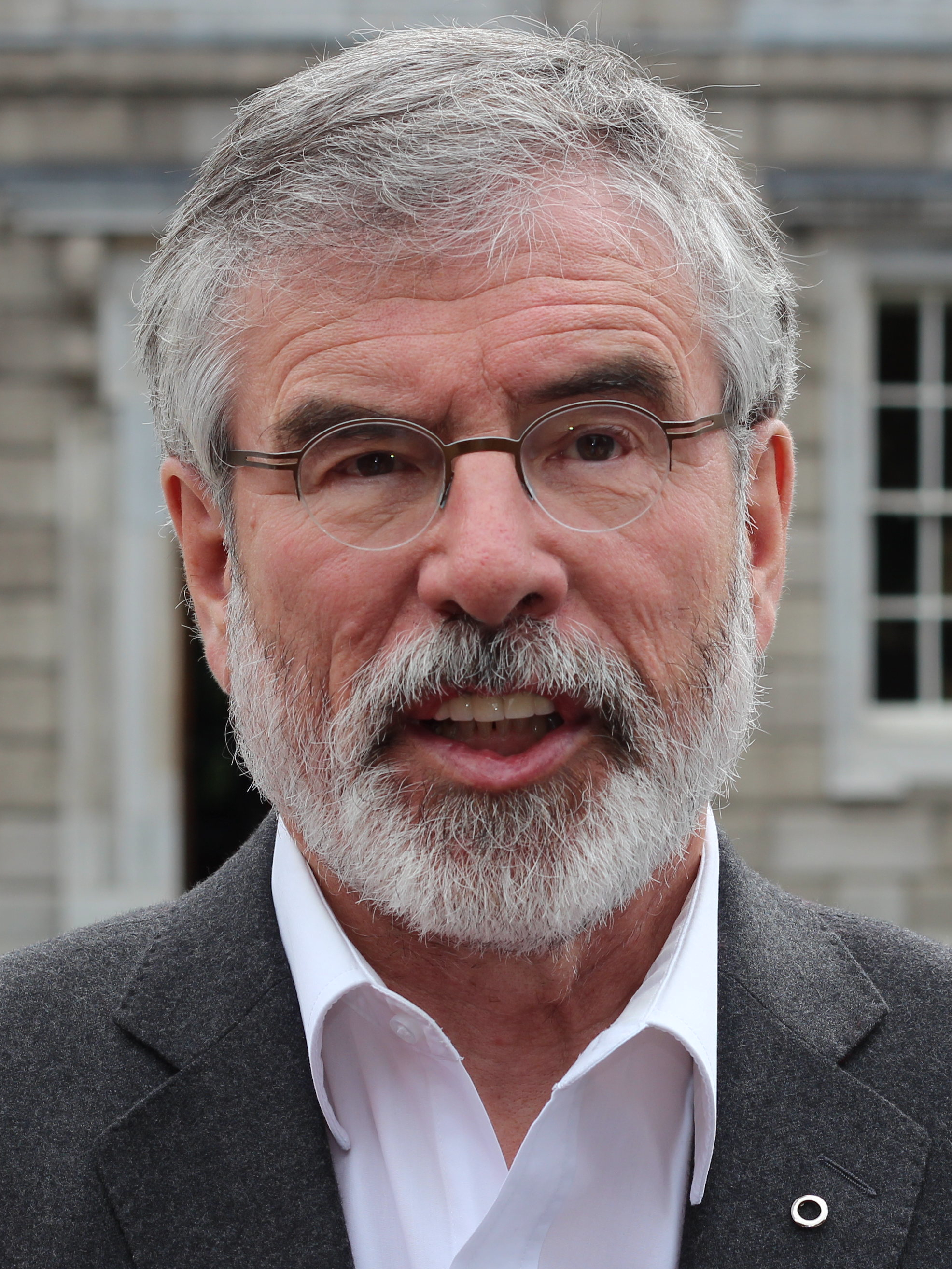

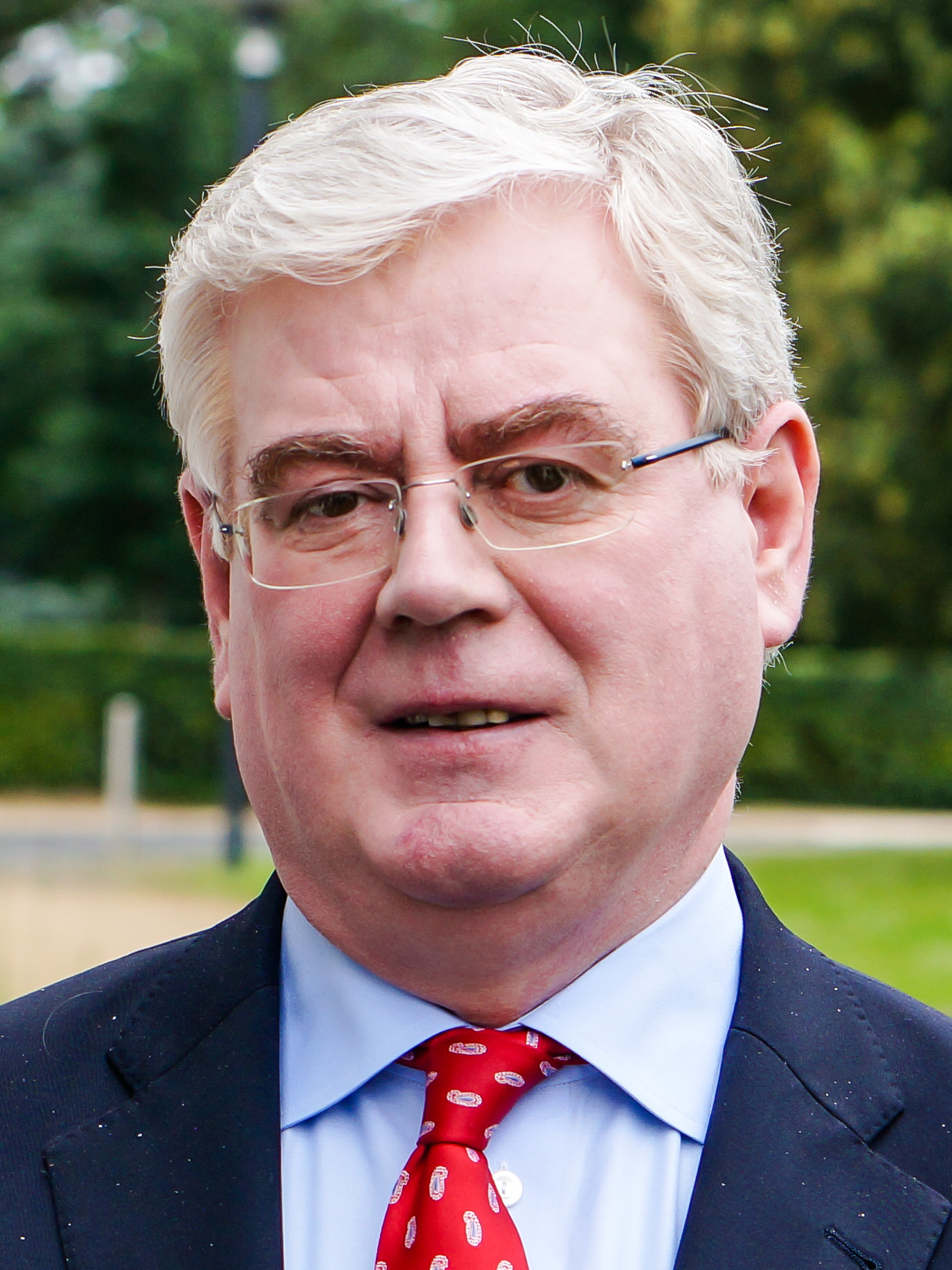

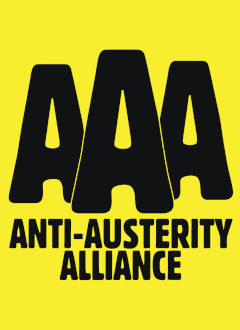

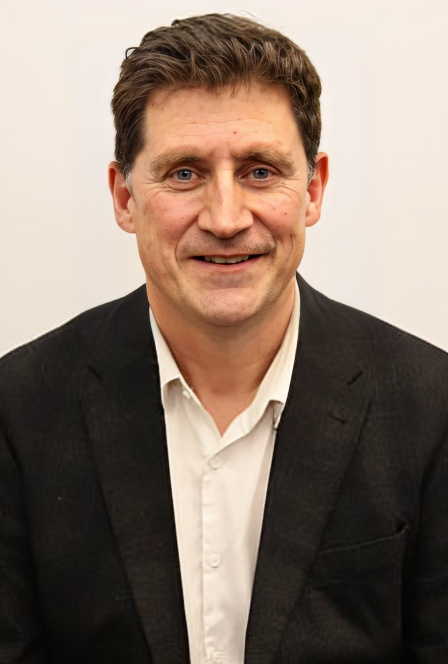
| | First party | Second party | Third party |
|---|---|---|---|
| Leader | Micheál Martin | Enda Kenny | Gerry Adams |
| Party | Fianna Fáil | Fine Gael | Sinn Féin |
| Leader since | 26 January 2011 | 2 June 2002 | 13 November 1983 |
| Seats won | 267 | 235 | 159 |
| Seat change | ▲49 | ▼105 | ▲105 |
| Percentage | 25.5% | 24.0% | 15.2% |
| Swing | ▲0.1% | ▼8.2% | ▲7.8% |
| Largest party | 19 | 7 | 4 |
| | Fourth party | Fifth party | Sixth party |
| | | PBP |
| Leader | Eamon Gilmore | — | — |
| Party | Labour | People Before Profit | Anti-Austerity Alliance |
| Leader since | September 2007 | — | — |
| Seats won | 51 | 14 | 14 |
| Seat change | ▼81 | ▲9 | ▲10 |
| Percentage | 7.2% | 1.7% | 1.2% |
| Swing | ▼7.5% | ▲0.9% | ▲0.3% |
| | Seventh party |
| Leader | Eamon Ryan |
| Party | Green |
| Leader since | 27 May 2011 |
| Seats won | 12 |
| Seat change | ▲9 |
| Percentage | 1.59% |
| Swing | ▼0.7% |

The 2014 Irish local elections were held in all local government areas of Ireland on Friday, 23 May 2014, on the same day as the European Parliament election and two by-elections (Dublin West and Longford–Westmeath). The poll in the Ballybay–Clones LEA on Monaghan County Council was deferred due to the death of a candidate.

== Administrative changes ==
These elections took place after the coming into force of the Local Government Reform Act 2014, under which city and county councils were contested under substantially redrawn local electoral area (LEA) boundaries, including an overall increase of seats to 949, up from 883 in the 2009 local elections. It also saw the abolition of borough and town councils. Municipal districts were created within counties outside of Dublin. Generally, a municipal district contained a single LEA, though a few districts around larger urban areas contain multiple LEAs.

== Overview ==
The elections took place a little over three years after the last general election, which led to a government of Fine Gael and the Labour Party. The elections were a major setback for Fine Gael and Labour. Fine Gael lost control of many councils, falling behind Fianna Fáil on some. Labour lost more than half of its local authority seats. Fianna Fáil showed a recovery, again becoming the largest party at local level with an increased share of the vote. The party also took control of some councils, while on others it formed alliances with Fine Gael. Sinn Féin was the main winner in this election, becoming the third-largest party at local level. There were also major gains for independents and smaller parties. As a result of its disastrous performance, the Labour leader Eamon Gilmore resigned.

== Opinion polls ==
Poll results are listed in the table below in reverse chronological order, showing the most recent first. Only polls conducted in the period leading up to the election and immediately afterwards are shown.

Opinion polls on voting intentions.
| Date | Source | Polling agency | Fine Gael | Labour Party | Fianna Fáil | Sinn Féin | Green Party | AAA–PBP (Note: Single party from September 2015. Includes the Socialist Party.) | Others |
|---|---|---|---|---|---|---|---|---|---|
| 7 June 2014 | Sunday Independent | Millward Brown | 20 | 5 | 20 | 26 | 2 | 2 | 25 |
| 23 May 2014 | European election | —N/a | 22.3 | 5.3 | 22.3 | 19.5 | 4.9 | 3.3 (Note: Contested as separate parties.) | 23.9 |
| 23 May 2014 | Local elections | —N/a | 24.0 | 7.2 | 25.3 | 15.2 | 1.6 | 2.9 | 25.5 |
| 19 May 2014 | Sunday Independent | Millward Brown | 20 | 6 | 21 | 23 | 2 | | 27 |
| 1 May 2014 | The Sunday Business Post | Red C | 25 | 11 | 21 | 18 | —N/a | | 25 |
| 19 April 2014 | Sunday Independent | Millward Brown | 29 | 6 | 22 | 20 | 2 | | 21 |
| 19 April 2014 | The Sunday Times | Behaviour & Attitudes | 21 | 9 | 20 | 20 | 4 | | 26 |
| 3 April 2014 | The Irish Times | Ipsos MRBI | 25 | 8 | 25 | 21 | —N/a | | 21 |
| 30 March 2014 | The Sunday Business Post | Red C | 26 | 9 | 22 | 21 | —N/a | | 22 |
| 28 February 2014 | Sunday Independent | Millward Brown | 27 | 8 | 21 | 22 | 2 | | 20 |
| 22 February 2014 | The Sunday Times | Behaviour & Attitudes | 30 | 9 | 19 | 18 | —N/a | | 24 |
| 22 February 2014 | The Sunday Business Post | Red C | 29 | 11 | 22 | 16 | —N/a | | 22 |
| 24 January 2014 | Sunday Independent | Millward Brown | 30 | 12 | 26 | 16 | 1 | | 15 |
| 22 January 2014 | The Sunday Business Post | Red C | 27 | 9 | 23 | 16 | —N/a | | 25 |
| 9 January 2014 | Paddy Power | Red C | 28 | 10 | 22 | 18 | —N/a | | 22 |
| 15 December 2013 | The Sunday Times | Behaviour & Attitudes | 30 | 11 | 21 | 15 | 3< (Note: Others figure of 24% includes 3% for the Green Party.) | | 21 |

== Results by party ==
| Party | Seats | ± | 1st pref | FPv% | ±% |
|---|---|---|---|---|---|
| Fianna Fáil | 267 | ▲49 | 430,040 | 25.20 | ▼0.2 |
| Fine Gael | 235 | ▼105 | 408,289 | 23.92 | ▼8.3 |
| Sinn Féin | 159 | ▲105 | 258,650 | 15.16 | ▲7.8 |
| Labour | 51 | ▼81 | 121,898 | 7.14 | ▼7.6 |
| People Before Profit | 14 | ▲9 | 29,051 | 1.70 | ▲0.9 |
| Anti-Austerity Alliance | 14 | ▲10 | 21,097 | 1.24 | ▲0.3 |
| Green | 12 | ▲9 | 27,168 | 1.59 | ▼0.7 |
| Workers' Party | 1 | ▼1 | 3,147 | 0.18 | ▼0.1 |
| United Left | 1 | New | 2,879 | 0.17 | New |
| SKIA | 1 | Steady | 2,139 | 0.12 | Steady |
| Workers and Unemployed | 1 | ▼1 | 1,927 | 0.11 | ▼0.1 |
| Republican Sinn Féin | 1 | Steady | 1,561 | 0.09 | Steady |
| Direct Democracy | 0 | New | 3,607 | 0.21 | New |
| Éirígí | 0 | Steady | 3,120 | 0.18 | New |
| Inds. 4 Change | 0 | New | 1,828 | 0.11 | New |
| Fís Nua | 0 | New | 930 | 0.05 | New |
| Letterkenny Residents Party | 0 | Steady | 428 | 0.03 | Steady |
| Communist | 0 | Steady | 215 | 0.01 | Steady |
| Independent | 192 | ▲70 | 388,721 | 22.78 | ▲7.1 |
| Total | 949 | ▲66 | 1,706,695 | 100% | —N/a |

Results from the Anti-Austerity Alliance are compared to the Socialist Party in the 2009 local elections. Republican Sinn Féin are not a registered party; therefore, their candidates appear on the ballot as Non-Party.

=== Detailed results by council ===
| Authority | FF | FG | SF | Lab | PBP | AAA | GP | WUA | WP | UL | RSF | SKIA | Ind. | Total | Details |
| Carlow | 5 | 6 | 3 | 2 | | | | | | | | | 2 | 18 | Details |
| Cavan | 7 | 7 | 4 | | | | | | | | | | | 18 | Details |
| Clare | 12 | 8 | 1 | | | | | | | | | | 7 | 28 | Details |
| Cork | 17 | 16 | 10 | 2 | | | | | | | | | 10 | 55 | Details |
| Cork City | 10 | 5 | 8 | | | 3 | | | 1 | | | | 4 | 31 | Details |
| Donegal | 11 | 6 | 9 | 1 | | | | | | | | | 10 | 37 | Details |
| Dublin City | 9 | 8 | 16 | 8 | 5 | 1 | 3 | | | 1 | | | 12 | 63 | Details |
| Dún Laoghaire–Rathdown | 8 | 11 | 3 | 7 | 3 | | 2 | | | | | | 6 | 40 | Details |
| Fingal | 7 | 6 | 6 | 4 | 1 | 4 | 2 | | | | | | 10 | 40 | Details |
| Galway | 12 | 12 | 3 | | | | | | | | 1 (Note: Republican Sinn Féin is an unregistered party; therefore Curraoin appears on official lists as non-Party.) | | 11 | 39 | Details |
| Galway City | 3 | 4 | 3 | 2 | | | | | | | | | 6 | 18 | Details |
| Kerry | 9 | 9 | 5 | 2 | | | | | | | | 1 | 7 | 33 | Details |
| Kildare | 12 | 9 | 5 | 5 | | | | | | | | | 9 | 40 | Details |
| Kilkenny | 10 | 7 | 3 | 2 | | | 1 | | | | | | 1 | 24 | Details |
| Laois | 7 | 6 | 2 | 1 | | | | | | | | | 3 | 19 | Details |
| Leitrim | 6 | 4 | 4 | | | | | | | | | | 4 | 18 | Details |
| Limerick | 13 | 12 | 6 | 3 | | 3 | | | | | | | 3 | 40 | Details |
| Longford | 7 | 8 | | | | | | | | | | | 3 | 18 | Details |
| Louth | 5 | 7 | 10 | 2 | | | 2 | | | | | | 3 | 29 | Details |
| Mayo | 10 | 10 | 3 | | | | | | | | | | 7 | 30 | Details |
| Meath | 10 | 13 | 8 | | | | | | | | | | 9 | 40 | Details |
| Monaghan | 4 | 5 | 7 | | | | | | | | | | 2 | 18 | Details |
| Offaly | 8 | 3 | 3 | | | | | | | | | | 5 | 19 | Details |
| Roscommon | 8 | 3 | 1 | | | | | | | | | | 6 | 18 | Details |
| Sligo | 8 | 3 | 2 | | 1 | | | | | | | | 4 | 18 | Details |
| South Dublin | 5 | 7 | 9 | 4 | 3 | 3 | 1 | | | | | | 8 | 40 | Details |
| Tipperary | 10 | 10 | 5 | 1 | | | | 1 | | | | | 13 | 40 | Details |
| Waterford | 8 | 8 | 6 | 1 | | | | | | | | | 9 | 32 | Details |
| Westmeath | 8 | 5 | 3 | 2 | | | | | | | | | 2 | 20 | Details |
| Wexford | 11 | 9 | 5 | 2 | 1 | | | | | | | | 6 | 34 | Details |
| Wicklow | 7 | 8 | 6 | | | | 1 | | | | | | 10 | 32 | Details |
| Total | 267 | 235 | 159 | 51 | 14 | 14 | 12 | 1 | 1 | 1 | 1 | 1 | 192 | 949 | |

=== Largest parties by council ===
| Council | 1st party 2009 | 2nd party 2009 | 1st party 2014 | 2nd party 2014 | Councillors |
|---|---|---|---|---|---|
| Carlow | Fine Gael (10) | Labour (5) | Fine Gael (6) | Fianna Fáil (5) | 18 |
| Cavan | Fine Gael (13) | Fianna Fáil (8) | Tied – FF/FG (7) | | 18 |
| Clare | Fine Gael (12) | Fianna Fáil (11) | Fianna Fáil (12) | Fine Gael (8) | 28 |
| Cork | Fine Gael (22) | Fianna Fáil (12) | Fianna Fáil (17) | Fine Gael (16) | 55 |
| Cork City | Fine Gael (8) | Labour (7) | Fianna Fáil (10) | Sinn Féin (8) | 31 |
| Donegal | Fianna Fáil (10) | Fine Gael (8) | Fianna Fáil (11) | Independent (10) | 37 |
| Dublin City | Labour (19) | Fine Gael (12) | Sinn Féin (16) | Independent (12) | 63 |
| Dún Laoghaire–Rathdown | Fine Gael (11) | Labour (8) | Fine Gael (11) | Fianna Fáil (8) | 40 |
| Fingal | Labour (9) | Fine Gael (6) | Independent (10) | Fianna Fáil (7) | 40 |
| Galway | Fine Gael (13) | Independent (8) | Tied – FF/FG (12) | | 39 |
| Galway City | Labour (5) | Independent (4) | Independent (6) | Fine Gael (4) | 18 |
| Kerry | Fine Gael (10) | Fianna Fáil (7) | Tied – FF/FG (9) | | 33 |
| Kildare | Fine Gael (9) | Tied | Fianna Fáil (12) | Tied | 40 |
| Kilkenny | Fine Gael (12) | Fianna Fáil (7) | Fianna Fáil (10) | Fine Gael (7) | 24 |
| Laois | Fine Gael (12) | Fianna Fáil (8) | Fianna Fáil (7) | Fine Gael (6) | 19 |
| Leitrim | Fine Gael (10) | Fianna Fáil (8) | Fianna Fáil (6) | Tied | 18 |
| Limerick | New | | Fianna Fáil (13) | Fine Gael (12) | 40 |
| Longford | Fine Gael (10) | Fianna Fáil (8) | Fine Gael (8) | Fianna Fáil (7) | 18 |
| Louth | Fine Gael (8) | Sinn Féin (6) | Sinn Féin (10) | Fine Gael (7) | 29 |
| Mayo | Fine Gael (17) | Fianna Fáil (7) | Tied – FF/FG (10) | | 30 |
| Meath | Fine Gael (11) | Fianna Fáil (8) | Fine Gael (13) | Fianna Fáil (10) | 40 |
| Monaghan | Sinn Féin (7) | Fine Gael (6) | Sinn Féin (7) | Fine Gael (5) | 18 |
| Offaly | Fianna Fáil (9) | Tied | Fianna Fáil (8) | Independent (5) | 19 |
| Roscommon | Fine Gael (10) | Fianna Fáil (8) | Fianna Fáil (8) | Independent (6) | 18 |
| Sligo | Fine Gael (12) | Fianna Fáil (7) | Fianna Fáil (8) | Independent (4) | 18 |
| South Dublin | Labour (9) | Fine Gael (8) | Sinn Féin (10) | Independent (8) | 40 |
| Tipperary | New | | Independent (13) | Tied | 40 |
| Waterford | New | | Independent (9) | Tied | 32 |
| Westmeath | Fianna Fáil (9) | Fine Gael (8) | Fianna Fáil (8) | Fine Gael (5) | 20 |
| Wexford | Fine Gael (10) | Fianna Fáil (5) | Fianna Fáil (11) | Fine Gael (9) | 34 |
| Wicklow | Fine Gael (9) | Labour (6) | Independent (10) | Fine Gael (8) | 32 |
| All Councils | Fine Gael (340) | Fianna Fáil (218) | Fianna Fáil (267) | Fine Gael (235) | 949 |
