= Joe Neville (politician) =

Irish politician

Joe Neville TD
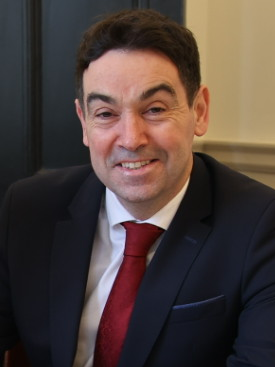
- Neville in 2024

Teachta Dála
- Incumbent
- Assumed office November 2024
- Constituency: Kildare North

Personal details
- Born: 1978/1979 (age 46–47)
- Party: Fine Gael
- Spouse: Caroline Neville
- Children: 3
- Education: University College Dublin

Joseph Neville (born 1978/1979) is an Irish Fine Gael politician who has been a Teachta Dála (TD) for the Kildare North constituency since the 2024 general election.

Neville was a member of Kildare County Council from 2014 to 2024, for the Leixlip area. He was mayor of County Kildare in 2024.

He is a qualified chartered accountant, having trained with PwC. He has worked with various corporations as a financial controller, including Dublin Airport Authority, and Kerry Group. He works as the CFO of Swyft Energy as of 2024.

He lives in Leixlip, County Kildare, with his wife Caroline and their three children.

Dáil	Election	Deputy (Party)	Deputy (Party)	Deputy (Party)	Deputy (Party)	Deputy (Party)
28th	1997	Emmet Stagg (Lab)	Charlie McCreevy (FF)	Bernard Durkan (FG)	3 seats until 2007	
29th	2002	Emmet Stagg (Lab)	Charlie McCreevy (FF)	Bernard Durkan (FG)	3 seats until 2007	
29th	2005 by-election	Emmet Stagg (Lab)	Catherine Murphy (Ind.)	Bernard Durkan (FG)	3 seats until 2007	
30th	2007	Emmet Stagg (Lab)	Áine Brady (FF)	Bernard Durkan (FG)	Michael Fitzpatrick (FF)	4 seats until 2024
31st	2011	Emmet Stagg (Lab)	Catherine Murphy (Ind.)	Bernard Durkan (FG)	Anthony Lawlor (FG)	4 seats until 2024
32nd	2016	Frank O'Rourke (FF)	Catherine Murphy (SD)	Bernard Durkan (FG)	James Lawless (FF)	4 seats until 2024
33rd	2020	Réada Cronin (SF)	Catherine Murphy (SD)	Bernard Durkan (FG)	James Lawless (FF)	4 seats until 2024
34th	2024	Réada Cronin (SF)	Aidan Farrelly (SD)	Joe Neville (FG)	James Lawless (FF)	Naoise Ó Cearúil (FF)
