= Jack Wall (politician) =

Irish former politician (born 1945)

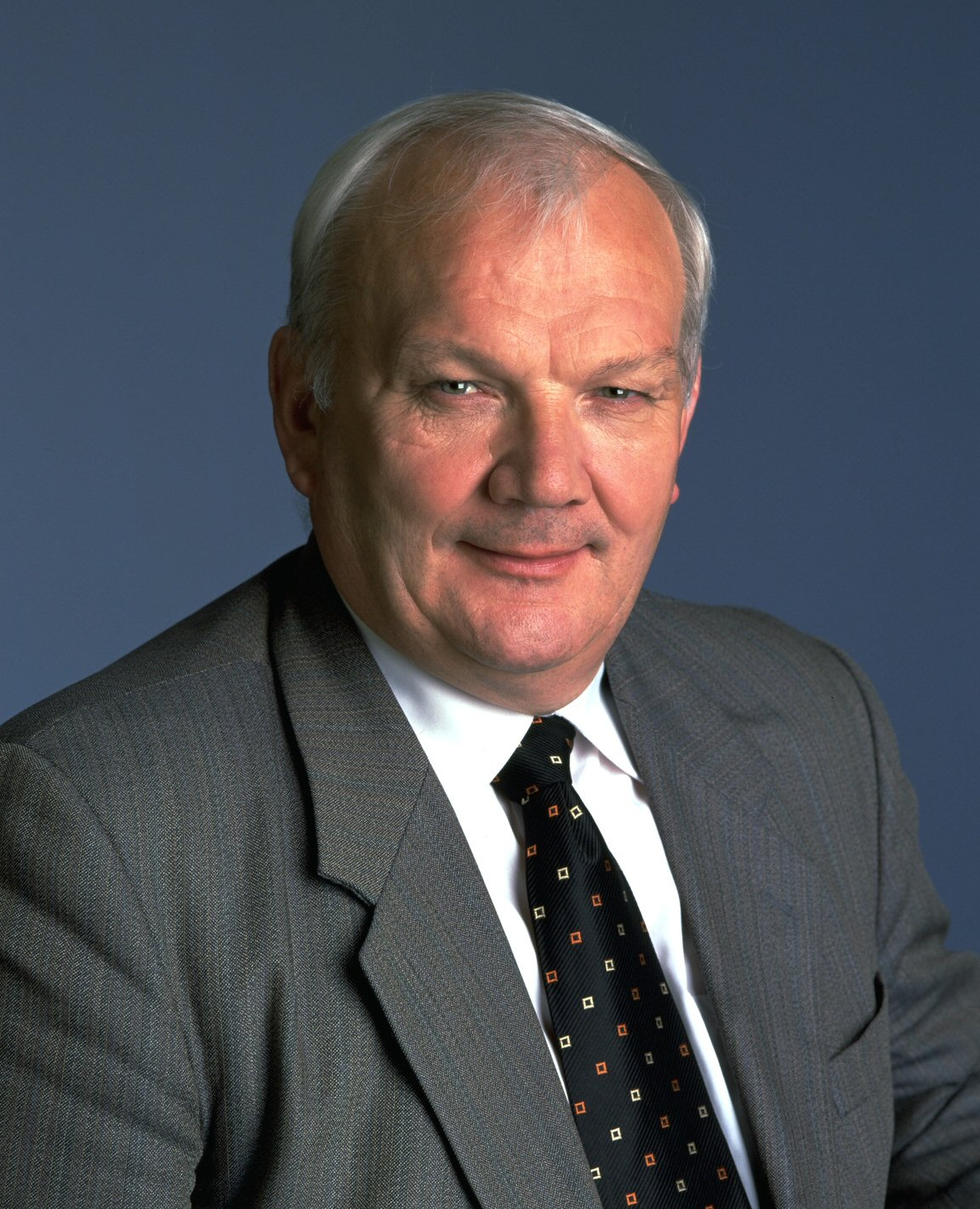
- Wall, c. 2002

Teachta Dála
- In office June 1997 – February 2016
- Constituency: Kildare South

Senator
- In office 17 February 1993 – 6 June 1997
- Constituency: Nominated by the Taoiseach

Personal details
- Born: 1 July 1945 (age 80) Castledermot, County Kildare, Ireland
- Party: Labour Party
- Spouse: Anne Byrne
- Children: 4, including Mark

Jack Wall (born 1 July 1945) is an Irish former Labour Party politician who served as a Teachta Dála (TD) for the Kildare South constituency from 1997 to 2016 and a Senator from 1993 to 1997, after being nominated by the Taoiseach.

Wall was born in Castledermot, County Kildare in 1945. He was educated at Castledermot national school and Castledermot vocational school. He worked as an electrician before entering into local politics in 1991 when he was elected to Athy Town Council and Kildare County Council.

In 1993, Wall was nominated to Seanad Éireann. He was elected to Dáil Éireann as a Labour Party TD for Kildare South at the 1997 general election, and was re-elected at each subsequent general election until his retirement in 2016. He previously served as Labour Party Spokesperson for Agriculture, Defence and Arts, Sport and Tourism, and also for Community and Rural Affairs.

He was the chairperson of the Parliamentary Labour Party from 2007 to 2016.

On 10 July 2015, he announced that he would not be contesting the 2016 general election. Following the 2024 Irish general election, Wall's son Mark was elected to represent Kildare South.

Dáil	Election	Deputy (Party)	Deputy (Party)	Deputy (Party)	Deputy (Party)
28th	1997	Jack Wall (Lab)	Alan Dukes (FG)	Seán Power (FF)	3 seats 1997–2020
29th	2002	Jack Wall (Lab)	Seán Ó Fearghaíl (FF)	Seán Power (FF)	3 seats 1997–2020
30th	2007	Jack Wall (Lab)	Seán Ó Fearghaíl (FF)	Seán Power (FF)	3 seats 1997–2020
31st	2011	Jack Wall (Lab)	Seán Ó Fearghaíl (FF)	Martin Heydon (FG)	3 seats 1997–2020
32nd	2016	Fiona O'Loughlin (FF)	Seán Ó Fearghaíl (FF)	Martin Heydon (FG)	3 seats 1997–2020
33rd	2020	Cathal Berry (Ind.)	Seán Ó Fearghaíl (FF)	Martin Heydon (FG)	Patricia Ryan (SF)
34th	2024	Mark Wall (Lab)	Seán Ó Fearghaíl (FF)	Martin Heydon (FG)	Shónagh Ní Raghallaigh (SF)
