= Fiona O'Loughlin =

Fiona O'Loughlin may refer to:

- Fiona O'Loughlin (comedian) (born 1963), Australian comedian
- Fiona O'Loughlin (politician), Irish politician
