= Patricia Ryan (politician) =

Irish politician (born 1969)

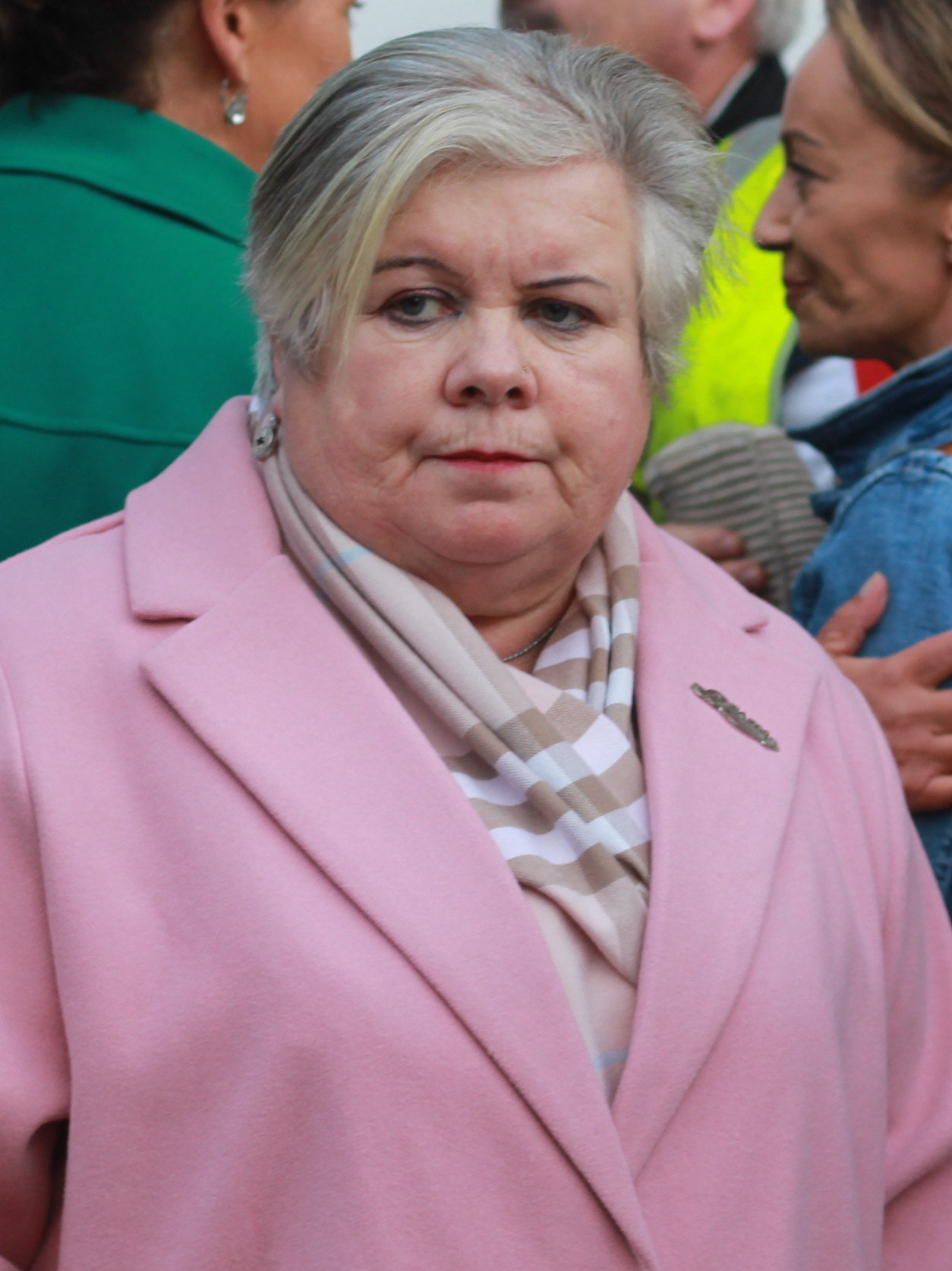
- Ryan in 2022

Teachta Dála
- In office February 2020 – November 2024
- Constituency: Kildare South

Personal details
- Born: 3 March 1969 (age 57) Ballybrittas, County Laois, Ireland
- Party: Independent
- Other political affiliations: Sinn Féin (until 2024)

Patricia Ryan (born 3 March 1969) is an Irish former independent and Sinn Féin politician who served as a Teachta Dála (TD) for the Kildare South constituency from 2020 to 2024.

Previous to entering politics, Ryan was a trade union shop steward. Between 2019 and 2020 Ryan was a member of Kildare County Council.

At the 2020 general election, Ryan topped the poll in Kildare South, despite taking a holiday during the campaign instead of canvassing.

In December 2020, Ryan was criticised for having promoted 9/11 conspiracy theories on her Facebook page back in 2015, including a post encouraging people to read a website that stated the US government detonated the Twin Towers in a false flag operation. Ryan later stated "I apologise for this Facebook post. It is not reflective of my views".

In August 2022 Ryan contacted her constituents by post to warn them of potential “significant conflict” between themselves and Ukrainian refugees fleeing the Russo-Ukrainian War if modular homes were allowed to be built in Newbridge. Ryan's letter stated "There is a concern that growing levels of homelessness and pending evictions in the areas where the modular units are being proposed could generate conflict...If this process is not managed right and the views of locally based representatives are not listened to, the potential for significant conflict with host communities is significant, which in turn could be exploited by small far-right elements". Senator Vincent Martin, also based in Kildare, expressed concerned that parts of the letter left "itself open to mixed messaging which has the potential to whip up a cold atmosphere of fear in the local community" The Minister for Integration Roderic O'Gorman stated the modular homes were only a temporary measure being created to meet demand and that his department would engage with communities about any issues concerning refugees.

On 9 October 2024, Ryan resigned from Sinn Féin. At the 2024 general election Ryan lost her seat, securing just 678 first preference votes, a 93% drop in votes compared to her 2020 result.

Dáil	Election	Deputy (Party)	Deputy (Party)	Deputy (Party)	Deputy (Party)
28th	1997	Jack Wall (Lab)	Alan Dukes (FG)	Seán Power (FF)	3 seats 1997–2020
29th	2002	Jack Wall (Lab)	Seán Ó Fearghaíl (FF)	Seán Power (FF)	3 seats 1997–2020
30th	2007	Jack Wall (Lab)	Seán Ó Fearghaíl (FF)	Seán Power (FF)	3 seats 1997–2020
31st	2011	Jack Wall (Lab)	Seán Ó Fearghaíl (FF)	Martin Heydon (FG)	3 seats 1997–2020
32nd	2016	Fiona O'Loughlin (FF)	Seán Ó Fearghaíl (FF)	Martin Heydon (FG)	3 seats 1997–2020
33rd	2020	Cathal Berry (Ind.)	Seán Ó Fearghaíl (FF)	Martin Heydon (FG)	Patricia Ryan (SF)
34th	2024	Mark Wall (Lab)	Seán Ó Fearghaíl (FF)	Martin Heydon (FG)	Shónagh Ní Raghallaigh (SF)
