= Cathal Berry =

Irish politician and former Army officer

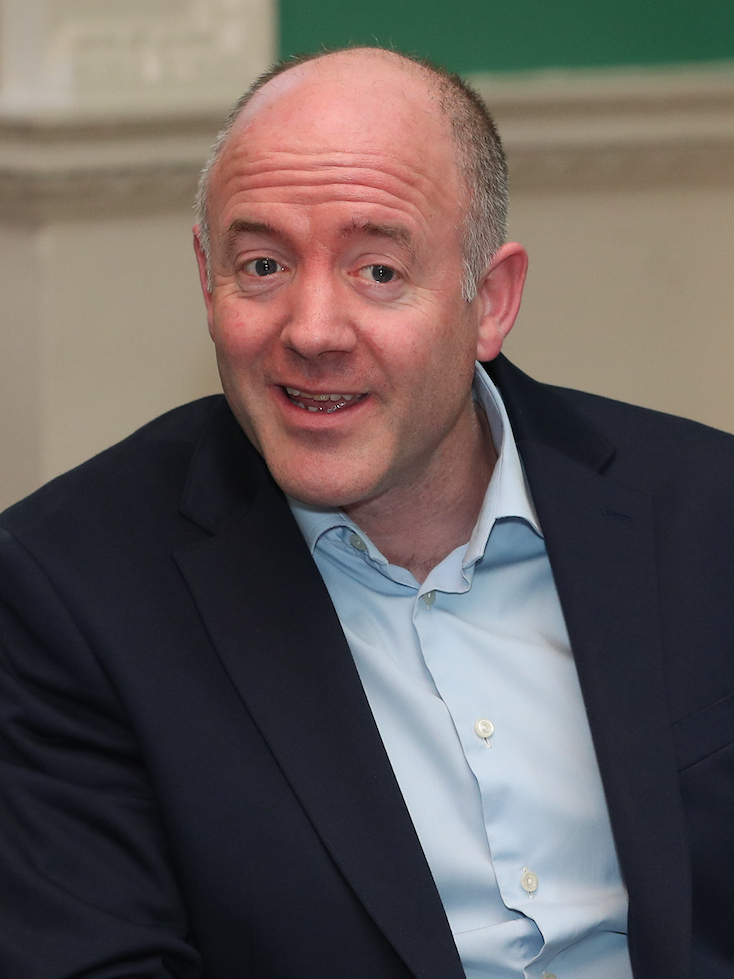
- Berry in 2022

Teachta Dála
- In office February 2020 – November 2024
- Constituency: Kildare South

Personal details
- Born: 1977/1978 (age 48–49) Waterford, Ireland
- Party: Independent
- Education: NUI Galway; Royal College of Surgeons; NUI Maynooth
- Website: cathalberry.com

Military service
- Allegiance: Ireland
- Branch/service: Army; Infantry Corps
- Years of service: 1995–2019
- Rank: Commandant
- Unit: Army Ranger Wing
- Commands: Head of Military Medical School; Deputy Commander ARW

Cathal Berry (born 1977/1978) is an Irish former independent politician and retired soldier who was a Teachta Dála (TD) for the Kildare South constituency from 2020 to 2024.

== Military service ==
Originally from Ballyduff, County Waterford, Berry joined the army at the age of 18. Berry was a career Line Infantry officer and served for six years as the second-in-command of the Army Ranger Wing, Ireland's special operations unit, before qualifying as a medical doctor and becoming the head of the Military Medical School of the Irish Defence Forces. He deployed overseas five times, with NATO in Kosovo, the EU in Chad and the UN in the Middle East (Lebanon).

Berry came to public attention in 2019, unusual for a soldier, particularly with service in the ARW, when upon retiring after 23 years in the Defence Forces, he spoke to the media about poor pay and conditions within the military and the disillusionment of military personnel with the perceived dysfunctional relationship between the military authorities and the Department of Defence.

Berry called for the resignation of Paul Kehoe, Minister of State at the Department of Defence from 2011 to 2020, whom he described as an "empty suit" who has "presided over the demise of the Defence Forces".

== Education ==
Berry holds a bachelor's degree in Science and Master of Law in Peace Support Operations and International Humanitarian Law from NUI Galway, a Bachelor of Medicine, Obstetrics and Surgery from the Royal College of Surgeons in Ireland as well as qualifications in French language, and leadership, management and defence studies from NUI Maynooth.

== Political career ==
Berry was elected to Dáil Éireann as an independent TD for the Kildare South constituency at the 2020 general election. His campaign platform was "health, housing, the environment, education and Defence Force families".

He lost his seat at the 2024 general election. He unsuccessfully contested the 2025 Seanad election.

| Dáil | Election | Deputy (Party) | Deputy (Party) | Deputy (Party) | Deputy (Party) |
|---|---|---|---|---|---|
| 28th | 1997 | Jack Wall (Lab) | Alan Dukes (FG) | Seán Power (FF) | 3 seats 1997–2020 |
| 29th | 2002 | Jack Wall (Lab) | Seán Ó Fearghaíl (FF) | Seán Power (FF) | 3 seats 1997–2020 |
| 30th | 2007 | Jack Wall (Lab) | Seán Ó Fearghaíl (FF) | Seán Power (FF) | 3 seats 1997–2020 |
| 31st | 2011 | Jack Wall (Lab) | Seán Ó Fearghaíl (FF) | Martin Heydon (FG) | 3 seats 1997–2020 |
| 32nd | 2016 | Fiona O'Loughlin (FF) | Seán Ó Fearghaíl (FF) | Martin Heydon (FG) | 3 seats 1997–2020 |
| 33rd | 2020 | Cathal Berry (Ind.) | Seán Ó Fearghaíl (FF) | Martin Heydon (FG) | Patricia Ryan (SF) |
| 34th | 2024 | Mark Wall (Lab) | Seán Ó Fearghaíl (FF) | Martin Heydon (FG) | Shónagh Ní Raghallaigh (SF) |
