= Martin Heydon =

Irish politician (born 1978)

Martin Heydon TD
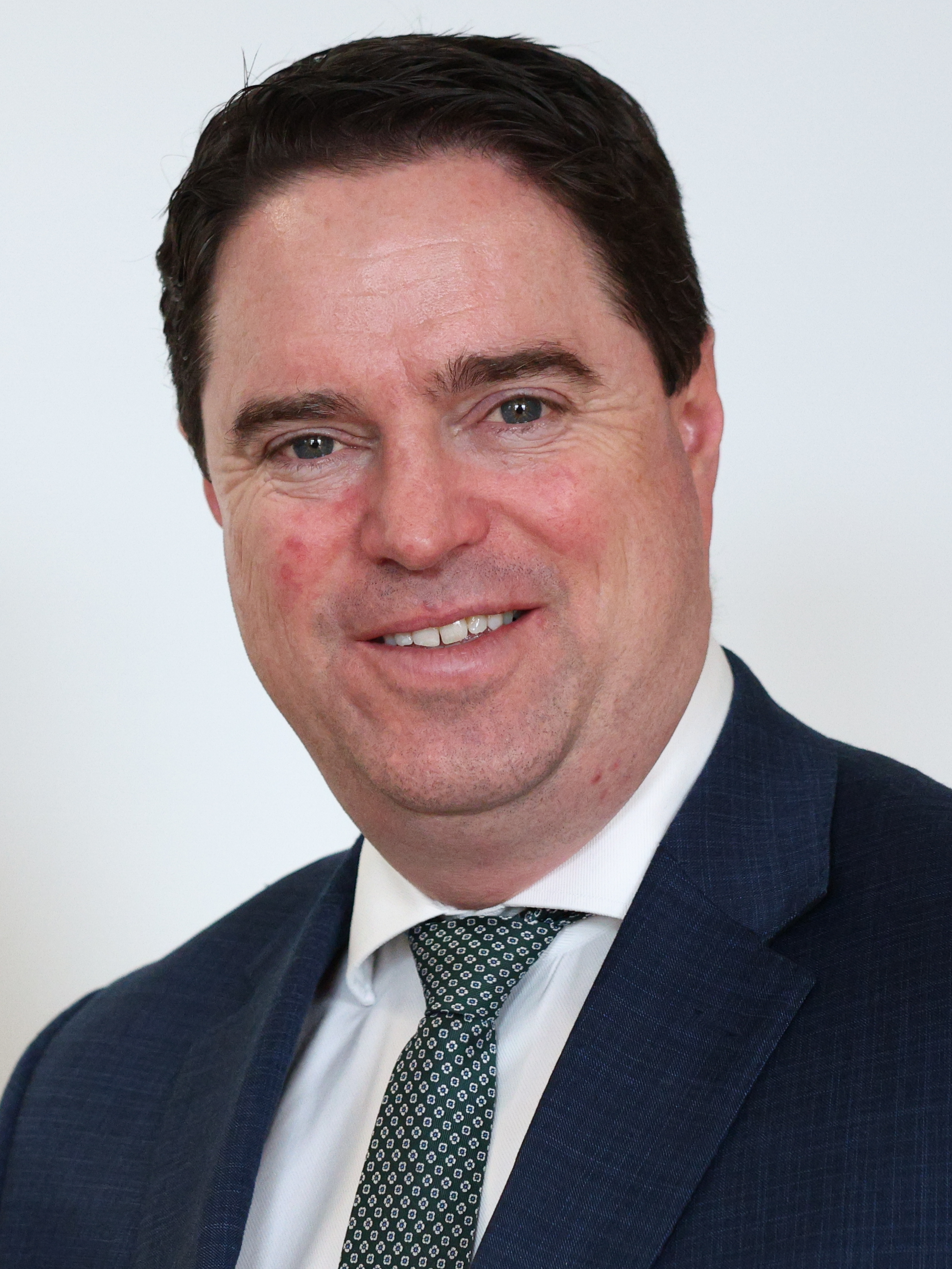
- Heydon in 2026

Minister for Agriculture, Food and the Marine
- Incumbent
- Assumed office 23 January 2025
- Taoiseach: Micheál Martin
- Preceded by: Charlie McConalogue

Minister of State
- 2020–2025: Agriculture, Food and the Marine

Chair of the Fine Gael parliamentary party
- In office 1 March 2016 – 1 July 2020
- Leader: Enda Kenny; Leo Varadkar
- Preceded by: Dan Neville
- Succeeded by: Richard Bruton

Teachta Dála
- Incumbent
- Assumed office February 2011
- Constituency: Kildare South

Personal details
- Born: 9 August 1978 (age 48) Portlaoise, County Laois, Ireland
- Party: Fine Gael
- Spouse: Brianne Leahy (m. 2009)
- Children: 4
- Education: Kildalton Agricultural College
- Website: martinheydon.com

Martin Heydon (born 9 August 1978) is an Irish Fine Gael politician who has served as Minister for Agriculture, Food and the Marine since January 2025. He has been a Teachta Dála (TD) for the Kildare South constituency since 2011. He previously served as Minister of State at the Department of Agriculture, Food and the Marine from 2020 to 2025 and the Chair of the Fine Gael parliamentary party from 2016 to 2020.

== Early life ==
Heydon is a native of South County Kildare and lives outside of Kilcullen town, owning a family farm. He was educated in Crookstown National School, Cross and Passion College Kilcullen and Teagasc Kildalton Agricultural College in County Kilkenny.

== Political career ==
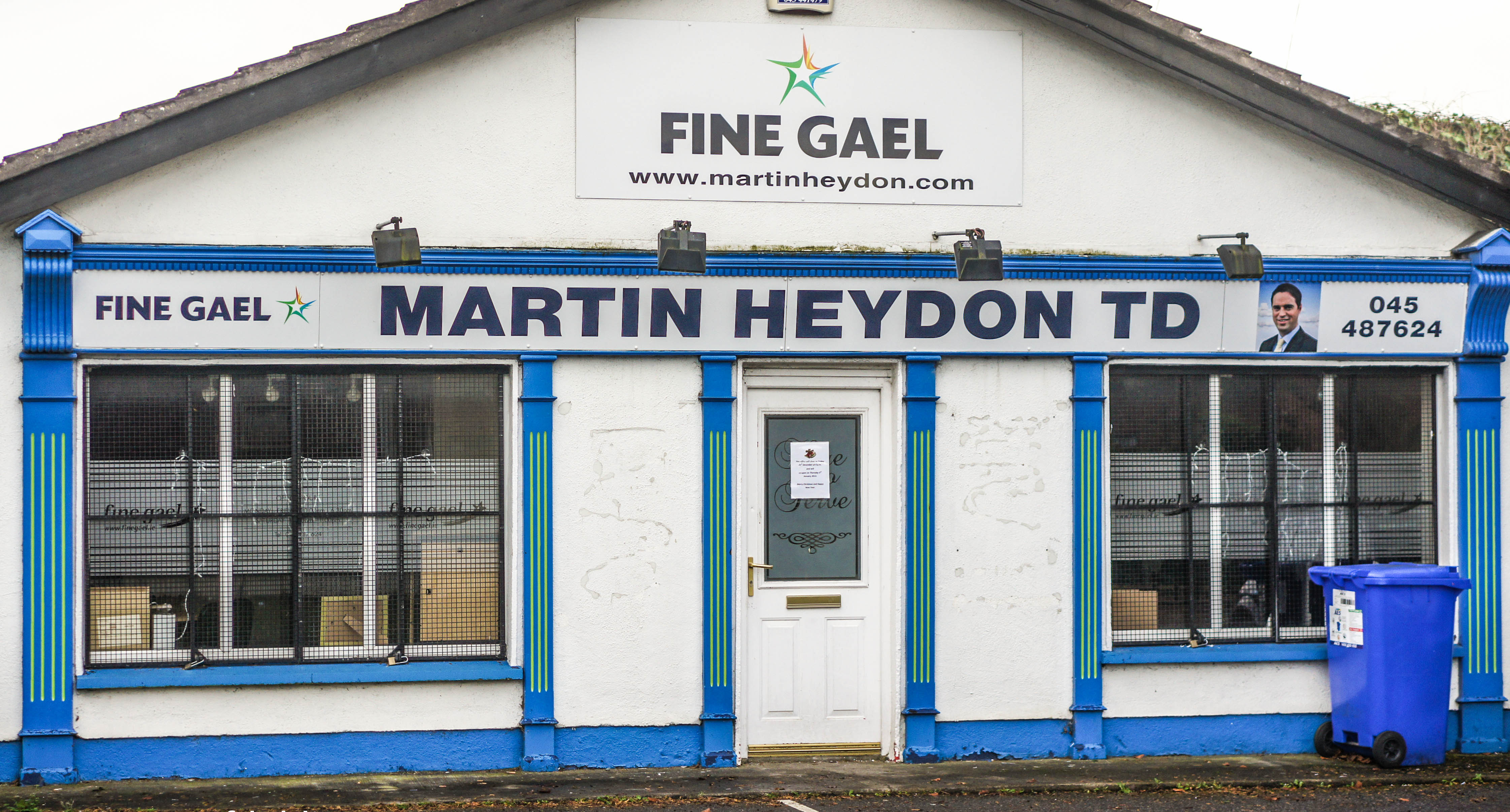
Heydon's constituency office in Newbridge

Heydon joined Fine Gael in 2008. He was elected at the 2009 Kildare County Council election on his first attempt. In February 2011, following his election to the Dáil, he was replaced on Kildare County Council by Ivan Keatley.

At the 2011 general election, Heydon contested Kildare South and polled over 12,000 votes, being elected on the first count, more than 3,000 votes over the quota. Fine Gael had been unrepresented in the constituency since Alan Dukes had lost his seat in 2002.

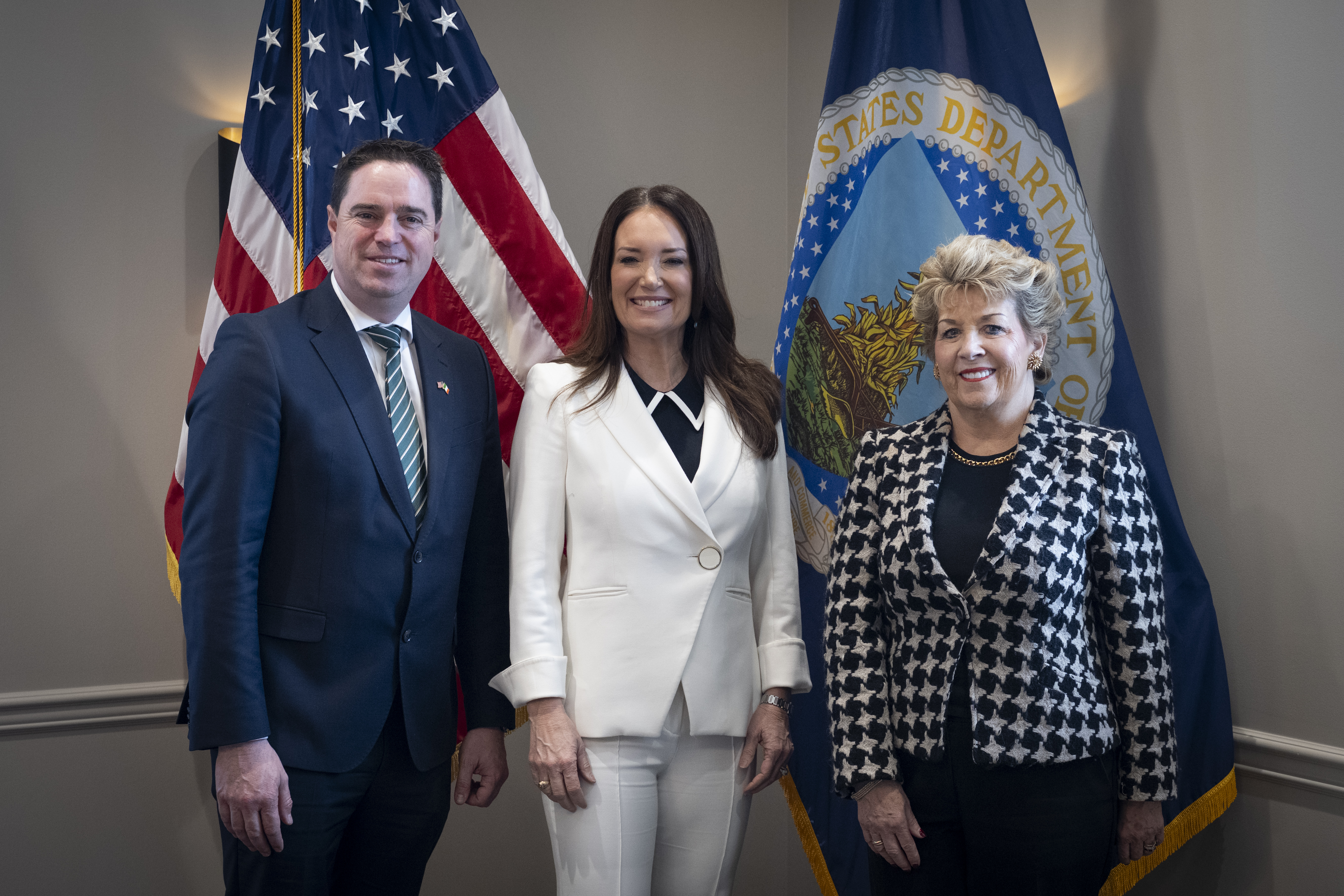
Heydon with US Agriculture Secretary Brooke Rollins and Geraldine Byrne Nason in April 2025

He served as Chair of Fine Gael's Internal Committee on Agriculture and Rural Affairs between 2011 and 2016.

Newbridge Fine Gael Councillor Fiona McLoughlin Healy was added to the ticket for the 2016 general election as his running mate. Heydon won re-election, topping the poll in Kildare South.

On 8 June 2016, Heydon was elected Chair of the Fine Gael parliamentary party, succeeding retired Limerick TD Dan Neville. Heydon's responsibilities in this role included chairing the weekly meeting of the party's TDs, Senators and MEPs.

In July 2020, following the formation of the government of the 33rd Dáil, Heydon was appointed Minister of State at the Department of Agriculture, Food and the Marine with responsibility for Research and Development, Farm Safety and New Market Development.

On 23 January 2025, Heydon was appointed as Minister for Agriculture, Food and the Marine in the government led by Micheál Martin, following the 2024 general election.

== Personal life ==
Heydon is married to pharmacist and former ladies' GAA All-Star Brianne Leahy. The couple have three sons and a daughter.

He is an officer of his local Gaelic football club, St Laurence's GAA.

Political offices
Preceded by Andrew Doyle	Minister of State at the Department of Agriculture, Food and the Marine; 2020–2025	Succeeded by Noel Grealish
Preceded by Charlie McConalogue as Minister for Agriculture, Food and the Marine	Minister for Agriculture, Food and the Marine; 2025–present	Incumbent
Party political offices
Preceded by Dan Neville	Chair of the Fine Gael parliamentary party 2016–2020	Succeeded by Richard Bruton

Dáil	Election	Deputy (Party)	Deputy (Party)	Deputy (Party)	Deputy (Party)
28th	1997	Jack Wall (Lab)	Alan Dukes (FG)	Seán Power (FF)	3 seats 1997–2020
29th	2002	Jack Wall (Lab)	Seán Ó Fearghaíl (FF)	Seán Power (FF)	3 seats 1997–2020
30th	2007	Jack Wall (Lab)	Seán Ó Fearghaíl (FF)	Seán Power (FF)	3 seats 1997–2020
31st	2011	Jack Wall (Lab)	Seán Ó Fearghaíl (FF)	Martin Heydon (FG)	3 seats 1997–2020
32nd	2016	Fiona O'Loughlin (FF)	Seán Ó Fearghaíl (FF)	Martin Heydon (FG)	3 seats 1997–2020
33rd	2020	Cathal Berry (Ind.)	Seán Ó Fearghaíl (FF)	Martin Heydon (FG)	Patricia Ryan (SF)
34th	2024	Mark Wall (Lab)	Seán Ó Fearghaíl (FF)	Martin Heydon (FG)	Shónagh Ní Raghallaigh (SF)
