= Fiona O'Loughlin (politician) =

Irish politician (born 1965)

Senator Fiona O'Loughlin
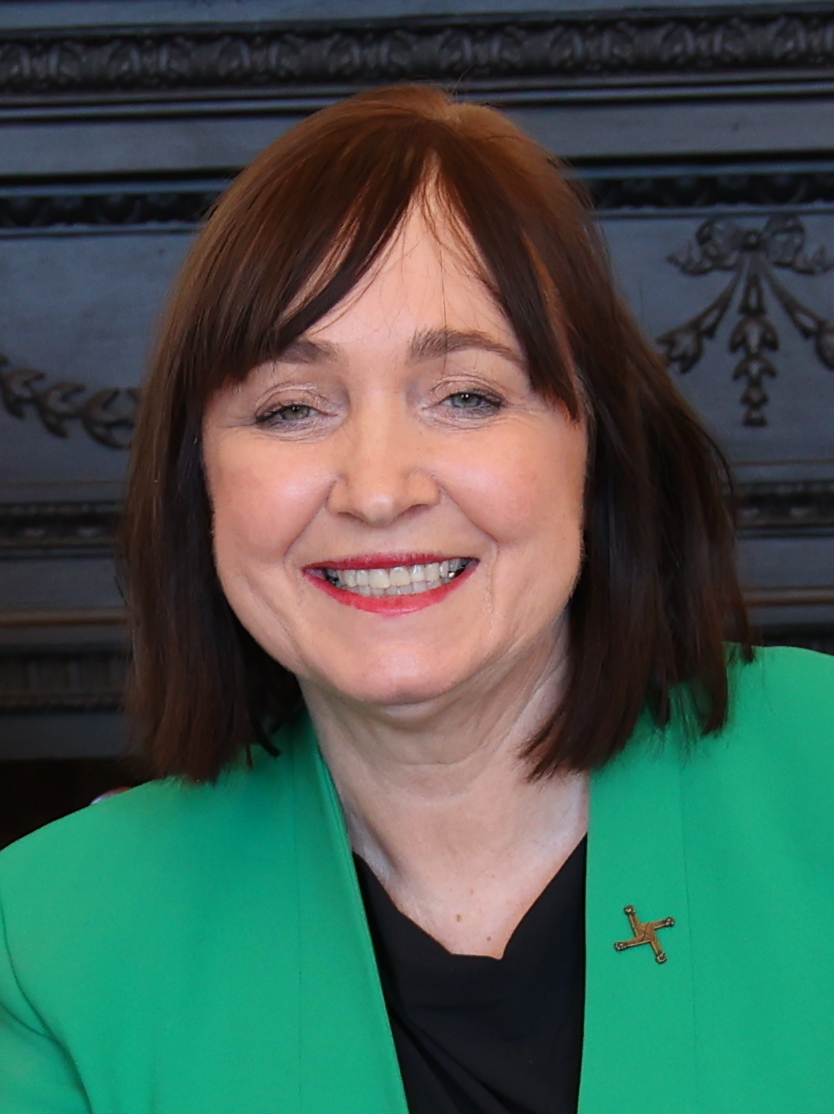
- O'Loughlin in 2025

Deputy leader of the Seanad
- Incumbent
- Assumed office 12 February 2025
- Taoiseach: Micheál Martin
- Leader: Seán Kyne
- Preceded by: Lisa Chambers

Leader of Fianna Fáil in the Seanad
- Incumbent
- Assumed office 12 February 2025
- Leader: Micheál Martin
- Preceded by: Lisa Chambers

Senator
- Incumbent
- Assumed office 29 June 2020
- Constituency: Administrative Panel

Chair of the Committee on Education and Social Protection
- In office 4 April 2016 – 10 February 2020
- Preceded by: Joanna Tuffy
- Succeeded by: Denis Naughten

Teachta Dála
- In office February 2016 – February 2020
- Constituency: Kildare South

Personal details
- Born: 8 September 1965 (age 60) Rathangan, County Kildare, Ireland
- Party: Fianna Fáil
- Education: Dublin Institute of Technology
- Website: fionaoloughlin.ie

Fiona O'Loughlin (born 8 September 1965) is an Irish Fianna Fáil politician who has been a senator for the Administrative Panel since June 2020. She previously served as a Teachta Dála (TD) for the Kildare South constituency from 2016 to 2020. She also served as Chair of the Committee on Education and Social Protection from 2016 to 2020.

She was a member of Kildare County Council from 1999 to 2016.

She lost her Dáil seat at the 2020 general election. In April 2020, O'Loughlin was elected as a senator for the Administrative Panel. She was an unsuccessful candidate for Kildare South at the 2024 general election.

In September 2020, she was named as Chairperson of the Irish delegation to the Parliamentary Assembly of the Council of Europe. She is the Fianna Fáil Seanad spokesperson on Education.

Dáil	Election	Deputy (Party)	Deputy (Party)	Deputy (Party)	Deputy (Party)
28th	1997	Jack Wall (Lab)	Alan Dukes (FG)	Seán Power (FF)	3 seats 1997–2020
29th	2002	Jack Wall (Lab)	Seán Ó Fearghaíl (FF)	Seán Power (FF)	3 seats 1997–2020
30th	2007	Jack Wall (Lab)	Seán Ó Fearghaíl (FF)	Seán Power (FF)	3 seats 1997–2020
31st	2011	Jack Wall (Lab)	Seán Ó Fearghaíl (FF)	Martin Heydon (FG)	3 seats 1997–2020
32nd	2016	Fiona O'Loughlin (FF)	Seán Ó Fearghaíl (FF)	Martin Heydon (FG)	3 seats 1997–2020
33rd	2020	Cathal Berry (Ind.)	Seán Ó Fearghaíl (FF)	Martin Heydon (FG)	Patricia Ryan (SF)
34th	2024	Mark Wall (Lab)	Seán Ó Fearghaíl (FF)	Martin Heydon (FG)	Shónagh Ní Raghallaigh (SF)
