= Mark Wall (politician) =

Irish politician (born 1970)

Mark Wall TD
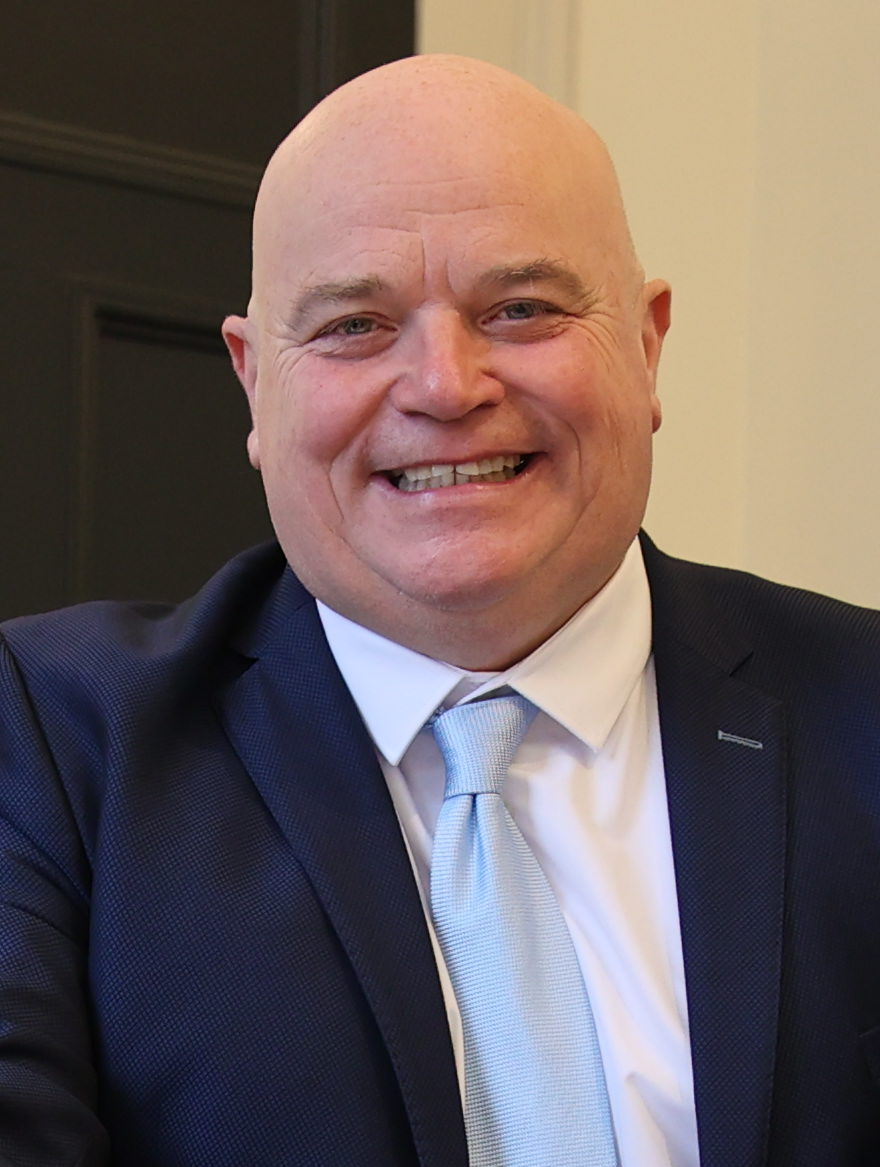
- Wall in 2024

Teachta Dála
- Incumbent
- Assumed office November 2024
- Constituency: Kildare South

Senator
- In office 29 June 2020 – 30 November 2024
- Constituency: Industrial and Commercial Panel

Personal details
- Born: 13 January 1970 (age 56) Portlaoise, County Laois, Ireland
- Party: Labour Party
- Parent: Jack Wall (father)
- Education: Institute of Technology, Carlow

Mark Wall (born 13 January 1970) is an Irish Labour Party politician who has been a Teachta Dála (TD) for the Kildare South constituency since the 2024 general election. He previously served as a Senator on the Industrial and Commercial Panel from 2020 to 2024.

== Biography ==
Wall attended Churchtown national school and Scoil Eoin in Athy, and later received a Diploma in Marketing and Business Studies from the Institute of Technology, Carlow.

His father, Jack Wall was a senator from 1993 to 1997, and a TD from 1997 to 2016.

== Political career ==
He was first elected to Kildare County Council at the 2009 Kildare County Council election and additionally to Athy Town Council at the same time. Wall served as Deputy Mayor of Athy in 2012, Mayor of Athy in 2012–2013, Mayor of Kildare in 2013–2014 and was elected Chair of Athy Municipal District in 2015. Wall has served as a board member of Scoil Lorcain Castledermot, Kildare Centre for the Unemployed, Churchtown Castlemitchell Community Development Association, Athy Heritage Company and The Willow Project.

He was an unsuccessful candidate for Kildare South at the 2016 and 2020 general elections, but was elected to the Seanad in 2020.

During his time in the Seanad, Wall has spoken about the issue of gambling addiction and repeatedly raised the issue. In 2021, Wall introduced a bill to ban gambling advertisements, stating that adequate supports should be "in place to help those suffering from (gambling) addiction". A survey conducted by Wall in 2021 found that three in every four Irish people knew someone with a gambling addiction, with Wall stating this was "hugely concerning".

In the 2024 general election, Wall was elected on the 12th count to represent Kildare South.

Dáil	Election	Deputy (Party)	Deputy (Party)	Deputy (Party)	Deputy (Party)
28th	1997	Jack Wall (Lab)	Alan Dukes (FG)	Seán Power (FF)	3 seats 1997–2020
29th	2002	Jack Wall (Lab)	Seán Ó Fearghaíl (FF)	Seán Power (FF)	3 seats 1997–2020
30th	2007	Jack Wall (Lab)	Seán Ó Fearghaíl (FF)	Seán Power (FF)	3 seats 1997–2020
31st	2011	Jack Wall (Lab)	Seán Ó Fearghaíl (FF)	Martin Heydon (FG)	3 seats 1997–2020
32nd	2016	Fiona O'Loughlin (FF)	Seán Ó Fearghaíl (FF)	Martin Heydon (FG)	3 seats 1997–2020
33rd	2020	Cathal Berry (Ind.)	Seán Ó Fearghaíl (FF)	Martin Heydon (FG)	Patricia Ryan (SF)
34th	2024	Mark Wall (Lab)	Seán Ó Fearghaíl (FF)	Martin Heydon (FG)	Shónagh Ní Raghallaigh (SF)
