= Kildare South (Dáil constituency) =

Dáil constituency (1997–present)

- Dáil constituency
- Location of Kildare South within Ireland
- Interactive map of constituency boundaries since the 2024 general election
- Major settlements: Athy; Castledermot; Kildare; Monasterevin; Newbridge

Current constituency
- Created: 1997
- Seats: 3 (1997–2020); 4 (2020–)
- TDs: Martin Heydon (FG); Shónagh Ní Raghallaigh (SF); Seán Ó Fearghaíl (FF); Mark Wall (Lab)
- Local government area: County Kildare
- Created from: Kildare
- EP constituency: Midlands–North-West

Kildare South is a parliamentary constituency represented in Dáil Éireann, the lower house of the Irish parliament or Oireachtas. The constituency elects four deputies (Teachtaí Dála, commonly known as TDs) on the electoral system of proportional representation by means of the single transferable vote (PR-STV).

== History and boundaries ==
The constituency was first used at the 1997 general election, when the former 5-seat Kildare constituency was divided into Kildare South and Kildare North.

The Kildare South constituency spans the more rural southern and western areas of County Kildare, taking in the towns of Newbridge, Kildare, Athy, Caragh and many other areas. At the 2020 general election, it gained an extra seat to become a 4-seat constituency.

The Constituency Review Report 2023 of the Electoral Commission recommended that at the next general election, the boundary of Kildare South be altered with the transfer of territory to Kildare North, Laois and Offaly.

For the 2024 general election, the Electoral (Amendment) Act 2023 defines the constituency as:

"The county of Kildare, except the part thereof which is comprised in the constituency of Kildare North."

Changes to the Kildare South constituency 1997–present
Years	TDs	Boundaries	Notes
1997–2016	3	County Kildare, except the part in the constituency of Kildare North	Created from Kildare, with transfer from Wicklow of the electoral divisions of Ballitore, Belan, Carrigeen, Castledermot, Graney, Inchaquire, Moone, Narraghmore, in the former Rural District of Athy No. 1; Ballymore Eustace, Carnalway, Gilitown, Kilcullen, Kilashee, Newtown, Usk, in the former Rural District of Naas No. 1.
2002–2007	3	County Kildare, except the part in the constituency of Kildare North	Transfer from Kildare North of Ballynadrumny, Cadamstown, Carbury, Carrick, Drehid, Dunfierth, Kilrainy, Windmill Cross, in the former Rural District of Edenderry No. 2.
2007–2011	3	County Kildare, except the part in the constituency of Kildare North	Transfer to Kildare North of Ballynadrumny, Cadamstown, Carbury, Carrick, Drehid, Dunfierth, Kilrainy, Windmill Cross, in the former Rural District of Edenderry No. 2, and Downings, Robertstown, and Timahoe South, in the former Rural District of Naas No. 1.
2011–2016	3	County Kildare, except the part in the constituency of Kildare North	Transfer to Kildare North of Kilpatrick, in the former Rural District of Edenderry No. 2, and Newtown, in the former Rural District of Naas No. 1.
2016–2020	3	County Kildare, except the parts in the constituencies of Kildare North and Laois	Transfer from Kildare North of Kilpatrick and Windmill Cross, in the former Rural District of Edenderry No. 2, and Robertstown and Timahoe South, in the former Rural District of Naas No. 1, Transfer to new constituency of Laois of Ballybrackan, Churchtown, Harristown, Kilberry, Kildangan and Monasterevin, in the former Rural District of Athy No. 1.
2020–	4	County Kildare, except the parts in the constituencies of Kildare North, and in County Laois, the electoral divisions of Ballybrittas, Jamestown, Kilmullen, Portarlington South, in the former Rural District of Mountmellick; and in County Offaly, the electoral division of Portarlington North, in the former Rural District of Tullamore.	Transfer from Kildare North of the electoral division of Carbury, Carrick, Drehid, Kilrainy in the former Edenderry No. 2 Rural District, transfer from the former constituency of Laois of Ballybrackan, Churchtown, Harristown, Kilberry, Kildangan and Monasterevin, in the former Rural District of Athy No. 1, in County Kildare, and of Ballybrittas, Jamestown, Kilmullen, Portarlington South, in the former Rural District of Mountmellick, in County Laois transfer from the former constituency of Offaly of Portarlington North, in the former Rural District of Tullamore.

== TDs ==
Teachtaí Dála (TDs) for Kildare South 1997–
Key to parties: FF = Fianna Fáil; FG = Fine Gael; Ind. = Independent; Lab = Labour; SF = Sinn Féin
Dáil	Election	Deputy (Party)	Deputy (Party)	Deputy (Party)	Deputy (Party)
28th	1997	Jack Wall (Lab)	Alan Dukes (FG)	Seán Power (FF)	3 seats 1997–2020
29th	2002	Jack Wall (Lab)	Seán Ó Fearghaíl (Note: Ó Fearghaíl has served as Ceann Comhairle in the 32nd and 33rd Dáil. He was returned automatically at the 2020 and 2024 general elections.) (FF)	Seán Power (FF)	3 seats 1997–2020
30th	2007	Jack Wall (Lab)	Seán Ó Fearghaíl (FF)	Seán Power (FF)	3 seats 1997–2020
31st	2011	Jack Wall (Lab)	Seán Ó Fearghaíl (FF)	Martin Heydon (FG)	3 seats 1997–2020
32nd	2016	Fiona O'Loughlin (FF)	Seán Ó Fearghaíl (FF)	Martin Heydon (FG)	3 seats 1997–2020
33rd	2020	Cathal Berry (Ind.)	Seán Ó Fearghaíl (FF)	Martin Heydon (FG)	Patricia Ryan (SF)
34th	2024	Mark Wall (Lab)	Seán Ó Fearghaíl (FF)	Martin Heydon (FG)	Shónagh Ní Raghallaigh (SF)

Note: The columns in this table are used only for presentational purposes, and no significance should be attached to the order of columns. For details of the order in which seats were won at each election, see the detailed results of that election.

== Elections ==
*: Outgoing TD

=== 2024 general election ===
Seán Ó Fearghaíl was Ceann Comhairle at the dissolution of the 33rd Dáil and was returned automatically. The constituency was treated as a three-seater for the purposes of calculating the quota.

2024 general election: Kildare South
Party	Candidate	FPv%	Count											
Party	Candidate	FPv%	1	2	3	4	5	6	7	8	9	10	11	12
Fianna Fáil	Seán Ó Fearghaíl	N/A	Returned automatically											
Fine Gael	Martin Heydon	21.6	9,262	9,278	9,290	9,303	9,407	9,477	9,595	9,628	9,828	10,217	11,364	
Fianna Fáil	Fiona O'Loughlin	17.4	7,489	7,503	7,511	7,528	7,608	7,651	7,697	7,729	7,904	8,312	9,124	9,482
Sinn Féin	Shónagh Ní Raghallaigh	16.9	7,241	7,264	7,407	7,455	7,491	7,626	7,763	7,912	8,379	9,426	10,151	10,220
Labour	Mark Wall	15.5	6,654	6,662	6,703	6,722	6,859	7,040	7,251	7,350	7,505	8,744	9,739	9,942
Social Democrats	Chris Pender	7.3	3,157	3,166	3,372	3,390	3,543	3,617	3,670	3,722	3,888			
Independent	Cathal Berry	7.0	3,007	3,055	3,076	3,162	3,216	3,317	3,441	3,663	4,290	4,767		
Aontú	Melissa Byrne	3.9	1,677	1,692	1,713	1,767	1,784	1,825	1,939	2,380				
Irish Freedom	Anthony Casey	2.2	957	973	981	1,129	1,134	1,165	1,362					
Independent Ireland	William Carton	2.2	955	1,004	1,012	1,065	1,071	1,113						
Independent	Patricia Ryan	1.6	678	703	711	753	762							
Green	Monaa K. Sood	1.4	585	592	613	618								
Independent	Tom McDonnell	1.2	499	530	534									
PBP–Solidarity	Rob Cosgrave (Note: Cosgrave is a member of Solidarity.)	1.2	498	505										
Independent	Leanne O'Neill	0.3	152											
Independent Ireland	Edel Doran	0.3	123											
Electorate: 74,423 Valid: 42,934 Spoilt: 271 Quota: 10,734 Turnout: 43,205 (58.0%)

=== 2020 general election ===
Seán Ó Fearghaíl was Ceann Comhairle at the dissolution of the 32nd Dáil and therefore deemed to be returned automatically. The constituency was treated as a three-seater for the purposes of calculating the quota.

2020 general election: Kildare South
Party	Candidate	FPv%	Count							
Party	Candidate	FPv%	1	2	3	4	5	6	7	8
Fianna Fáil	Seán Ó Fearghaíl	N/A	Returned automatically							
Sinn Féin	Patricia Ryan	21.5	10,155	10,461	10,719	11,072	11,295	12,152		
Fine Gael	Martin Heydon	17.1	8,069	8,120	8,218	8,567	9,010	9,651	11,676	11,710
Fianna Fáil	Fiona O'Loughlin	12.6	5,927	5,985	6,043	6,176	8,177	8,936	10,370	10,425
Labour	Mark Wall	12.5	5,899	5,974	6,142	6,648	6,984	7,484		
Independent	Cathal Berry	12.2	5,742	5,961	6,176	6,501	6,876	8,270	10,693	10,940
Independent	Fiona McLoughlin Healy	7.7	3,616	3,730	3,938	4,221	4,471			
Fianna Fáil	Suzanne Doyle	7.6	3,580	3,665	3,703	3,782				
Green	Ronan Maher	3.5	1,639	1,754	2,144					
Social Democrats	Linda Hayden	2.8	1,338	1,474						
Aontú	Anita Mhic Gib	1.5	697							
Solidarity–PBP	Róisín Uí Bhroin (Note: Uí Bhroin was a member of People Before Profit.)	1.3	598							
Electorate: 77,719 Valid: 47,260 Spoilt: 440 (0.9%) Quota: 11,815 Turnout: 47,700 (61.4%)

=== 2016 general election ===
2016 general election: Kildare South
Party	Candidate	FPv%	Count					
Party	Candidate	FPv%	1	2	3	4	5	6
Fine Gael	Martin Heydon	21.3	7,851	8,048	8,297	10,321		
Fianna Fáil	Fiona O'Loughlin	18.8	6,906	7,073	7,373	7,905	8,149	8,974
Fianna Fáil	Seán Ó Fearghaíl	17.6	6,469	6,583	6,891	7,166	7,343	8,220
Labour	Mark Wall	11.6	4,277	4,504	4,764	5,154	5,806	6,864
Sinn Féin	Patricia Ryan	11.6	4,267	4,459	5,294	5,434	5,485	
Fine Gael	Fiona McLoughlin Healy	8.8	3,250	3,416	3,554			
Independent	Declan Crowe	5.8	2,143	2,609				
Green	Suzanne McEneaney	2.3	836					
Renua	Mary Kennedy	2.1	787					
Electorate: 59,162 Valid: 36,786 Spoilt: 386 Quota: 9,197 Turnout: 37,172 (62.8%)

=== 2011 general election ===
2011 general election: Kildare South
Party	Candidate	FPv%	Count						
Party	Candidate	FPv%	1	2	3	4	5	6	7
Fine Gael	Martin Heydon	33.3	12,755						
Labour	Jack Wall	27.8	10,645						
Fianna Fáil	Seán Ó Fearghaíl	11.8	4,514	4,961	5,097	5,177	5,315	5,552	8,707
Fianna Fáil	Seán Power	9.9	3,793	4,307	4,445	4,542	4,650	4,888	
Independent	Paddy Kennedy	7.3	2,806	3,825	4,081	4,387	5,156	6,841	7,710
Sinn Féin	Jason Turner	6.0	2,308	2,610	2,882	2,905	3,253		
Independent	Clifford T. Reid	2.4	926	1,410	1,644	1,873			
Green	Vivian Cummins	1.4	523	944	1,045				
Electorate: 58,867 Valid: 38,270 Spoilt: 353 (0.9%) Quota: 9,568 Turnout: 38,623 (65.6%)

=== 2007 general election ===
2007 general election: Kildare South
Party	Candidate	FPv%	Count		
Party	Candidate	FPv%	1	2	3
Fianna Fáil	Seán Ó Fearghaíl	25.2	8,731		
Fianna Fáil	Seán Power	25.1	8,694		
Labour	Jack Wall	20.7	7,154	7,712	9,145
Fine Gael	Richard Daly	9.7	3,353	3,654	4,039
Fine Gael	Alan Gillis	7.5	2,586	2,861	3,178
Green	J. J. Power	6.2	2,136	2,658	
Progressive Democrats	Jane Mullins	4.4	1,513		
Independent	Tom Doyle	1.2	424		
Electorate: 56,670 Valid: 34,591 Spoilt: 347 (1.0%) Quota: 8,648 Turnout: 34,938 (61.7%)

=== 2002 general election ===
2002 general election: Kildare South
Party	Candidate	FPv%	Count					
Party	Candidate	FPv%	1	2	3	4	5	6
Fianna Fáil	Seán Power	23.9	7,782	7,817	7,860	9,169		
Fianna Fáil	Seán Ó Fearghaíl	22.6	7,370	7,458	7,501	8,426		
Labour	Jack Wall	18.5	6,043	6,148	6,264	7,443	7,849	7,977
Fine Gael	Alan Dukes	15.2	4,967	5,040	5,546	7,170	7,650	7,790
Progressive Democrats	John Dardis	11.9	3,887	3,946	4,058			
Green	J. J. Power	3.7	1,208	1,335	1,351			
Fine Gael	Rainsford Hendy	2.5	828	850				
Independent	Ger Fitzgibbon	1.7	546					
Electorate: 58,354 Valid: 32,631 Spoilt: 501 (1.5%) Quota: 8,158 Turnout: 33,132 (56.8%)

=== 1997 general election ===
1997 general election: Kildare South
Party	Candidate	FPv%	Count				
Party	Candidate	FPv%	1	2	3	4	5
Fine Gael	Alan Dukes	21.7	6,260	6,426	7,419		
Labour	Jack Wall	20.3	5,834	6,077	6,251	6,870	7,039
Fianna Fáil	Sean Power	19.7	5,665	6,048	6,124	8,066	
Fianna Fáil	Seán Ó Fearghaíl	15.6	4,503	4,750	4,795	5,907	6,601
Progressive Democrats	John Dardis	13.5	3,895	4,038	4,114		
Fine Gael	Rainsford F. Hendy	4.8	1,371	1,399			
Fianna Fáil	Christy Walsh	2.3	662				
Independent	Francis J. Browne	2.1	618				
Electorate: 47,030 Valid: 28,808 Spoilt: 365 (1.3%) Quota: 7,203 Turnout: 29,173 (60.9%)

== See also ==
- Elections in the Republic of Ireland
- Politics of the Republic of Ireland
- List of Dáil by-elections
- List of political parties in the Republic of Ireland
