= Katie Hannon =

Irish journalist and TV presenter

- Born: August 1971 (age 54–55); Duagh, County Kerry, Ireland
- Education: Dublin Institute of Technology
- Occupations: Journalist; presenter
- Employer: Raidió Teilifís Éireann (RTÉ)

Katie Hannon (born August 1971) is an Irish journalist, radio and television presenter employed by RTÉ. She hosted her own self-titled weekly current affairs television programme, Upfront with Katie Hannon from January 2023-late June 2025. She previously presented RTÉ Radio 1's political radio programmes, The Late Debate and Saturday with Katie Hannon. Hannon currently co- hosts Drivetime alongside Colm O’ Mongain on weekdays on RTÉ Radio 1 from 4:00PM–6:00PM since November 2025.

== Career ==
Hannon was educated in both Duagh National School and Presentation Secondary School Listowel, County Kerry and she studied journalism in the Dublin Institute of Technology in Rathmines and Aungier Street.

Hannon was previously political correspondent for Evening Herald from 1992 to 1999 and also for the Irish Examiner from 1999 to 2001. She was political editor of Ireland on Sunday from 2002 to 2004.

Hannon joined RTÉ in 2004. She appeared on a 2004 episode of The Panel.

During the late 2000s and early 2010s she presented Prime Time at phases.

From 2018 to 2022, she presented RTÉ Radio 1's political radio programmes, The Late Debate and Saturday with Katie Hannon, and was a relief presenter of Liveline. from 2018- late 2025

In November 2022, RTÉ announced that Hannon would take over from Claire Byrne on Monday nights as presenter of Upfront with Katie Hannon, a new current affairs programme, beginning 9 January 2023. On 26 May 2025 the programme was axed.

On 23 October 2021, in a special Saturday with Katie Hannon entitled Women of Honour, Hannon investigated the treatment of sexual assault allegations in the Irish Defense Forces. The survivors formed a representative group of the same name. An official investigation was ordered by the Minister for Defence, Simon Coveney in January 2022. The final report, published in March 2023 made 13 recommendations which the Government accepted in full.

On 3 week Sunday night series in Autumn 2023 presenter of called The Records Show a 2nd series was broadcast in Autumn 2025. On October 8, 2025, she hosted an interview on who is running for Ireland's new president.

In March 2026 Hannon was appointed adjunct professor of journalism at the University of Limerick.

== Bibliography ==
- The Naked Politician (2004)
