= 2024 Irish general election =

Election to the 34th Dáil

- 29 November 2024

174 seats in Dáil Éireann (Note: Including Seán Ó Fearghaíl (FF), returned automatically for Kildare South as outgoing Ceann Comhairle, under Art. 16.6 of the Constitution and the Electoral Act 1992.) (Note: The last election was for a Dáil with 160 seats.) 88 seats needed for a majority
- Opinion polls
- Registered: 3,715,285
- Turnout: 59.7% ▼3.0pp
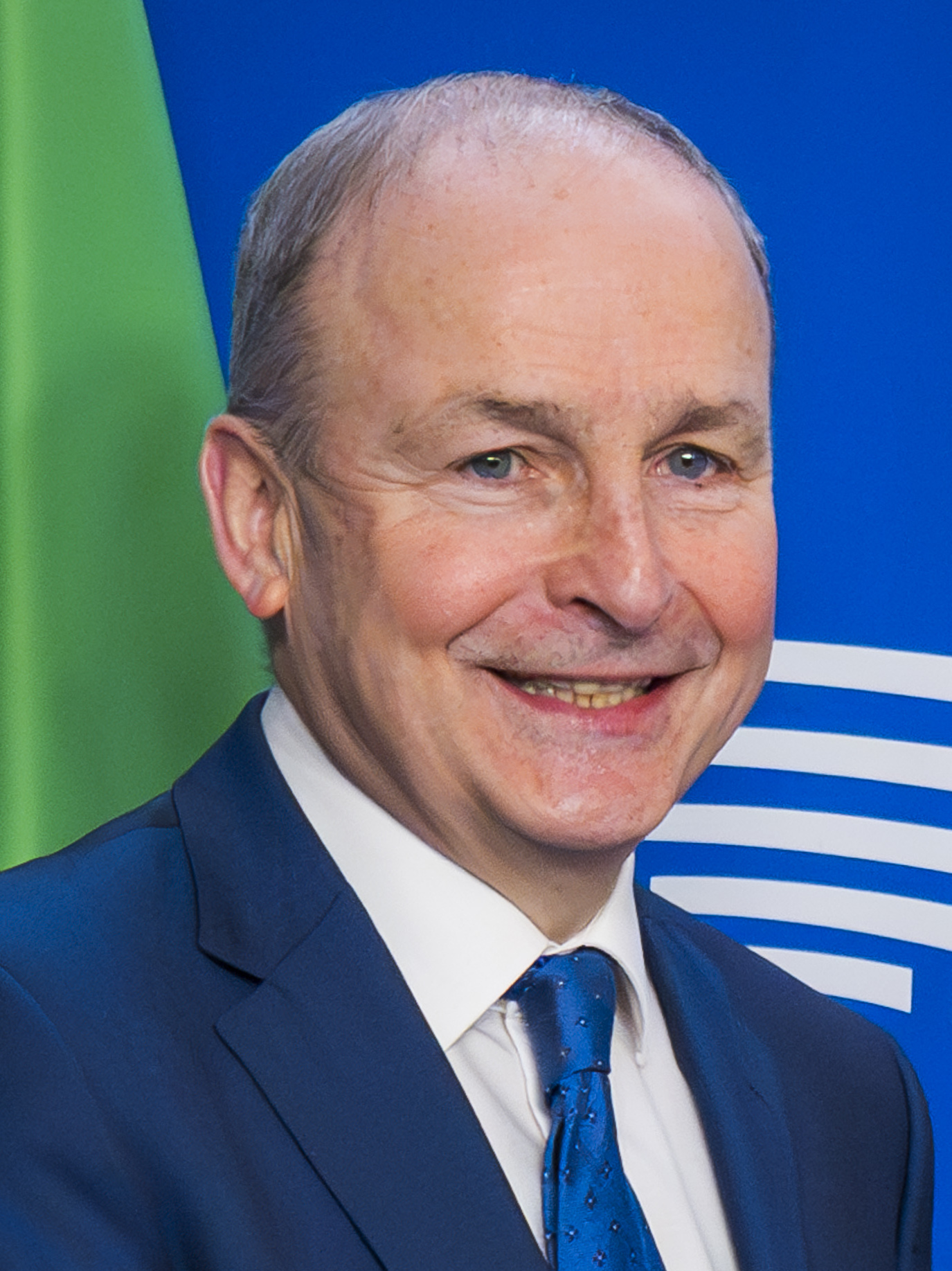

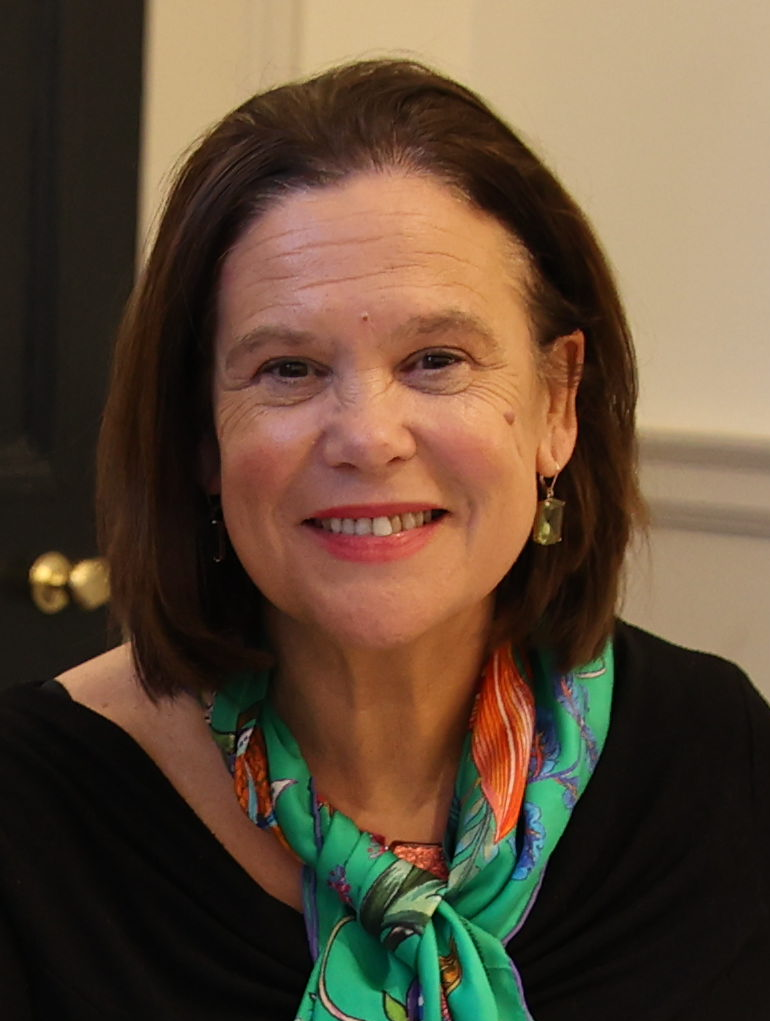

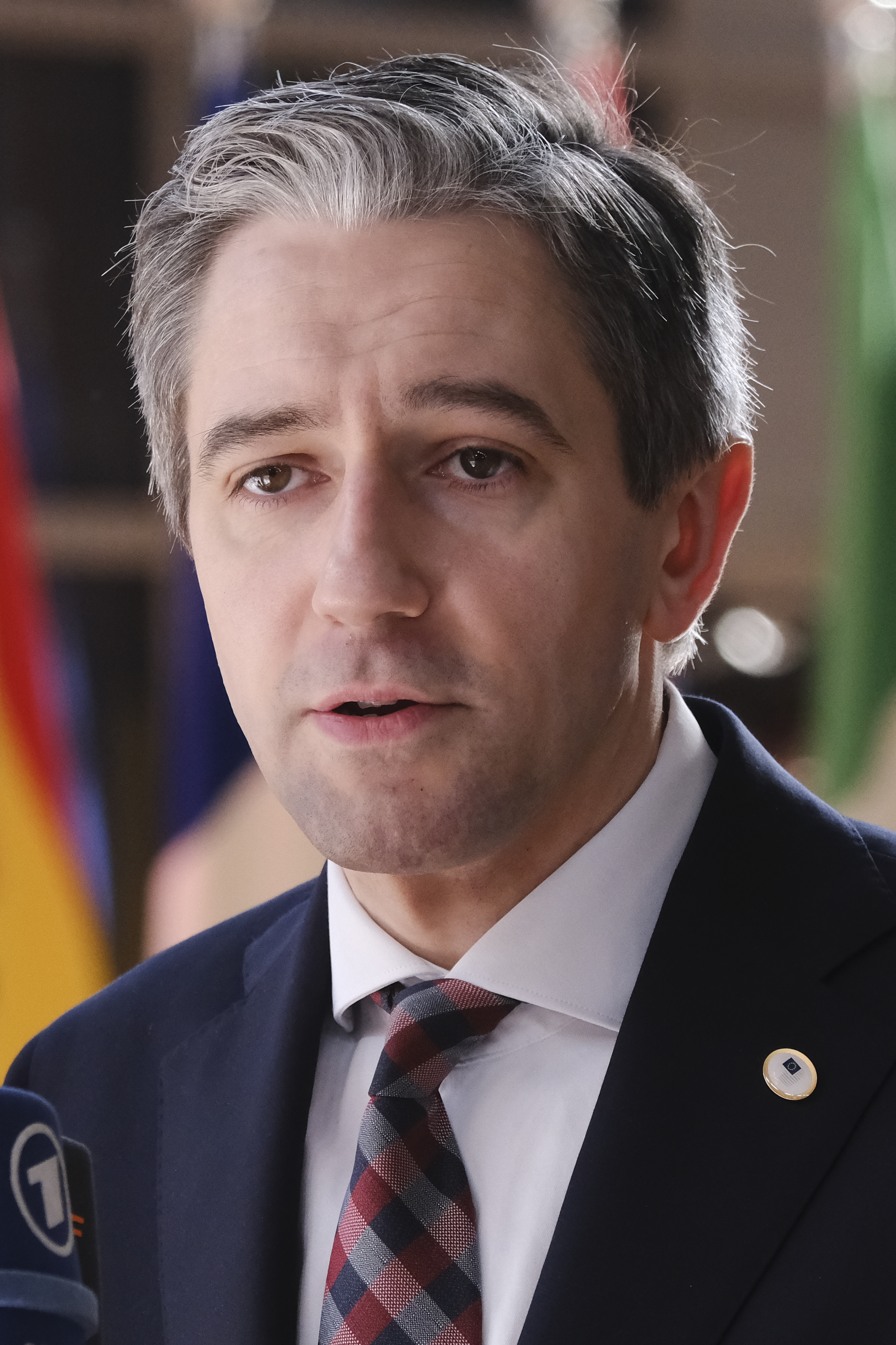

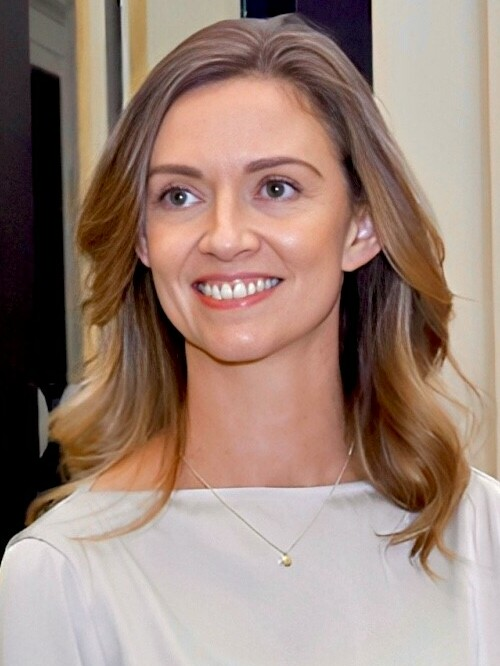

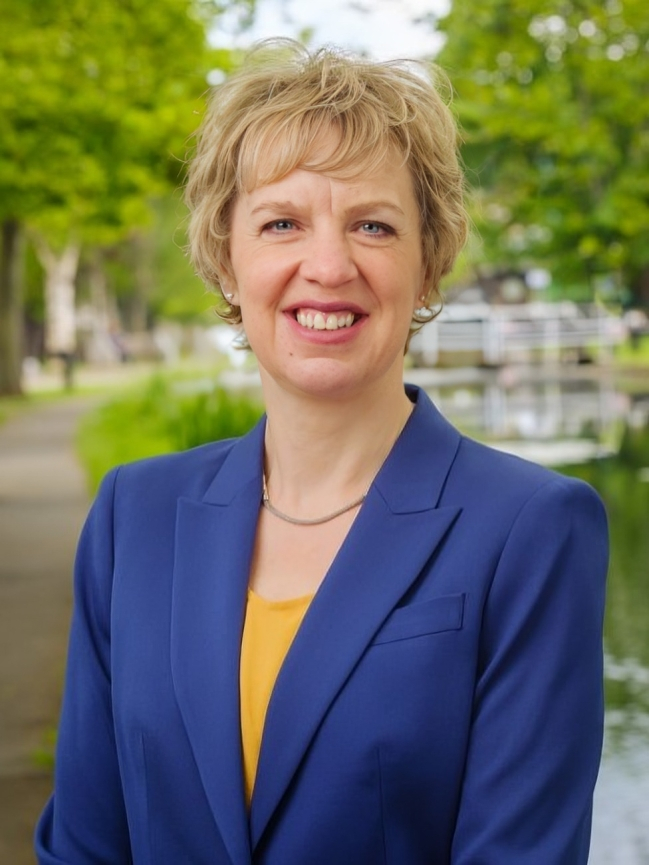

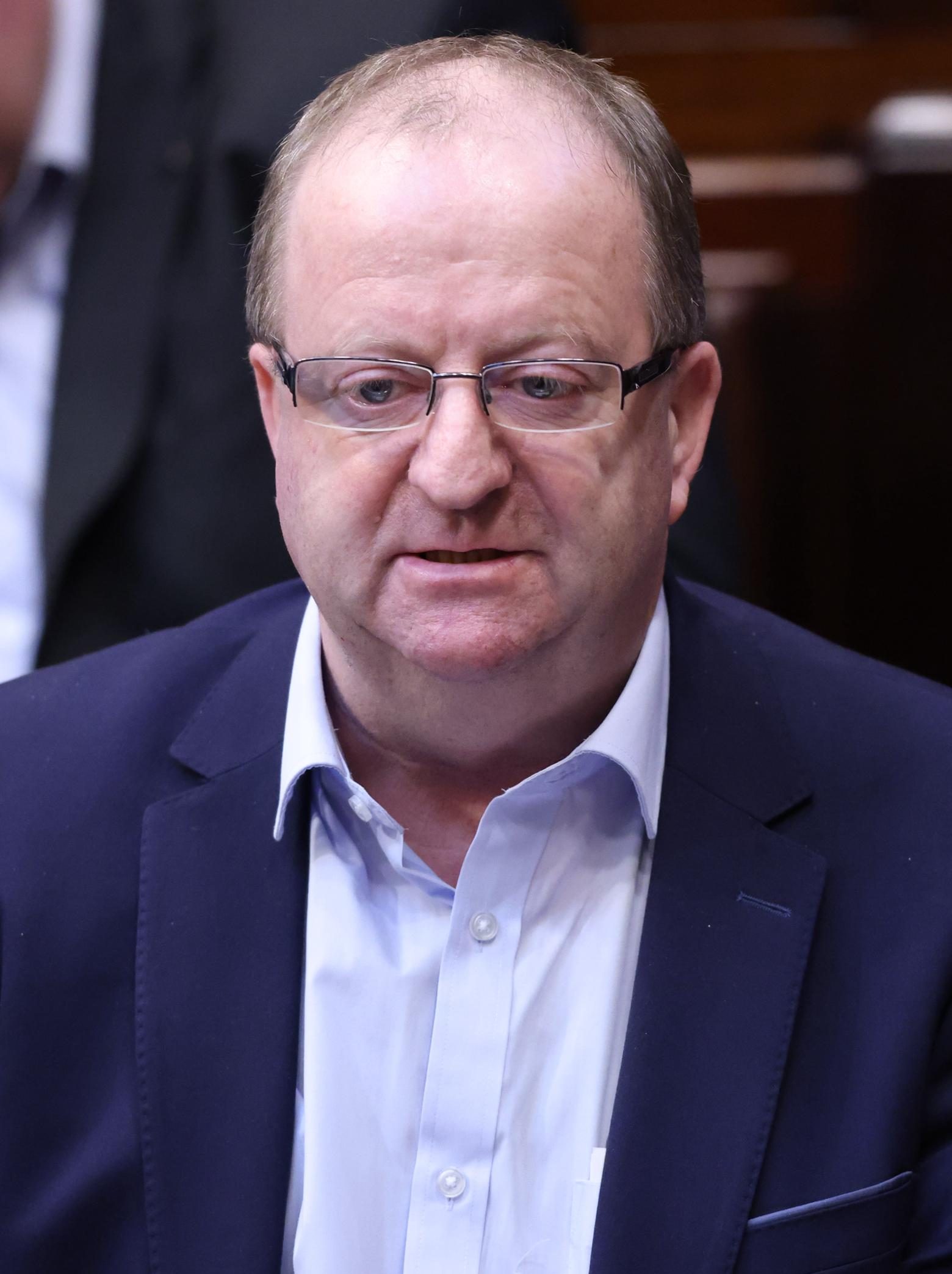

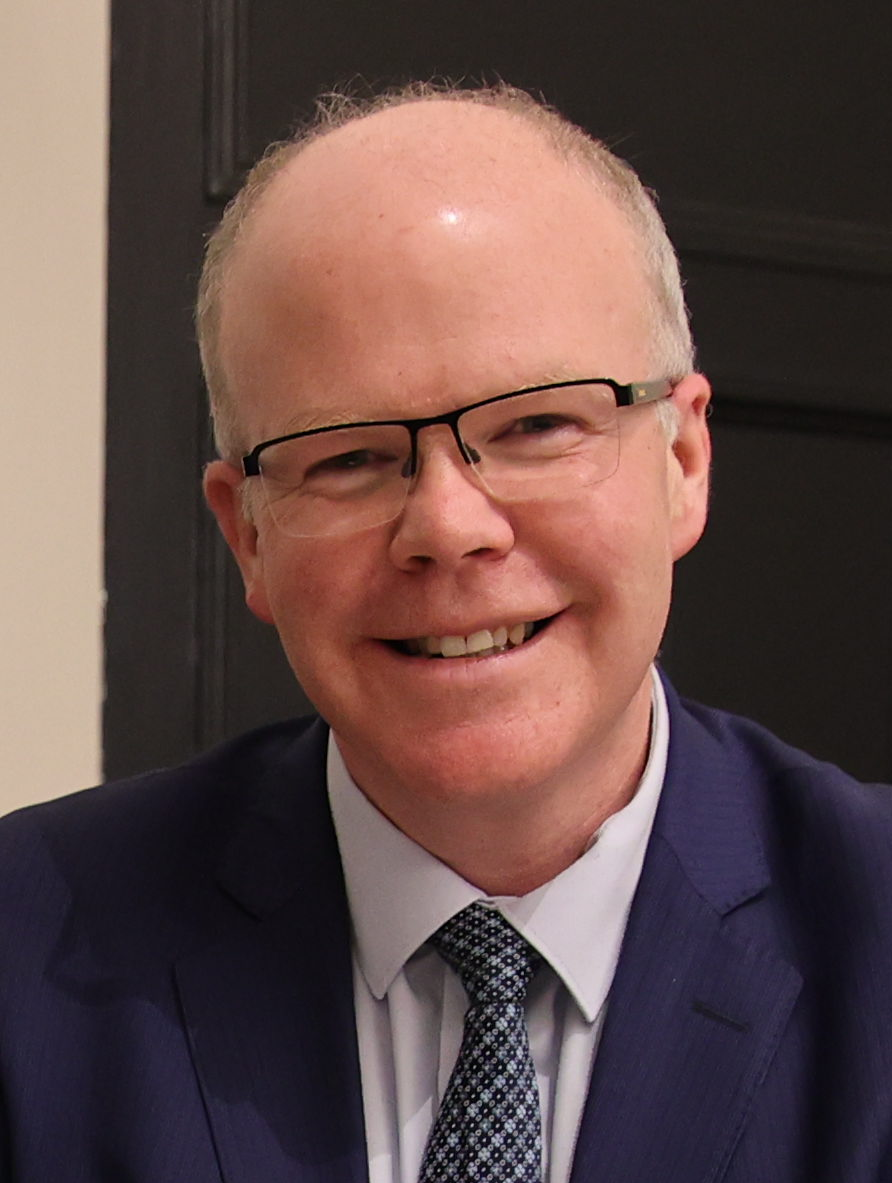

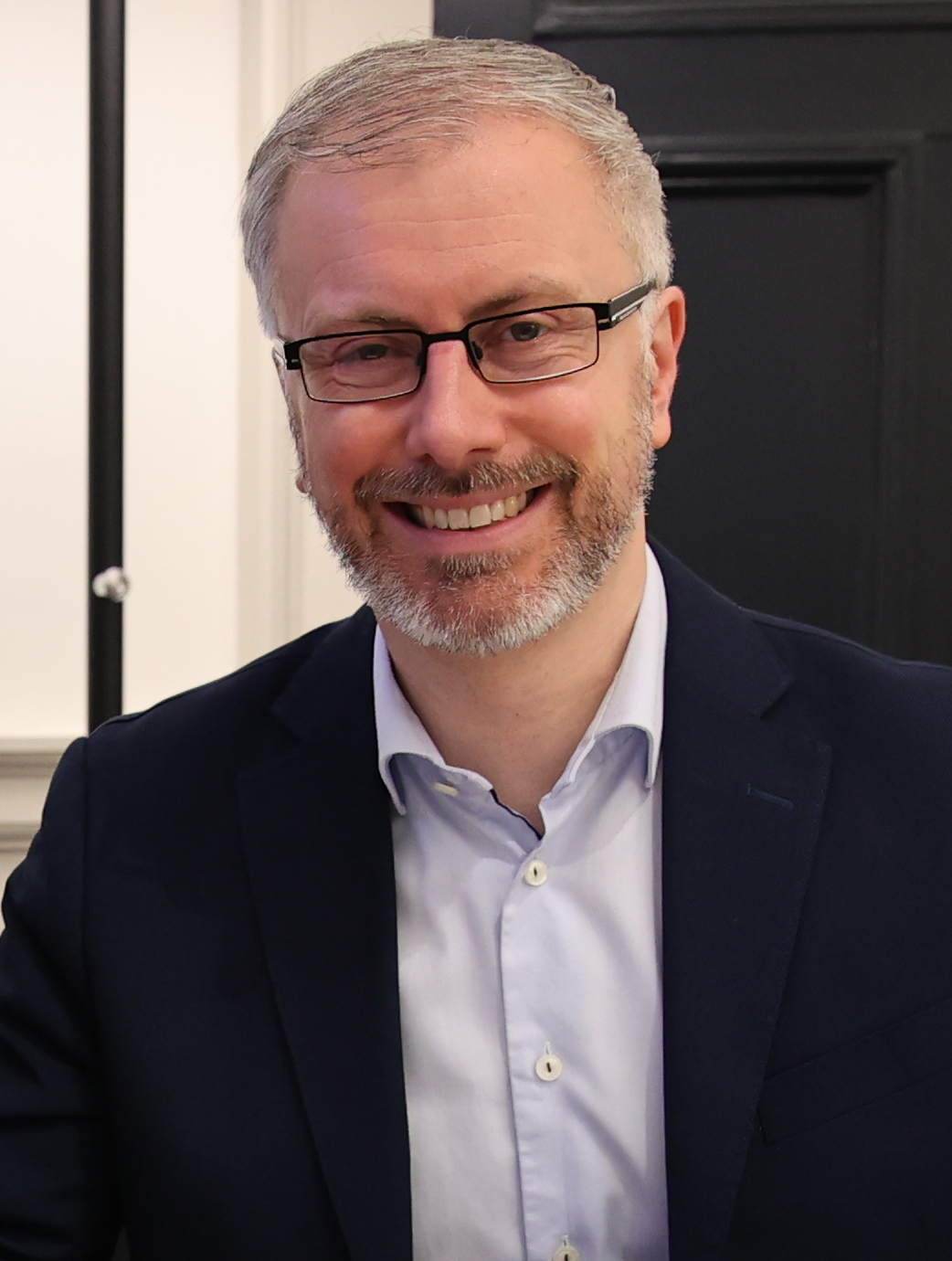
	First party	Second party	Third party
Leader	Micheál Martin	Mary Lou McDonald	Simon Harris
Party	Fianna Fáil	Sinn Féin	Fine Gael
Leader since	26 January 2011	10 February 2018	24 March 2024
Leader's seat	Cork South-Central	Dublin Central	Wicklow
Last election	38 seats, 22.2%	37 seats, 24.5%	35 seats, 20.9%
Seats won	48	39	38
Seat change	▲10	▲2	▲3
Popular vote	481,414	418,627	458,134
Percentage	21.9%	19.0%	20.8%
Swing	▼0.3 pp	▼5.5 pp	▼0.1 pp
	Fourth party	Fifth party	Sixth party
Leader	Holly Cairns	Ivana Bacik	Michael Collins
Party	Social Democrats	Labour	Independent Ireland
Leader since	26 February 2023	24 March 2022	10 November 2023
Leader's seat	Cork South-West	Dublin Bay South	Cork South-West
Last election	6 seats, 2.9%	6 seats, 4.4%	New party
Seats won	11	11	4
Seat change	▲5	▲5	New party
Popular vote	106,028	102,457	78,276
Percentage	4.8%	4.7%	3.6%
Swing	▲1.9 pp	▲0.3 pp	New party
	Seventh party	Eighth party	Ninth party
	PBP–S
Leader	Collective leadership	Peadar Tóibín	Roderic O'Gorman
Party	PBP–Solidarity	Aontú	Green
Leader since	N/A	28 January 2019	8 July 2024
Leader's seat	N/A	Meath West	Dublin West
Last election	5 seats, 2.6%	1 seat, 1.9%	12 seats, 7.1%
Seats won	3	2	1
Seat change	▼2	▲1	▼11
Popular vote	62,481	86,134	66,911
Percentage	2.8%	3.9%	3.0%
Swing	▲0.2 pp	▲2.0 pp	▼4.1 pp
Taoiseach before election
Simon Harris
Fine Gael
Taoiseach after election
Micheál Martin
Fianna Fáil

Dáil constituencies for the 2024 general election

The 2024 Irish general election to elect the 34th Dáil took place on Friday, 29 November 2024, following the dissolution of the 33rd Dáil on 8 November by President Michael D. Higgins at the request of Taoiseach Simon Harris. Polls were open from 7 a.m. to 10 p.m UTC. It elected 174 Teachtaí Dála (TDs) across 43 constituencies of between 3 and 5 seats to Dáil Éireann, the lower house of the Oireachtas, Ireland's legislature. Under the Electoral (Amendment) Act 2023, the number of TDs was increased from 160 to 174, making it the largest Dáil in the history of the state, with an increase in the number of constituencies from 39 to 43. The main issues in the campaign were the cost of living, housing affordability and availability, immigration and asylum management, and economic stability amid external trade uncertainties, reflecting voter concerns despite the country's strong overall financial health.

The election resulted in Fianna Fáil remaining as the largest party, increasing its number of seats to 48. Its governing partner Fine Gael won 38 seats, with the two parties combined winning 86 seats, two shy of a majority. The Green Party, the third party of government, lost all but one of its seats, with only leader Roderic O'Gorman returning to the Dáil. Sinn Féin remained as the second largest party, winning 39 seats, while the Social Democrats and Labour each won 11 seats, an increase of five each.

On 15 January 2025, the formation of a coalition government was agreed between Fianna Fáil, Fine Gael, and nine independents. Micheál Martin was appointed Taoiseach on 23 January 2025.

== Background ==
The 33rd Dáil first met on 20 February 2020, and could have been dissolved no later than 19 February 2025. This meant that, per a calculation in The Irish Times, the latest date the election could have been held was 22 March 2025.

In June 2020, Fianna Fáil, Fine Gael and the Green Party formed a coalition government. The parties agreed on a rotation, with the two major party leaders alternating as Taoiseach. Micheál Martin, leader of Fianna Fáil, served as Taoiseach from 27 June 2020 to 17 December 2022; Leo Varadkar, leader of Fine Gael, served as Taoiseach from 17 December 2022 to 9 April 2024; and Simon Harris served as Taoiseach from 9 April 2024, shortly after succeeding Varadkar as Fine Gael leader.

For most of 2024, many pundits believed that an autumn election was likely; coalition leaders repeatedly said they would like the government to complete its full term but were open to an early election if the circumstances provided for it. Polling conducted in October 2024 indicated a majority of the public supported an early election to be held in November of the same year.

Following the announcement on 1 October 2024 of the 2025 budget, speculation began in earnest that an election would be called for November or December. In late October, Harris said that he expected the election to be held before the end of 2024. On 6 November, Harris confirmed that he would seek a dissolution of the Dáil on 8 November. Two days later, he asked the president to dissolve the Dáil. Later that day, Darragh O'Brien, the Minister for Housing, Local Government and Heritage, signed the order for the election to take place on 29 November 2024 and a three-week election campaign began.

To stand for election to Dáil Éireann, candidates must be Irish citizens aged at least 21, and if unaffiliated with a registered political party, they must secure either 30 assentors from the constituency or lodge a €500 deposit.

== Constituency revision ==
In August 2023, the Electoral Commission proposed a Dáil size of 174 TDs to be elected in 43 Dáil constituencies – an increase of 14 TDs and four constituencies. This was the first review of constituencies carried out by the Commission established under the Electoral Reform Act 2022, where previously they had been carried out by a Constituency Commission. This would be the largest size of the Dáil in the history of the State, surpassing the previous number of 166 TDs from 1981 to 2016. The Electoral (Amendment) Act 2023 implemented the recommendations of the commission.

The preliminary results of the 2022 census showed a population of over 5.1 million, which required a minimum Dáil size of 171 TDs. The commission was required by law to recommend a size of the Dáil of between 171 and 181 TDs. This range reflects the growth in the population of the state, and the requirement of Article 16.6.2° of the Constitution of Ireland that there be one TD elected for no less than every 20,000 of the population and no more than every 30,000.

== Electoral system ==
Under the system of single transferable vote (STV), each voter may mark any number of the candidates in order of preference. The quota is determined at the first count in each constituency by dividing the number of valid ballots by one more than the number of seats (for example, a quarter of the valid ballots in a three-seat constituency, a fifth of those in a four-seat constituency, and a sixth of those in a five-seat constituency) and then adding one vote. Any candidate reaching or exceeding the quota is elected.

If in the first count fewer candidates reach the quota than the number of seats to be filled, if any successful candidates have more votes than the quota, their surplus is distributed to remaining candidates based on the next usable marked preference on the ballot papers. If still it happens that fewer candidates have reached the quota than the number of seats to be filled, the last-placed candidate is excluded from the count and those ballot papers are transferred to the next usable marked preference. This is repeated until sufficient candidates have reached the quota to fill the available seats, or where a seat remains to be filled in a constituency and no candidate is capable of achieving a quota as there is nobody left to eliminate for a distribution, then the highest place candidate, even if not having quota, is deemed elected.

Seán Ó Fearghaíl, as Ceann Comhairle immediately before the dissolution of the 33rd Dáil, was automatically deemed to be elected a member of the 34th Dáil Éireann. This is provided for under the Constitution and electoral law.

== Vacancies ==
Four TDs were elected to the European Parliament and took office on 16 July, vacating their seats in the Dáil. One TD, Joe Carey, resigned from the Dáil on grounds of ill health.

TD	Constituency	Party	Date	Reason
Barry Cowen	Laois–Offaly	Fianna Fáil	16 July 2024	Elected to the European Parliament
Kathleen Funchion	Carlow–Kilkenny	Sinn Féin	16 July 2024	Elected to the European Parliament
Michael McNamara	Clare	Independent	16 July 2024	Elected to the European Parliament
Aodhán Ó Ríordáin	Dublin Bay North	Labour	16 July 2024	Elected to the European Parliament
Joe Carey	Clare	Fine Gael	27 August 2024	Resignation due to illness

== Retiring incumbents ==
Thirty outgoing members of the 33rd Dáil did not seek re-election:

Departing TD	Constituency	Party	First elected	Date confirmed
Joe McHugh	Donegal	Fine Gael (Note: McHugh left the Fine Gael parliamentary party in July 2022.)	2007	4 May 2022
Brendan Griffin	Kerry	Fine Gael	2011	31 January 2023
Denis Naughten	Roscommon–Galway	Independent	1997	13 February 2023
John Paul Phelan	Carlow–Kilkenny	Fine Gael	2011	18 April 2023
Michael Creed	Cork North-West	Fine Gael	1989	24 April 2023
David Stanton	Cork East	Fine Gael	1997	23 May 2023
Bríd Smith	Dublin South-Central	PBP–Solidarity	2016	10 July 2023
Richard Bruton	Dublin Bay North	Fine Gael	1982	5 September 2023
Charles Flanagan	Laois–Offaly	Fine Gael	1987	25 September 2023
Brendan Howlin	Wexford	Labour	1987	6 October 2023
Seán Sherlock	Cork East	Labour	2007	9 October 2023
Marc MacSharry	Sligo–Leitrim	Independent (Note: MacSharry was elected as a Fianna Fáil TD but left the party in 2022.)	2016	18 October 2023
Fergus O'Dowd	Louth	Fine Gael	2002	27 November 2023
Imelda Munster	Louth	Sinn Féin	2016	1 December 2023
Seán Haughey	Dublin Bay North	Fianna Fáil	1987	6 February 2024
Paul Kehoe	Wexford	Fine Gael	2002	12 February 2024
Ciarán Cannon	Galway East	Fine Gael	2011	19 March 2024
Josepha Madigan	Dublin Rathdown	Fine Gael	2016	22 March 2024
Eamon Ryan	Dublin Bay South	Green	2002	18 June 2024
Michael McGrath	Cork South-Central	Fianna Fáil	2007	25 June 2024
Catherine Murphy	Kildare North	Social Democrats	2005	2 July 2024
Róisín Shortall	Dublin North-West	Social Democrats	1992	2 July 2024
Simon Coveney	Cork South-Central	Fine Gael	1998	10 July 2024
Leo Varadkar	Dublin West	Fine Gael	2007	16 July 2024
Éamon Ó Cuív	Galway West	Fianna Fáil	1992	24 July 2024
Michael Ring	Mayo	Fine Gael	1994	30 July 2024
Peter Fitzpatrick	Louth	Independent	2011	30 August 2024
Damien English	Meath West	Fine Gael	2002	18 September 2024
Heather Humphreys	Cavan–Monaghan	Fine Gael	2011	19 October 2024
Jackie Cahill	Tipperary	Fianna Fáil	2016	21 October 2024

== Candidates ==
The 2024 general election featured 686 candidates and 20 registered political parties. A record 248 candidates are women, which is 36% of the total and a 53% increase from 2020. This was driven by a new 40% gender quota for both men and women in political party nominations, though women remain significantly underrepresented in the Dáil and Cabinet.

Parties	Candidates	Constituencies
Fianna Fáil	82	43
Fine Gael	80	43
Sinn Féin	71	43
Aontú	43	43
Green	43	43
PBP–Solidarity	42 (Note: 33 candidates are from People Before Profit and 9 candidates are from Solidarity)	42
Labour	32	31
Independent Ireland	28	23
Social Democrats	26	25
The Irish People	21 (Note: Member party of National Alliance)	21
Irish Freedom	16	16
National Party	9	9
Liberty Republic	6	6
Centre Party	3	3
Independents 4 Change	3	3
Party for Animal Welfare	3	3
Rabharta	3	3
Ireland First	2	2
Right to Change	1	1
100% Redress	1	1
Independent	171 (Note: 2 candidates are members of National Alliance)	43

== Campaign ==
In the first week of the campaign, Ryanair CEO Michael O'Leary, speaking at an event to launch the campaign of Peter Burke, the Minister for Enterprise, Trade and Employment and an outgoing Fine Gael TD for Longford–Westmeath, criticised the number of former teachers in the Dáil and advocated for more private-sector professionals to address infrastructure challenges. O'Leary's remarks were widely condemned by teaching unions and representatives of other parties as disrespectful to teachers and public servants. O'Leary defended his comments as a call for professional diversity in politics, while some government leaders (such as former teacher Micheál Martin) distanced themselves from his views, emphasising the value of teachers' contributions to society.

Following the first week of canvassing, the BBC suggested the primary issues in the campaign were the housing crisis, strained healthcare services, the rising cost of living, concerns over public spending and immigration reform. The Guardian has suggested the main campaign issues are the cost of living, housing, healthcare funding, immigration, and the use of a €14 billion tax windfall following the resolution of Apple's EU tax dispute. It has suggested voters are concerned about rising living costs, high rents, and healthcare resources, while the topic of immigration has become polarising, with calls for tougher controls. The Apple windfall has sparked debates on whether it should fund housing, infrastructure, or social services.

In addition to the criticism Fine Gael received due to their selection of John McGahon as a candidate, the party were also challenged during the campaign on their handling of Patsy O'Brien, a Mayo candidate expelled from the party in 2020 for sending inappropriate messages to a party staff member. Fine Gael cited privacy concerns for not disclosing the reason at the time, while opposition parties accused Fine Gael of hypocrisy, noting Fine Gael's call for political accountability during the campaign. O'Brien, now running as an Independent, refused to comment on the allegations, citing legal advice. Further scrutiny emerged around Chief Whip Hildegarde Naughton, who canvassed with O'Brien in 2020 despite allegedly knowing about his misconduct.

On 22 November, during the final weekend of the campaign, Simon Harris walked away from an emotional exchange with Charlotte Fallon, a carer from St Joseph's Foundation, in Kanturk, County Cork. Fallon, a worker in a section 39 disability organisation, accused the government of neglecting carers and people with disabilities. Harris dismissed her claims, leading to a tense exchange and his abrupt departure after she called him "not a good man". The incident, captured on video by RTÉ News, drew criticism from activists and opposition politicians who condemned Harris for his dismissive response. Fallon later said she felt "shaken" and upset. Harris rang her the following morning to apologise, admitting he had been "harsh" and should have given her more time. Fine Gael deputy leader Helen McEntee defended Harris, citing the long day of campaigning.

On 23 November Philip Sutcliffe Snr, a councillor for Independent Ireland and candidate for Dublin South-Central, quit the party after controversy arose over his association with Conor McGregor following McGregor being found liable for rape in a civil trial. Another issue was Sutcliffe's reported interest in meeting career criminal Gerry Hutch, who also ran in the election. Sutcliffe faced criticism from party leadership, who deemed his actions and public statements inconsistent with their commitment to law and order.

On 26 November, the Irish Daily Mirror alleged that on 22 November Fine Gael had pressured RTÉ News on how the video of Simon Harris in Kanturk would be framed. Later the same day, Fine Gael confirmed that contact had been made between the party and RTÉ, but insisted that communication between political party press offices and RTÉ was routine and a daily occurrence throughout the campaign. Mary Lou McDonald called the interaction "chilling" (recalling the same remark made by Simon Harris earlier in the campaign towards Sinn Féin) while Gary Gannon of the Social Democrats stated "The Taoiseach cannot have his cake and eat it. There were all sorts of videos put out of him dancing at the start of the campaign. We hear him talking a lot about a new energy but what was clearly lacking was a new empathy". How the political parties interact with the media has been another issue in the campaign. On 19 November during the launch of Sinn Féin's manifesto, it was noted by journalists that the manifesto contained a pledge to investigate RTÉ News coverage of the Gaza war if Sinn Féin enters government. Harris called the measure "chilling" while journalists from several Irish news outlets and the National Union of Journalists expressed deep concern about political interference in news coverage.

Although she was due to give birth, the leader of the Social Democrats Holly Cairns continued to work throughout the campaign, switching to social media in the final week. On 29 November, the day of the poll, Cairns gave birth to a girl.

=== Party manifestos and slogans ===
Party/group		Manifesto (external link)	Other slogan(s)	Refs
Fianna Fáil		Moving Forward. Together.		
Sinn Féin		The Choice for Change	"It's Time for Change"	
Fine Gael		Securing your future	"A New Energy" "Putting money back in people's pockets"	
Green Party		Towards 2030: A decade of change	"Greens Deliver"	
Labour Party		Building Better Together		
Social Democrats		The Future starts here	"For the Future"	
PBP–S	People Before Profit	Another Ireland is possible	"100 years of FG/FF is enough" "End 100 years of FF/FG – Another Ireland is possible"	
PBP–S	Solidarity	Real change, not spare change	"100 years of FG/FF is enough" "End 100 years of FF/FG – Another Ireland is possible"	
Independent Ireland		Common Sense Solutions for a Better Ireland	"Forward Together"	
Aontú		Our Common Sense Manifesto 2024	"It's time for common sense"	

=== Television debates ===
RTÉ hosted two leaders' debates. The first, on 18 November, featured the leaders of ten political parties, and was the largest leaders' debate in Irish history. The second, on 26 November, featured the leaders of the three largest parties: Fine Gael, Fianna Fáil and Sinn Féin.

Three interviews were conducted on Virgin Media ONE with Collete Fitzpatrick with the leaders of the largest three parties: Fine Gael, Fianna Fáil and Sinn Féin. Virgin Media decided against debates, noting RTÉ's bail out and public funding.

Matt Copper's Last Word on Today FM and Sky News offered to host a three-way debate between Fine Gael, Fianna Fáil and Sinn Féin. However, according to Fine Gael an official request was not made.

2024 Irish general election debates
Date	Broadcaster	Moderator(s)	Participants — Name Participant N Party not invited/did not participate										Notes
Date	Broadcaster	Moderator(s)	FF	SF	FG	GP	Lab	SD	PBP–S	II	Aon	RTC	Notes
11 Nov	RTÉ One; Upfront	Katie Hannon	Darragh O'Brien	Ó Broin	Donohoe	N	Bacik	Hearne	Boyd Barrett	N	N	N	Housing spokespeople debate
12 Nov	RTÉ One; Prime Time	Sarah McInerney	Donnelly	Cullinane	N	N	Smith	N	N	N	N	N	Health spokespeople debate
14 Nov	RTÉ One; Prime Time	Fran McNulty	Jim O'Callaghan	Ó Laoghaire	McEntee	N	N	N	N	N	N	N	Justice spokespeople debate
18 Nov	RTÉ One; Upfront	Katie Hannon	Martin	McDonald	Harris	O'Gorman	Bacik	Cian O'Callaghan (Note: Deputy leader Cian O'Callaghan standing in for leader Holly Cairns, due to Cairns being on maternity leave.)	Boyd Barrett	Michael Collins	Tóibín	Joan Collins	Party leaders' debate
21 Nov	RTÉ One; Prime Time	Miriam O'Callaghan	McConalogue	Kenny	Heydon	O'Reilly	N	Moore	N	Fitzmaurice	N	N	Rural issues debate
25 Nov	RTÉ One; Upfront	Katie Hannon	Browne	Carthy	McEntee	O'Gorman	N	N	N	Fitzmaurice	Tóibín	N	Immigration debate
25 Nov	Premier Sports	Matt Cooper	Thomas Byrne	Shane O'Brien	Richmond	N	Moriarty	Gannon	Reneghan	N	N	N	Sports policy debate
26 Nov	RTÉ One; Prime Time	Miriam O'Callaghan; Sarah McInerney	Martin	McDonald	Harris	N	N	N	N	N	N	N	Party leaders' debate featuring the three largest parties

==== 18 November debate ====
The Irish Times stated the key issues discussed in the 18 November debate were housing, cost-of-living pressures, and healthcare, alongside broader questions of governance and political accountability. Housing dominated as the central topic, with Sinn Féin criticising government schemes like Help to Buy and First Homes, while Fine Gael and Fianna Fáil defended their approach. Mary Lou McDonald proposed that stamp duty should be abolished for new buyers. Another topic was how Apple's €14 billion tax payment should be spent. Leaders acknowledged the potential for this to be a "pocketbook election", with housing symbolising broader economic frustrations. During the debate, Fine Gael was criticised by Sinn Féin for running John McGahon as a candidate, who had been found liable for assault in the High Court. Taoiseach Simon Harris stood by McGahon, citing that he had been found not guilty in a trial in the Dundalk Circuit Criminal Court. Harris retorted that Sinn Féin "press officer is in prison tonight"; a reference to the recent conviction in Northern Ireland of Michael McMonagle for child sex offences.

The smaller political parties focused on key issues like governance and policy direction. Independent Ireland's Michael Collins said his party would talk to anyone who would priorise their agenda while People Before Profit's Richard Boyd Barrett advocated for a left-leaning government, rejecting any support for Fine Gael or Fianna Fáil. Joan Collins of Right to Change highlighted public frustration with the two dominant parties and their handling of the housing and health crises. Labour's Ivana Bacik stressed the importance of a centre-left platform and constructive change, while Cian O'Callaghan of the Social Democrats made clear that any government must address housing issues. Aontú's Peadar Tóibín distanced his party from Fine Gael and the Greens but was open to Fianna Fáil, while Green Party leader Roderic O'Gorman underscored that the Greens' participation in any coalition would depend on prioritising green policies.

== Opinion polls ==
On 1 November, Coimisiún na Meán announced the lifting of the reporting moratorium that had been in place since 1997, and which had prevented election coverage from 14:00 on the day prior to the election until the close of polls. However, the agency also advised broadcasters not to report on opinion polls or exit polls while voting is underway.

Various organisations conduct regular opinion polls to gauge voting intentions. Results of such polls are displayed in the graph below.

The date range for these opinion polls is from the previous general election, held on 8 February 2020, to the close of poll for the 2024 general election.

Graph of opinion polls conducted. Trend lines represent local regressions.

== Results ==
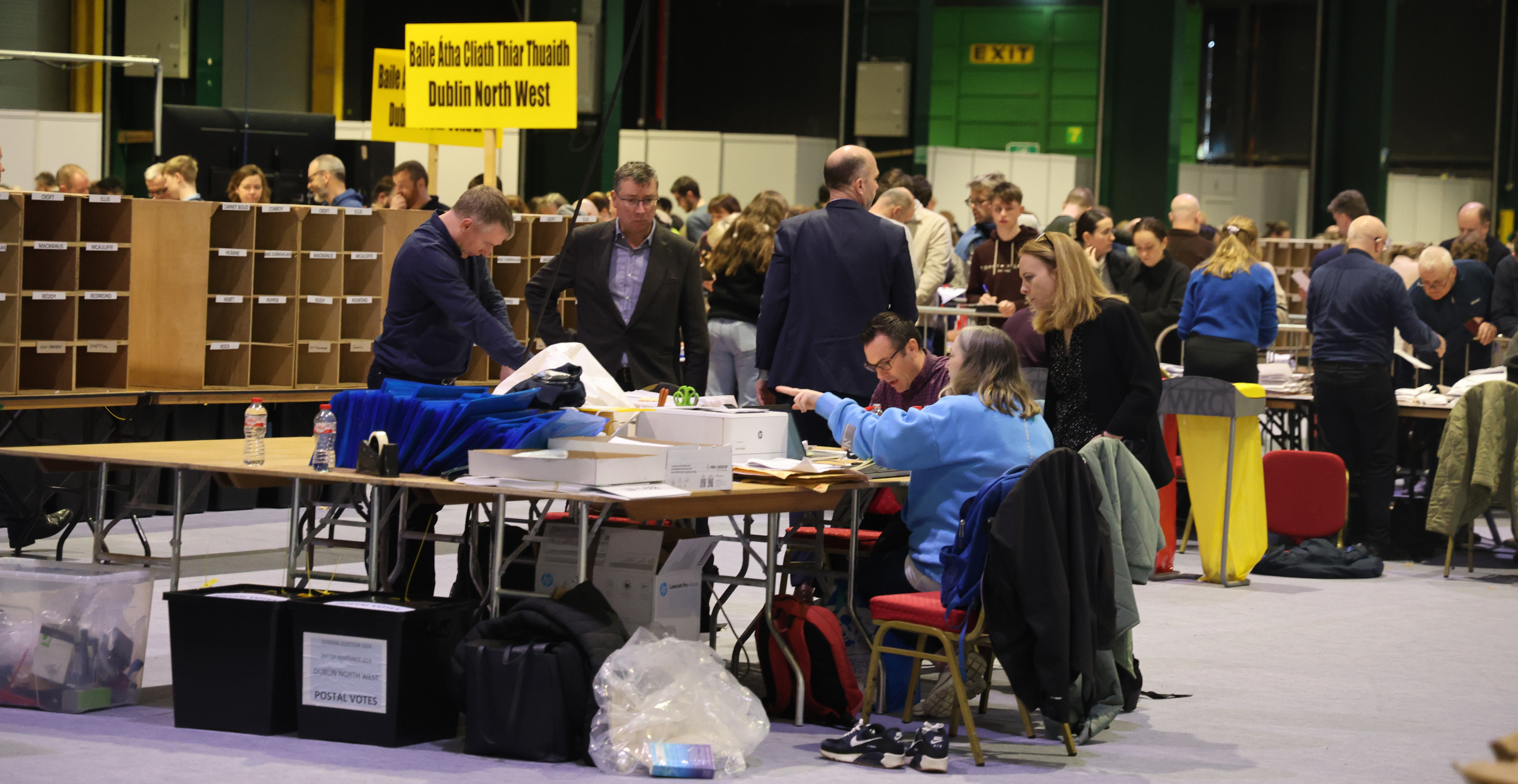
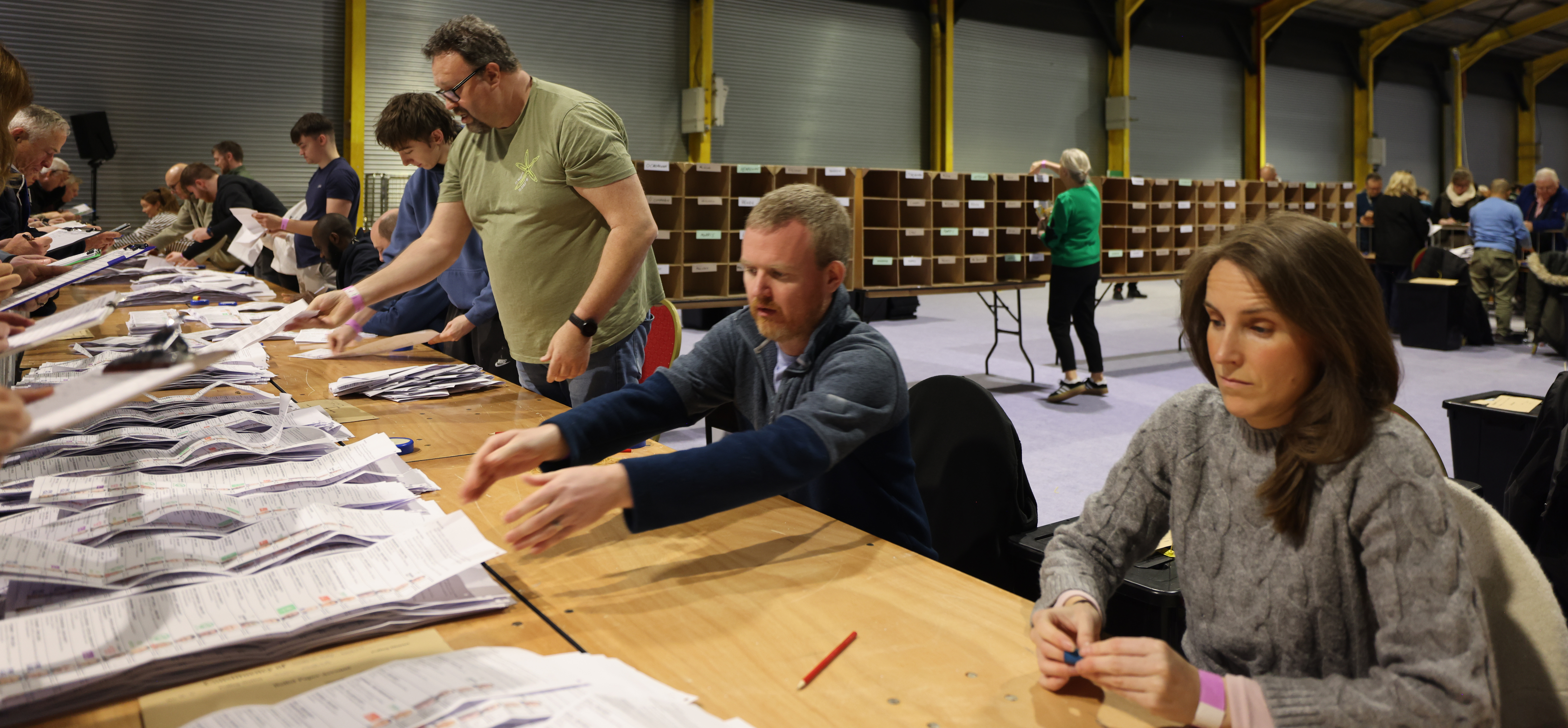
Ballots being counted in the RDS in Dublin

Polls opened at 7 am UTC and closed at 10 pm on 29 November.

Counting of the votes commenced at 9 am on 30 November.

Voter turnout reached a record low. According to RTÉ News, "The national turnout was down to 59.7%, marking the lowest turnout since 1923, the last time the number was below 60%."

Election to the 34th Dáil – 29 November 2024
Party	Leader	First-preference votes			Seats				
Party	Leader	Votes	FPv% (Note: Parties are entitled to public funding proportionate to their first-preference vote (subject to a minimum 2% FPv).)	Swing (pp)	Cand.	2020	Out.	Elected 2024	Change
Fianna Fáil	Micheál Martin	481,414	21.86	▼0.32	82	38 (Note: Including Seán Ó Fearghaíl (FF), returned automatically for Kildare South as outgoing Ceann Comhairle, under Art. 16.6 of the Constitution and the Electoral Act 1992.)	36	48	▲10
Sinn Féin	Mary Lou McDonald	418,627	19.01	▼5.52	71	37	33	39	▲2
Fine Gael	Simon Harris	458,134	20.80	▼0.06	80	35	32	38	▲3
Social Democrats	Holly Cairns	106,028	4.81	▲1.91	26	6	6	11	▲5
Labour	Ivana Bacik	102,457	4.65	▲0.27	32	6	6	11	▲5
Independent Ireland	Michael Collins	78,276	3.55	New	28	New	3	4	New
PBP–Solidarity (Note: People Before Profit and Solidarity contested this election as People Before Profit–Solidarity. People Before Profit had 33 candidates, and Solidarity had 9 candidates. They issued separate manifestos.) •People Before Profit •Solidarity	Collective leadership •Richard Boyd Barrett •Collective leadership	62,481; 49,344; 13,137	2.84; 2.24; 0.60	▲0.21 ▲0.40 ▲0.01	42; 33; 9	5; 4; 1	5; 4; 1	3; 2; 1	▼2 ▼2
Aontú	Peadar Tóibín	86,134	3.91	▲2.01	43	1	1	2	▲1
Green	Roderic O'Gorman	66,911	3.04	▼4.09	43	12	12	1	▼11
100% Redress	Tomás Devine	6,862	0.31	New	1	New	0	1	New
Irish Freedom	Hermann Kelly	14,838	0.67	▲0.42	16	0	0	0	Steady
The Irish People (Note: Member party of the National Alliance)	Anthony Cahill	7,626	0.35	New	21	New	0	0	New
National Party	Disputed	6,511	0.30	▲0.08	9	0	0	0	Steady
Inds. 4 Change	None	5,166	0.23	▼0.15	3	1	0	0	▼1
Ireland First	Derek Blighe	3,339	0.15	New	2	New	0	0	New
Right to Change	Joan Collins	2,907	0.13	New	1	New	1	0	New
Liberty Republic	Ben Gilroy	1,936	0.09	New	6	New	0	0	New
Party for Animal Welfare	Darren Furlong	884	0.04	New	3	New	0	0	New
Rabharta	Lorna Bogue	626	0.03	New	3	New	0	0	New
Centre Party (Note: Formerly Renua.)	Andrew Kelly	548	0.02	▼0.23	3	0	0	0	Steady
Independent (Note: Includes Séamus Healy who was a member of the Workers and Unemployed Action party but stood as an independent candidate in this election.)	—	290,748	13.20	▲1.00	171	19	20	16	▼3
Vacant	—N/a	—N/a	—N/a	—N/a	—N/a	—N/a	5	—N/a	—N/a
Total valid		2,202,453	99.3						
Spoilt votes		15,849	0.7						
Total		2,218,302	100	—	686	160	160	174	▲14
Registered voters/Turnout		3,715,285	59.71	▼3.00					
Source : Houses Of the Oireachtas

=== Seats summary ===
Dáil seats
Fianna Fáil	27.6%
Sinn Féin	22.4%
Fine Gael	21.8%
Labour	6.3%
Social Democrats	6.3%
Independent Ireland	2.3%
PBP–Solidarity	1.7%
Aontú	1.1%
Green	0.6%
100% Redress	0.6%
Independent	9.2%

=== Results and first preference votes by constituency ===
Constituency	FF	SF	FG	SD	Lab	II	PBP–S	Aon	GP	Other	Ind	Seats	Quota	Valid ballots	Spoiled ballots	Electorate	Turnout
Carlow–Kilkenny	35.9	17.2	23.6	4.9	2.5	—N/a	2.1	3.4	4.2	1.3	4.9	5	11,627	69,761	563	120,821	58.2
Cavan–Monaghan	27.0	32.8	21.4	—N/a	—N/a	4.4	1.4	7.4	1.1	2.8	1.7	5	11,542	69,246	658	109,152	64.0
Clare	37.8	12.9	24.6	3.5	—N/a	4.2	1.3	3.4	6.2	2.4	3.6	4	12,182	60,907	459	96,398	63.7
Cork East	23.1	13.7	23.1	10.0	—N/a	2.0	1.4	3.7	3.4	0.7	18.9	4	9,602	48,009	317	83,545	57.8
Cork North-Central	23.5	17.4	16.7	5.9	10.2	9.7	5.9	3.2	2.1	4.2	1.2	5	9,846	59,071	552	102,250	58.3
Cork North-West	36.7	12.7	34.8	—N/a	—N/a	2.2	2.0	7.9	2.5	—N/a	1.3	3	10,712	42,844	266	67,255	64.1
Cork South-Central	36.8	15.4	16.2	8.6	4.8	0.7	1.4	3.6	3.4	2.8	7.1	5	10,451	62,704	423	105,076	60.1
Cork South-West	19.3	4.8	23.5	19.9	0.9	23.3	0.7	1.5	0.7	0.6	4.7	3	11,824	47,294	215	74,364	63.9
Donegal	23.9	41.8	9.0	—N/a	—N/a	—N/a	0.8	3.2	1.1	10.2	10.0	5	12,771	76,624	697	131,306	58.9
Dublin Bay North	18.9	19.7	17.2	14.9	4.5	—N/a	3.1	3.8	3.2	4.5	10.4	5	10,929	65,568	524	110,574	59.8
Dublin Bay South	13.9	12.3	25.5	9.1	14.3	—N/a	3.4	2.4	8.2	0.4	10.6	4	7,957	39,784	195	83,689	47.8
Dublin Central	7.2	23.3	16.8	13.3	7.5	—N/a	4.5	2.2	6.0	4.9	14.3	4	6,551	32,754	273	63,190	52.3
Dublin Fingal East	26.0	14.4	14.2	10.6	14.2	—N/a	2.0	4.1	3.6	8.1	2.8	3	9,475	37,899	156	62,465	58.9
Dublin Fingal West	14.7	23.1	15.2	—N/a	16.7	—N/a	4.6	3.9	6.1	3.2	12.4	3	7,530	30,117	168	51,455	58.9
Dublin Mid-West	11.8	32.0	17.9	6.1	4.8	3.8	5.5	3.1	1.3	3.8	9.7	5	7,913	47,476	454	85,769	55.9
Dublin North-West	13.6	30.7	11.9	14.1	2.4	—N/a	8.9	4.2	2.9	4.3	7.0	3	8,184	32,733	300	58,462	56.5
Dublin Rathdown	15.0	7.3	33.7	8.8	6.2	—N/a	2.7	3.7	8.5	0.8	13.3	4	9,752	48,759	241	80,852	60.6
Dublin South-Central	10.7	31.2	8.2	9.0	6.6	2.3	8.9	3.9	6.1	11.0	2.2	4	7,469	37,344	475	77,072	49.1
Dublin South-West	19.5	20.8	19.1	5.9	8.7	—N/a	7.6	3.9	2.9	2.2	9.5	5	11,138	66,823	558	114,832	58.7
Dublin West	22.3	21.0	15.4	4.9	5.5	—N/a	8.0	5.5	6.6	2.6	8.1	5	7,373	44,236	357	78,034	57.1
Dún Laoghaire	15.9	9.0	36.0	7.5	5.7	—N/a	12.2	4.3	7.7	1.2	0.6	4	11,134	55,669	247	95,462	58.6
Galway East	26.2	13.8	21.7	—N/a	—N/a	9.5	2.3	2.9	2.3	1.1	20.3	4	10,843	54,214	362	87,791	62.2
Galway West	16.8	13.5	18.8	3.6	3.3	9.5	1.5	2.0	3.1	1.5	26.4	5	10,047	60,277	375	103,713	58.5
Kerry	26.2	16.3	10.1	—N/a	2.3	1.3	1.3	1.8	2.5	0.9	37.2	5	13,083	78,495	504	120,868	65.4
Kildare North	25.6	14.1	23.3	13.3	5.9	—N/a	2.0	3.8	3.6	3.3	5.1	5	9,505	57,029	357	95,055	60.4
Kildare South	17.4	16.9	21.6	7.4	15.5	2.5	1.2	3.9	1.4	2.2	10.1	4 (Note: One seat was reserved for the Ceann Comhairle who was automatically returned. Only 3 TDs could be elected.)	10,734	42,934	271	74,243	58.2
Laois	22.5	12.8	24.2	—N/a	—N/a	—N/a	1.9	2.7	2.0	—N/a	33.8	3	9,570	38,276	231	65,873	58.5
Limerick City	26.2	17.3	21.2	6.7	6.5	1.6	1.7	4.7	4.2	2.3	7.6	4	8,435	42,174	316	77,753	54.7
Limerick County	24.1	13.2	28.7	—N/a	—N/a	23.1	0.9	2.9	1.9	1.7	3.4	3	11,385	45,536	332	75,018	61.1
Longford–Westmeath	22.4	15.1	29.8	—N/a	2.5	4.8	1.6	3.1	0.7	1.4	18.5	5	10,315	61,884	469	106,814	58.4
Louth	16.8	32.4	15.2	2.4	11.9	0.5	2.6	3.7	2.4	4.2	8.0	5	10,623	63,735	675	104,799	61.5
Mayo	20.0	19.4	35.1	—N/a	—N/a	3.5	1.7	6.3	1.3	—N/a	12.7	5	11,812	70,866	451	112,205	63.6
Meath East	19.3	22.1	26.3	—N/a	4.1	—N/a	2.8	6.6	1.7	2.0	15.3	4	9,997	49,983	338	84,272	59.7
Meath West	17.3	22.8	16.3	6.7	1.1	—N/a	1.3	20.1	1.5	1.7	11.1	3	9,427	37,705	230	65,148	58.2
Offaly	23.8	16.6	17.6	—N/a	—N/a	5.5	1.5	0.8	2.5	—N/a	31.5	3	9,347	37,385	249	62,931	59.8
Roscommon–Galway	17.7	19.5	17.0	—N/a	—N/a	29.2	2.0	1.9	1.1	0.5	11.0	3	10,283	41,128	204	62,727	65.9
Sligo–Leitrim	25.4	22.7	15.8	—N/a	3.7	10.6	2.9	2.0	1.3	2.1	13.6	4	11,381	56,900	416	94,040	60.9
Tipperary North	23.1	9.5	9.7	—N/a	15.5	—N/a	1.4	1.9	1.6	1.0	36.4	3	11,442	45,766	341	70,214	65.7
Tipperary South	14.2	12.0	20.4	—N/a	4.2	0.4	—N/a	1.2	1.4	0.8	45.4	3	10,270	41,079	284	68,247	60.6
Waterford	18.6	33.0	19.3	5.1	2.8	—N/a	1.2	3.1	3.1	0.9	12.9	4	10,731	53,650	363	97,153	55.6
Wexford	16.9	14.5	15.0	—N/a	13.8	—N/a	1.5	7.2	1.4	4.0	25.6	4	10,502	52,508	336	85,744	61.6
Wicklow	6.2	14.8	34.9	13.5	3.5	—N/a	2.2	2.2	4.1	0.4	18.1	4	11,415	57,071	340	84,669	67.8
Wicklow–Wexford	36.1	20.2	23.1	—N/a	—N/a	1.7	2.7	3.5	2.3	—N/a	10.4	3	9,560	38,236	301	63,003	61.2
Total	21.86	19.01	20.80	4.81	4.65	3.55	2.84	3.91	3.04	2.31	13.20	174	10,155	2,202,454	15,843	3,689,896	59.7

=== TDs who lost their seats ===
Party	Seats lost	Name	Constituency	Other offices held	Year elected
Green	10	Patrick Costello	Dublin South-Central		2020
Green	10	Francis Noel Duffy	Dublin South-West		2020
Green	10	Neasa Hourigan	Dublin Central		2020
Green	10	Brian Leddin	Limerick City		2020
Green	10	Catherine Martin	Dublin Rathdown	Minister for Tourism, Culture, Arts, Gaeltacht, Sport and Media	2016
Green	10	Steven Matthews	Wicklow		2020
Green	10	Malcolm Noonan	Carlow–Kilkenny	Minister of State at the Department of Housing, Local Government and Heritage	2020
Green	10	Joe O'Brien	Dublin Fingal West	Minister of State at the Department of Rural and Community Development; Minister of State at the Department of Social Protection; Minister of State at the Department of Children, Disability and Equality	2019
Green	10	Marc Ó Cathasaigh	Waterford		2020
Green	10	Ossian Smyth	Dún Laoghaire	Minister of State at the Department of Public Expenditure, National Development Plan Delivery and Reform; Minister of State at the Department of the Environment, Climate and Communications	2020
Sinn Féin	3	Chris Andrews	Dublin Bay South		2007 (Note: Andrews lost his seat in 2011 but regained it in 2020.)
Sinn Féin	3	Martin Browne	Tipperary South		2020
Sinn Féin	3	Pauline Tully	Cavan–Monaghan		2020
Fianna Fáil	3	Stephen Donnelly	Wicklow	Minister for Health	2011
Fianna Fáil	3	Joe Flaherty	Longford–Westmeath		2020
Fianna Fáil	3	Anne Rabbitte	Galway East	Minister of State at the Department of Children, Equality, Disability, Integration and Youth	2016
PBP–Solidarity	2	Mick Barry	Cork North-Central		2016
PBP–Solidarity	2	Gino Kenny	Dublin Mid-West		2016
Fine Gael	2	Bernard Durkan	Kildare North		1981 (Note: Durkan was first elected to the Kildare constituency in 1981.)
Fine Gael	2	Alan Farrell	Dublin Fingal East		2011
Right to Change	1	Joan Collins	Dublin South-Central		2011
Independent	5	Cathal Berry	Kildare South		2020
Independent	5	Thomas Pringle	Donegal		2011
Independent	5	Patricia Ryan	Kildare South		2020
Independent	5	Matt Shanahan	Waterford		2020
Independent	5	Violet-Anne Wynne	Clare		2020

Violet-Anne Wynne and Patricia Ryan were elected as Sinn Féin TDs in 2020. However, both left the party before the election, running as independents. The 2024 election saw their first preference votes evaporate, with Wynne's diminishing by 96% and Ryan's by 93%, and both were eliminated extremely early. Some political commentators have suggested these might have been the greatest drops in first preference votes in Irish political history.

=== First time TDs ===
The 2024 election cycle was noted for the high rate of turnover in TDs. In this election, 66 candidates who had never sat in the Dáil previously were elected.

Party	No. of first time TDs	Name	Constituency
Fine Gael	22		
Fine Gael	22	William Aird	Laois
Fine Gael	22	Grace Boland	Dublin Fingal West
Fine Gael	22	Brian Brennan	Wicklow–Wexford
Fine Gael	22	Paula Butterly	Louth
Fine Gael	22	Micheál Carrigy	Longford–Westmeath
Fine Gael	22	Catherine Callaghan	Carlow–Kilkenny
Fine Gael	22	John Clendennen	Offaly
Fine Gael	22	Joe Cooney	Clare
Fine Gael	22	Emer Currie	Dublin West
Fine Gael	22	John Cummins	Waterford
Fine Gael	22	James Geoghegan	Dublin Bay South
Fine Gael	22	Keira Keogh	Mayo
Fine Gael	22	Noel McCarthy	Cork East
Fine Gael	22	David Maxwell	Cavan–Monaghan
Fine Gael	22	Michael Murphy	Tipperary South
Fine Gael	22	Joe Neville	Kildare North
Fine Gael	22	Maeve O'Connell	Dublin Rathdown
Fine Gael	22	Naoise Ó Muirí	Dublin Bay North
Fine Gael	22	John Paul O'Shea	Cork North-West
Fine Gael	22	Peter Roche	Galway East
Fine Gael	22	Edward Timmins	Wicklow
Fine Gael	22	Barry Ward	Dún Laoghaire
Fianna Fáil	15		
Fianna Fáil	15	Catherine Ardagh	Dublin South-Central
Fianna Fáil	15	Tom Brabazon	Dublin Bay North
Fianna Fáil	15	Shay Brennan	Dublin Rathdown
Fianna Fáil	15	Michael Cahill	Kerry
Fianna Fáil	15	Peter Cleere	Carlow–Kilkenny
Fianna Fáil	15	John Connolly	Galway West
Fianna Fáil	15	Martin Daly	Roscommon–Galway
Fianna Fáil	15	Aisling Dempsey	Meath West
Fianna Fáil	15	Albert Dolan	Galway East
Fianna Fáil	15	Erin McGreehan	Louth
Fianna Fáil	15	Séamus McGrath	Cork South-Central
Fianna Fáil	15	Tony McCormack	Offaly
Fianna Fáil	15	Shane Moynihan	Dublin Mid-West
Fianna Fáil	15	Naoise Ó Cearúil	Kildare North
Fianna Fáil	15	Ryan O'Meara	Tipperary North
Sinn Féin	10		
Sinn Féin	10	Cathy Bennett	Cavan–Monaghan
Sinn Féin	10	Joanna Byrne	Louth
Sinn Féin	10	Máire Devine	Dublin South-Central
Sinn Féin	10	Natasha Newsome Drennan	Carlow–Kilkenny
Sinn Féin	10	Ann Graves	Dublin Fingal East
Sinn Féin	10	Donna McGettigan	Clare
Sinn Féin	10	Conor D. McGuinness	Waterford
Sinn Féin	10	Shónagh Ní Raghallaigh	Kildare South
Sinn Féin	10	Louis O'Hara	Galway East
Sinn Féin	10	Fionntán Ó Súilleabháin	Wicklow–Wexford
Social Democrats	7		
Social Democrats	7	Jen Cummins	Dublin South-Central
Social Democrats	7	Aidan Farrelly	Kildare North
Social Democrats	7	Sinéad Gibney	Dublin Rathdown
Social Democrats	7	Eoin Hayes	Dublin Bay South
Social Democrats	7	Rory Hearne	Dublin North-West
Social Democrats	7	Liam Quaide	Cork East
Social Democrats	7	Pádraig Rice	Cork South-Central
Labour	7		
Labour	7	Ciarán Ahern	Dublin South-West
Labour	7	Eoghan Kenny	Cork North-Central
Labour	7	George Lawlor	Wexford
Labour	7	Robert O'Donoghue	Dublin Fingal West
Labour	7	Conor Sheehan	Limerick City
Labour	7	Marie Sherlock	Dublin Central
Labour	7	Mark Wall	Kildare South
Independent	2		
Independent	2	Barry Heneghan	Dublin Bay North
Independent	2	Gillian Toole	Meath East
Independent Ireland	1		
Independent Ireland	1	Ken O'Flynn	Cork North-Central
Aontú	1		
Aontú	1	Paul Lawless	Mayo
100% Redress	1		
100% Redress	1	Charles Ward	Donegal

== Aftermath ==
Fianna Fáil and Fine Gael won a combined 86 seats, just two short of the 88 required for a majority. Political commentators suggested that these parties could form a government, either as a minority government supported by independents, or in coalition with Labour or the Social Democrats. A minority government supported by Independents was subsequently formed after several rounds of negotiations and separate announcements by both Labour and the Social Democrats that they would not go into government with Fine Gael and Fianna Fáil.

Sinn Féin, which increased its number of seats from 37 to 39, became the second-largest party in the Dail and began negotiating with the same two parties to form a left-wing minority government. These negotiations ultimately fell through when no agreements could be reached in time.

The Green Party, the third coalition partner in the Government of the 33rd Dail, lost all but one of its 12 TDs, making it one of the heaviest defeats suffered by the party in its history. Only the party leader, Roderic O'Gorman, retained his seat. Post-election analyses attributed the party's defeat to backlash against its decision to enter into the previous government coalition.

The Social Democrats had their best election result to date, increasing their number of seats from 6 to 11. Party leader Holly Cairns, who won re-election in Cork South-West, will be on maternity leave for the first 9 months of her term as she gave birth to a daughter on election day, making her the first Irish party leader to give birth while in office. Party deputy leader Cian O'Callaghan stepped in as interim party leader in her absence. On 10 December 2024, O'Callaghan announced that newly elected Social Democrats TD Eoin Hayes had been suspended from the party for an unspecified amount of time for violating the party's policies regarding Israel and Gaza; the suspension was later made indefinite. This brought the number of Social Democrat TDs down to 10. On 25 July 2025, Hayes was readmitted back into the Social Democrats following an announcement from O'Callaghan, bringing the Social Democrats back up to 11 TDs.

The Labour Party increased its number of seats from six to 11. In a statement released after the election, Labour stated that it would only enter government with a "progressive, left-of-centre bloc with like-minded parties", as well as outlining their basic platform for negotiation. On 19 December, Labour stated that it would not join a coalition with Fianna Fáil and Fine Gael. Labour entered the Opposition after negotiations with Sinn Féin fell through.

On 17 December, Fianna Fáil and Fine Gael agreed to support Verona Murphy's candidacy for the position of Ceann Comhairle, in order to facilitate government formation talks between the two parties and the Regional Independent Group, of which Murphy was a member. The 34th Dáil met for the first time the next day and she was elected on the third count.

Negotiations on the formation of a coalition government continued over the Christmas and New Year period. On 15 January 2025, it was announced that an agreement had been reached to form a coalition government consisting of Fianna Fáil, Fine Gael and a number of independents from the Independent and Regional Independents technical groups, with Micheál Martin to be nominated as Taoiseach and Simon Harris as Tánaiste, and with three independent TDs to receive junior ministries. A programme for government was published later that day. Controversy arose in the following days when it was announced that some of those independents who were supporting the new government's formation but would not be receiving ministries were seeking to form a Dáil technical group to retain opposition speaking time. This was condemned by opposition parties, with Sinn Féin threatening legal action if Verona Murphy, the Ceann Comhairle—who prior to her election to that office had been a member of that same technical group—permitted this to happen.

The Dáil resumed on 22 January, but procedural disputes over the technical group issue overshadowed events, resulting in chaotic scenes as the Dáil was suspended four times, with no nominations for Taoiseach being taken. Aontú resigned from the Regional Independent Group, and joined the Independent Group. On 23 January, Micheál Martin was nominated for appointment as Taoiseach in a 95–76 vote by the Dáil.

== Seanad election ==
The Dáil election was followed by the 2025 Seanad election to the 27th Seanad, in which polls closed on the 29 and 30 January.

== See also ==
- 2024 elections in the European Union
