= 1985 Kildare County Council election =

Part of the 1985 Irish local elections

← 1979	20 June 1985	1991 →

All 25 seats on Kildare County Council
	First party	Second party	Third party
Party	Fianna Fáil	Fine Gael	Labour
Seats won	10	7	5
Seat change	+1	-1	+1
	Fourth party	Fifth party	Sixth party
Party	Workers' Party	Sinn Féin	Independent
Seats won	1	1	1
Seat change	+1	+1	+1
- Map showing the area of Kildare County Council
Council control after election
TBD

An election to Kildare County Council took place on 20 June 1985 as part of the 1985 Irish local elections. 25 councillors were elected from five local electoral areas (LEAs) for a five-year term of office on the electoral system of proportional representation by means of the single transferable vote (PR-STV). This term was extended for a further year, to 1991.

== Results by party ==
Party	Seats	±	First Pref. votes	FPv%	±%
Fianna Fáil	10	+1	17,205	42.91	
Fine Gael	7	-1	9,294	23.18	
Labour	5	+1	8,563	21.36	
Workers' Party	1	+1	1,035	2.58	
Sinn Féin	1	+1	875	2.18	
Independent	1	+1	3,125	7.79	
Totals	25	+4	40,335	100.00	—

== Results by local electoral area ==
=== Athy ===
Athy: 4 seats
Party	Candidate	FPv%	Count							
Party	Candidate	FPv%	1	2	3	4	5	6	7	8
Labour	Joseph Bermingham TD*		1,572							
Fianna Fáil	Martin Miley*		1,102	1,115	1,162	1,186	1,515			
Sinn Féin	Paddy Wright		875	907	944	988	1,071	1,085	1,105	1,126
Fine Gael	Reggie Lalor		767	798	872	989	1,066	1,077	1,585	
Fianna Fáil	Lenore O'Rourke-Glynn		571	585	655	671				
Fine Gael	Rainsford Hendy		565	575	614	694	704	706		
Fianna Fáil	Robert Byrne		555	564	613	697	806	927	982	1,063
Labour	Michael Cullen*		434	515	559					
Independent	Jack McKenna		203	207						
Fianna Fáil	Megan Maguire		191	201						
Electorate: 11,921 Valid: 6,835 (58.46%) Spoilt: 134 Quota: 1,367 Turnout: 6,969

=== Celbridge ===
Celbridge: 5 seats
Party	Candidate	FPv%	Count								
Party	Candidate	FPv%	1	2	3	4	5	6	7	8	9
Labour	Emmet Stagg*		2,784								
Fianna Fáil	Gerry Brady		1,045	1,226	1,229	1,241	1,245	1,567			
Fine Gael	Bernard Durkan TD*		1,001	1,296	1,309	1,571					
Fine Gael	Jim Gallagher*		729	836	846	908	1,100	1,135	1,150	1,257	1,280
Workers' Party	Colm Purcell		722	1,226	1,282	1,293	1,299	1,331	1,340	1,413	
Independent	Finbarr Kelly		575	614	626	627	627	690	807	1,250	1,275
Fianna Fáil	Paul Kelly		537	601	606	609	610	639	700		
Fianna Fáil	Mairead Byrne		411	508	516	538	541				
Fine Gael	Jim Condra		285	380	387						
Independent	Micheal O'Connell		100	137							
Electorate: 15,118 Valid: 8,189 (54.59%) Spoilt: 53 Quota: 1,365 Turnout: 8,242

=== Clane ===
Clane: 4 seats
Party	Candidate	FPv%	Count							
Party	Candidate	FPv%	1	2	3	4	5	6	7	8
Fine Gael	Sean Reilly*		1,511							
Fianna Fáil	Liam Doyle		1,019	1,026	1,038	1,062	1,129	1,238	1,340	2,038
Fianna Fáil	Austin Groome*		1,011	1,017	1,050	1,111	1,147	1,623		
Fianna Fáil	P.J. Sheridan		817	833	841	851	922	991	1,131	
Fianna Fáil	Michael Fitzpatrick		715	729	767	787	806			
Labour	Jim Reilly		545	553	609	776	1,092	1,137	1,154	1,230
Labour	Joe McBride		434	441	658	732				
Labour	Peggy Fox		393	402						
Fine Gael	Noel Duffy		372	452	473					
Electorate: 11,132 Valid: 6,817 (61.94%) Spoilt: 78 Quota: 1,364 Turnout: 6,895

=== Kildare ===
Kildare: 5 seats
Party	Candidate	FPv%	Count								
Party	Candidate	FPv%	1	2	3	4	5	6	7	8	9
Fianna Fáil	Jimmy O'Loughlin*		1,158	1,168	1,176	1,200					
Fianna Fáil	Paddy Aspell*		1,088	1,090	1,135	1,156	1,389				
Fianna Fáil	Seán Ó Fearghail		825	832	840	853	1,042	1,107	1,128	1,159	1,584
Fine Gael	Michael McWey*		677	736	908	956	1,017	1,036	1,434		
Labour	Kieran Coleman		641	659	671	880	929	939	1,009	1,121	1,200
Fianna Fáil	Ted Rooney		622	626	634	644					
Fianna Fáil	Denis Mahon		534	588	593	751	815	911	967	1,003	
Labour	Con Carr		522	576	591						
Fine Gael	Margot Conlon		424	509	602	665	677	680			
Fine Gael	Trudy Jeffers		346	376							
Fine Gael	Billy Cleary		333								
Electorate: 13,776 Valid: 7,170 (52.66%) Spoilt: 85 Quota: 1,196 Turnout: 7,255

=== Naas ===
Naas: 7 seats
Party	Candidate	FPv%	Count														
Party	Candidate	FPv%	1	2	3	4	5	6	7	8	9	10	11	12	13	14	15
Fianna Fáil	Paddy Power*		1,788														
Fianna Fáil	John O'Neill*		1,293	1,400													
Independent	Patsy Lawlor*		1,253	1,270	1,330	1,331	1,388										
Labour	Sen. Timmy Conway*		774	786	808	808	841	854	926	1,023	1,024	1,042	1,225	1,332	1,485		
Fine Gael	Michael Nolan, Snr*		734	746	750	751	757	793	957	966	966	977	1,133	1,334	1,423		
Fine Gael	Billy Hillis		637	643	647	647	655	659	745	754	754	820	841	1,003	1,033	1,063	1,120
Fianna Fáil	Mary Robinson		523	616	628	634	647	676	688	718	718	883	913	935	986	1,003	
Fianna Fáil	Paddy Behan		523	578	603	605	644	655	669	758	759	936	965	1,009	1,093	1,113	1,715
Fianna Fáil	Peter Kavanagh		493	531	538	541	547	559	564	581	581						
Labour	Colm Feeney		464	471	478	479	492	546	559	582	582	594					
Fine Gael	John Malone		458	483	494	494	505	510									
Fine Gael	Pat O'Reilly		455	458	475	475	511	513	603	625	625	633	646				
Independent	Norman Croke		429	433	441	441	461	551	562	654	654	665	713	723			
Independent	Evelyn Bracken		416	422	443	443	497	526	533								
Workers' Party	Dan O'Sullivan		313	317	322	322	330										
Independent	Donal Corcoran		287	292	322	322											
Independent	Michael Lawlor		246	254													
Electorate: 20,849 Valid: 11,086 (53.91%) Spoilt: 154 Quota: 1,386 Turnout: 11,240
