= Harristown (civil parish) =

Civil parish in County Kildare, formerly of King's County

Coordinates: 53.0930°N 6.9619°W

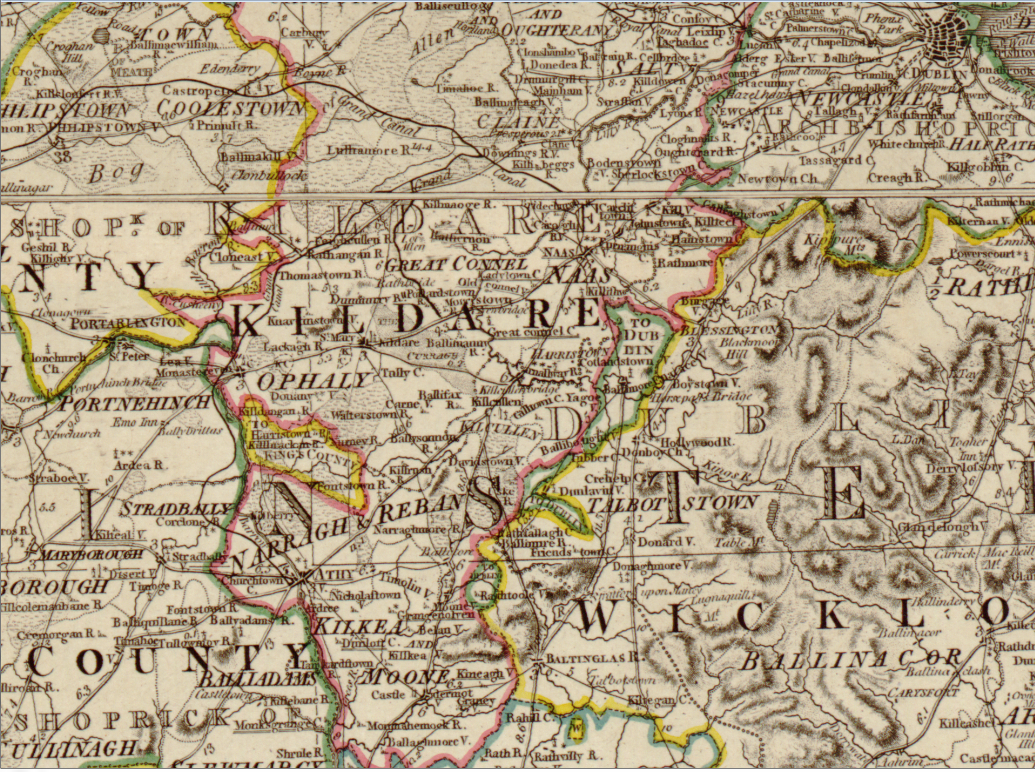
Detail from Daniel Augustus Beaufort's 1797 map of Ireland, showing the area of Harristown as an exclave of King's County, between Queen's County and Kildare.

Harristown (Irish: Baile Hanraí) is a civil parish and electoral division (ED) in County Kildare in Ireland, about 4 miles (6.4 km) southwest of Kildare town.

Until 1842 the parish was part of an exclave of the barony of Upper Philipstown in King's County (now County Offaly).

In the Church of Ireland until the Irish Church Act 1869 the parish benefice was a rectory and vicarage in the diocese of Kildare, forming the corps of the prebend of Harristown in Kildare Cathedral, in the patronage of the bishop. The civil parish of Harristown contains the following 16 townlands: Bawn, Boghall, Boherbaun Lower, Boherbaun Upper or Monapheeby, Cherrymills, Clarey, Cloneybeg, Coolagh, Eskerhill, Harristown (Lower and Upper), Lenagorra, Mylerstown, Pullagh, and Rickardstown (Lower and Upper).

In 1841 Harristown civil parish was added to the existing Ballybrackan ED of the poor law union of Athy. By 1851 a separate Harristown ED had been created, with an area of 5,142.5 acres (2,081.1 ha), comprising 18 townlands: all 16 in Harristown civil parish plus Gorteen Upper and Lower from the civil parish of Fontstown. From 1899 the ED was in Athy No.1 rural district. In elections to Kildare County Council, Harristown ED has been in local electoral areas centred on either Athy (1991 and since 2009) or Kildare (1955–1985, 1999–2004).

Census population of Harristown civil parish and/or ED
Year→ ↓Area	1821	1831	1841	1851	1861	1871	1881	1891	1901	1911	1926	1936	1946	1956	1966	1979	1991	2002	2011	2016
Parish	1,037	1,020	920	662	591	535	502	427	368	325									418	440
ED	—	—	1,010	720	628	565	536	459	397	341	320	332	347	352	300	253	302	343	452	477

== See also ==
- Harristown House, a stately home within the civil parish
