= 1999 Kildare County Council election =

Part of the 1999 Irish local elections

← 1991	10 June 1999	2004 →

All 25 seats to Kildare County Council
	First party	Second party	Third party
Party	Fianna Fáil	Labour	Fine Gael
Seats won	9	5	5
Seat change	+1	+2	-2
	Fourth party	Fifth party	Sixth party
Party	Progressive Democrats	Independent	Green
Seats won	2	4	0
Seat change	0	+2	-1
	Seventh party	Eighth party
Party	Sinn Féin	Workers' Party
Seats won	0	0
Seat change	-1	-1
- Map showing the area of Kildare County Council
Council control after election
TBD

An election to Kildare County Council took place on 10 June 1999 as part of that year's Irish local elections. 25 councillors were elected from six local electoral areas on the system of proportional representation by means of the single transferable vote (PR-STV) for a five-year term of office.

== Results by party ==
Party	Seats	±	First Pref. votes	FPv%	±%
Fianna Fáil	9	+1	15,485	33.78	
Labour	5	+2	8,771	19.14	
Fine Gael	5	-2	8,095	17.66	
Progressive Democrats	2	0	1,685	3.68	
Independent	4	+2	9,551	20.84	
Green	0	-1	1,744	3.80	
Sinn Féin	0	-1	506	1.10	
Workers' Party	0	-1	0	N/A	
Totals	25	0	45,837	100.00	—

== Results by local electoral area ==
=== Athy ===
Athy - 3 seats
Party	Candidate	FPv%	Count					
Party	Candidate	FPv%	1	2	3	4	5	6
Labour	Jack Wall TD	20.93	1,382					
Fine Gael	Rainsford Hendy*	19.25	1,271	1,286	1,393	1,419	1,590	1,785
Fianna Fáil	Martin Miley*	17.81	1,176	1,187	1,210	1,292	1,563	2,313
Fianna Fáil	Mark Dalton	16.04	1,059	1,068	1,092	1,197	1,400	
Fianna Fáil	Vincent Corcoran	11.07	731	754	756	759		
Sinn Féin	Paddy Wright*	7.66	506	521	541			
Fine Gael	John Lynch	3.74	247	250				
Labour	Mags O'Brien	3.48	230					
Electorate: 12,461 Valid: 6,602 (52.98%) Spoilt: 130 Quota: 1,651 Turnout: 6,732 (54.02%)

=== Celbridge ===
Celbridge - 3 seats
Party	Candidate	FPv%	Count					
Party	Candidate	FPv%	1	2	3	4	5	6
Independent	Kate Walsh	43.14	2,167					
Labour	Emmet Stagg TD	25.14	1,263					
Fianna Fáil	Geraldine Conway	9.14	459	617	646	713	786	1,120
Fianna Fáil	Gay Boylan	7.39	371	531	560	600	672	
Green	Marie Percival	4.06	204	380	411			
Fine Gael	Mark Clinton	4.04	203	309	424	497		
Independent	Mairead Byrne	3.96	199	391	425	551	723	929
Fine Gael	Brian Mullarkey	3.13	157	276				
Electorate: 11,182 Valid: 5,023 (44.92) Spoilt: 35 Quota: 1,256 Turnout: 5,058 (45.23%)

=== Clane ===
Clane - 4 seats
Party	Candidate	FPv%	Count								
Party	Candidate	FPv%	1	2	3	4	5	6	7	8	9
Fianna Fáil	Michael Fitzpatrick	17.26	1,352	1,385	1,406	1,426	1,477	1,498	1,510	1,546	1,578
Independent	Tony McEvoy	17.25	1,351	1,365	1,380	1,438	1,514	1,717			
Fianna Fáil	P.J. Sheridan*	13.06	1,023	1,030	1,038	1,062	1,078	1,106	1,121	1,296	1,354
Fine Gael	Jim Reilly*	12.05	944	951	1,001	1,026	1,192	1,236	1,256	1,692	
Fine Gael	Brendan Weld	9.37	734	743	756	796	837	917	948		
Fianna Fáil	Seamus Davey	8.23	645	647	664	751	810	986	1,015	1,134	1,169
Independent	John Nealon	6.50	509	511	514	594	667				
Independent	Bernie Holton	5.45	427	432	538	583					
Labour	Rose Murphy	4.61	361	417	502						
Labour	Garry Stynes	4.21	330	350							
Labour	Joan Mooney	2.02	158								
Electorate: 16,438 Valid: 7,834 (47.66%) Spoilt: 113 Quota: 1,567 Turnout: 7,947 (48.35%)

=== Kildare ===
Kildare - 6 seats
Party	Candidate	FPv%	Count										
Party	Candidate	FPv%	1	2	3	4	5	6	7	8	9	10	11
Fianna Fáil	Seán Ó Fearghail*	16.32	1,737										
Fianna Fáil	Fiona O'Loughlin	14.02	1,492	1,546									
Fine Gael	Fionnuala Dukes	10.02	1,067	1,099	1,101	1,102	1,126	1,170	1,245	1,300	1,391	1,458	1,683
Progressive Democrats	Senator John Dardis*	9.11	970	979	980	981	999	1,019	1,029	1,116	1,154	1,247	1,344
Fianna Fáil	John O'Neill*	8.81	938	962	968	972	980	1,002	1,004	1,063	1,213	1,349	1,423
Labour	Jim Keane*	7.96	847	860	860	860	927	954	970	1,004	1,055	1,090	1,274
Fine Gael	Michael Nolan, Snr*	6.84	728	730	731	731	744	759	795	860	880	1,072	1,112
Independent	Francis Browne*	6.13	653	673	673	674	681	694	718	763	944	1,006	
Fianna Fáil	Breda Connolly	5.48	583	609	610	611	617	626	673	699			
Independent	Seamus Finn	5.35	569	571	573	574	592	615	619	726	737		
Independent	Murty Aspell	4.79	510	515	519	519	536	553	553				
Fine Gael	Allan Foxe	2.07	220	224	224	224	228	229					
Labour	Tom Ennis	1.84	206	208	208	208							
Independent	Percy Podger	1.00	196	204	212	213	217						
Independent	Harry Price	0.27	29	29									
Electorate: 25,040 Valid: 10,745 (42.51%) Spoilt: 126 Quota: 1,521 Turnout: 10,871 (43.02%)

=== Leixlip ===
Leixlip - 4 seats
Party	Candidate	FPv%	Count			
Party	Candidate	FPv%	1	2	3	4
Fianna Fáil	Paul Kelly	21.53	1,437			
Labour	Catherine Murphy*	19.24	1,284	1,311	1,366	
Labour	John McGinley*	16.54	1,104	1,107	1,158	1,355
Fine Gael	Senan Griffin*	15.33	1,023	1,029	1,110	1,257
Labour	Colm Purcell*	13.81	922	937	965	1,091
Green	Leo Armstrong	8.25	551	555	626	
Fianna Fáil	Laura Canning	5.30	354	400		
Electorate: 16,315 Valid: 6,675 (40.91%) Spoilt: 75 Quota: 1,336 Turnout: 6,750 (41.37%)

=== Naas ===
Naas - 5 seats
Party	Candidate	FPv%	Count										
Party	Candidate	FPv%	1	2	3	4	5	6	7	8	9	10	11
Independent	Anthony Lawlor*	16.32	1,209	1,323	1,333	1,358	1,414	1,473	1,575				
Fianna Fáil	Seán Power TD	11.85	1,061	1,135	1,146	1,171	1,223	1,280	1,338	1,346	1,828		
Fine Gael	Billy Hillis	10.12	906	912	916	943	949	1,239	1,298	1,309	1,340	1,368	1,371
Independent	Mary Glennon	11.85	875	1,180	1,228	1,284	1,363	1,517					
Progressive Democrats	Timmy Conway*	7.99	715	724	735	775	848	905	977	991	1,171	1,278	1,283
Fianna Fáil	Willie Callaghan	7.94	711	767	771	800	870	910	945	950			
Labour	Paddy McNamara	7.64	684	699	705	727	752	777					
Fine Gael	Pat O'Reilly	6.65	595	600	606	614	664						
Green	J.J. Power*	6.64	594	617	634	794	841	864	1,042	1,064	1,147	1,213	1,230
Independent	Seamus Moore	5.62	462	468	474	483							
Green	Louise Burchall	4.41	395	403	410								
Independent	Anthony Egan	4.41	395	397									
Fianna Fáil	Liam Kelly	3.98	356										
Electorate: 22,432 Valid: 8,950 (39.90%) Spoilt: 102 Quota: 1,492 Turnout: 9,052 (40.35%)
