= 1991 Kildare County Council election =

Part of the 1991 Irish local elections

← 1985	27 June 1991	1999 →

All 25 seats on Kildare County Council
	First party	Second party	Third party
Party	Fianna Fáil	Fine Gael	Labour
Seats won	8	7	3
Seat change	-2	0	-2
	Fourth party	Fifth party	Sixth party
Party	Progressive Democrats	Workers' Party	Green
Seats won	2	1	1
Seat change	+2	0	+1
	Seventh party	Eighth party
Party	Sinn Féin	Independent
Seats won	1	2
Seat change	0	+1
- Map showing the area of Kildare County Council
Council control after election
TBD

An election to Kildare County Council took place on 27 June 1991 as part of that year's Irish local elections. 25 councillors were elected from six local electoral areas (LEAs) for a five-year term of office on the electoral system of proportional representation by means of the single transferable vote (PR-STV). This term was extended twice, first to 1998, then to 1999.

== Results by party ==
Party	Seats	±	First Pref. votes	FPv%	±%
Fianna Fáil	8	-2	13,485	33.43	
Fine Gael	7	0	8,413	20.86	
Labour	3	-2	7,142	17.71	
Progressive Democrats	2	+2	2,780	6.89	
Workers' Party	1	0	1,556	3.86	
Green	1	+1	1,492	3.70	
Sinn Féin	1	0	843	2.09	
Independent	2	+1	4,718	11.70	
Totals	25	-	40,335	100.00	—

== Results by local electoral area ==
=== Athy ===
Athy - 4 seats
Party	Candidate	FPv%	Count								
Party	Candidate	FPv%	1	2	3	4	5	6	7	8	9
Independent	Joseph Bermingham*	19.3%	1,291	1,336	1,376						
Fianna Fáil	Martin Miley*	19.3%	932	943	1,027	1,050	1,058	1,277	1,356		
Sinn Féin	Paddy Wright*	12.6%	843	879	890	910	916	1,007	1,168	1,176	1,313
Fine Gael	Rainsford Hendy	10.5%	705	720	727	852	854	870	922	925	1,192
Labour	John Keating	8.2%	548	575	585	637	639	661			
Fine Gael	Sean Cunnane	7.8%	520	533	556	590	594	679	756	759	
Fianna Fáil	Eamon Kane	7.5%	503	505	561	641	648	716	771	776	836
Fianna Fáil	Frank Taaffe	7.5%	502	515	549	563	565				
Progressive Democrats	David Cope	5.4%	364	377	400						
Fianna Fáil	Michael Behan	4.3%	288	293							
Green	Ronnie Cullen	2.1%	141								
Workers' Party	Eugene Little	0.8%	51								
Electorate: 12,209 Valid: 6,688 (54.78%) Spoilt: 73 Quota: 1,338 Turnout: 6,761 (55.38%)

=== Celbridge ===
Celbridge - 5 seats
Party	Candidate	FPv%	Count											
Party	Candidate	FPv%	1	2	3	4	5	6	7	8	9	10	11	12
Labour	Emmet Stagg TD*	15.1%	1,449	1,460	1,464	1,488	1,527	1,574	1,677					
Workers' Party	Catherine Murphy	12.9%	1,242	1,250	1,255	1,263	1,304	1,312	1,340	1,346	1,448	1,472	1,506	1,748
Labour	Colm Purcell*	10.1%	965	969	979	986	1,010	1,012	1,031	1,051	1,101	1,131	1,146	1,393
Fine Gael	Bernard Durkan TD*	9.6%	923	928	1,024	1,058	1,074	1,258	1,331	1,352	1,429	1,499	1,587	1,745
Fianna Fáil	Gerry Brady*	8.5%	817	824	827	854	861	869	894	899	932	1,162	1,607	
Labour	John McGinley	8.3%	799	813	814	853	873	875	888	897	931	936	948	981
Independent	Finbarr Kelly	6.1%	588	598	611	624	649	654	680	682	847	861	881	
Fianna Fáil	Mairead Byrne	5.1%	488	488	489	491	504	522	575	585	592	735		
Fianna Fáil	Tim Cotter	5%	480	482	488	488	494	516	546	548	573			
Independent	John Colgan	4.7%	447	450	462	475	505	512	539	541				
Progressive Democrats	Mairín Hyland	3.9%	372	376	383	386	408	443						
Fine Gael	Catherine McGarry	3.3%	314	314	343	343	350							
Green	Catherine Power	2.6%	248	251	254	263								
Fine Gael	Gerard Gallery	2%	193	194										
Independent	Fred Leavy	1.7%	163	197	198									
Independent	Sean Horan	1.1%	107											
Electorate: 20,088 Valid: 9,595 (44.92) Spoilt: 47 Quota: 1,600 Turnout: 9,642 (48%)

=== Clane ===
Clane - 4 seats
Party	Candidate	FPv%	Count					
Party	Candidate	FPv%	1	2	3	4	5	6
Fine Gael	Sean Reilly*	20.8%	1,376					
Fianna Fáil	Michael Fitzpatrick	14.1%	935	939	973	992		
Fianna Fáil	P.J. Sheridan	14%	926	935	984	1,020	1,296	1,370
Fine Gael	Jim Reilly*	13.3%	879	907	1,014	1,073	1,194	1,198
Fianna Fáil	Liam Doyle*	11.9%	788	790	862	1,020	1,406	
Labour	Michael McCormack	9.8%	647	648	715	1,034	1,130	1,135
Labour	Rose Murphy	8.8%	584	588	673			
Progressive Democrats	Noel Lyons	4%	262	265				
Green	Daragh Davernport	1.7%	112	113				
Green	Deirdre O'Sullivan	1.6%	105	106				
Electorate: 12,455 Valid: 6,614 (53.1%) Spoilt: 62 Quota: 1,323 Turnout: 6,676 (53.6%)

=== Kildare ===
Kildare - 5 seats
Party	Candidate	FPv%	Count							
Party	Candidate	FPv%	1	2	3	4	5	6	7	8
Fianna Fáil	Seán Ó Fearghail*	14.2%	1,012	1,021	1,034	1,050	1,122	1,149	1,211	
Progressive Democrats	John Dardis	11.7%	835	873	913	954	999	1,037	1,071	1,137
Fianna Fáil	Jimmy O'Loughlin*	11%	786	791	838	889	912	924	938	1,176
Fine Gael	Michael McWey*	10.5%	751	757	771	854	884	1,036	1,094	1,179
Labour	Jim Keane	9.3%	665	689	702	710	777	808	1,076	1,127
Fianna Fáil	Paddy Aspell*	9%	643	658	681	682	801	809	823	918
Fianna Fáil	Denis Mahon	7.9%	566	574	580	581	608	749	757	
Labour	Mary Kavanagh	5.8%	414	440	453	460	478	503		
Fine Gael	Con Carr	5.7%	408	419	420	455	463			
Fianna Fáil	Angela Doyle	5.7%	406	427	434	435				
Fine Gael	John Joe Murphy	3.2%	230	235	258					
Independent	Harry Price	3.1%	221	232						
Green	Olive Brady	2.7%	193							
Electorate: 14,895 Valid: 7,130 (47.87%) Spoilt: 61 Quota: 1,189 Turnout: 7,191 (48.28%)

=== Naas ===
Naas - 7 seats
Party	Candidate	FPv%	Count													
Party	Candidate	FPv%	1	2	3	4	5	6	7	8	9	10	11	12	13	14
Fianna Fáil	Paddy Power*	11%	1,146	1,150	1,156	1,163	1,209	1,221	1,235	1,253	1,420					
Independent	Patsy Lawlor*	11%	1,145	1,150	1,164	1,171	1,217	1,229	1,265	1,292	1,360					
Fianna Fáil	John O'Neill*	9.4%	977	986	986	1,020	1,036	1,039	1,053	1,079	1,109	1,153	1,254	1,269	1,273	1,302
Progressive Democrats	Timmy Conway*	9.1%	947	950	962	965	973	997	1,009	1,031	1,074	1,083	1,152	1,227	1,239	1,341
Fine Gael	Mary French	7.7%	800	803	809	811	819	822	833	837	852	853	886	1,078	1,089	1,144
Fine Gael	Michael Nolan, Snr*	6.9%	717	725	725	750	753	757	780	811	816	816	942	1,081	1,083	1,130
Fianna Fáil	Paddy Behan*	6.1%	630	631	639	639	684	696	704	710	786	845	862	882	891	935
Fine Gael	Billy Hillis*	5.7%	597	599	602	603	605	669	674	683	689	690	703			
Green	Sean English	4.8%	504	510	612	626	630	643	685	707	738	741	824	899	904	1,103
Independent	Colm Feeney	4.6%	480	486	496	541	541	542	569	610	612	612				
Labour	Norman Croke	4.5%	465	468	471	478	485	545	581	760	780	783	828	846	852	
Fianna Fáil	Mary Robinson	4.3%	444	444	453	454	475	479	489	497						
Labour	Simon Donohoe	3%	317	324	326	333	333	395	439							
Labour	Tom Geoghegan	2.8%	289	290	294	295	297									
Workers' Party	Mary Larkin	2.5%	263	272	277	302	304	318								
Fianna Fáil	Andy Kelly	2.1%	216	217	217	219										
Green	Peter Sweetman	1.8%	189	193												
Independent	Dan O'Sullivan	1.7%	175	196	203											
Independent	Peter Kennedy	1%	101													
Electorate: 24,361 Valid: 10,394 (42.67%) Spoilt: 83 Quota: 1,300 Turnout: 10,477 (43.01%)
