= 1925 Irish local elections =

Nationwide local authority elections

- 23 June 1925

All councillors across the Irish Free State
	First party	Second party	Third party
Party	Cumann na nGaedheal	Republican	Labour

The 1925 Irish local elections were the first local elections following the establishment of the Irish Free State. The Local Government Act 1925 had abolished rural district councils, passing their powers to Ireland's various county councils.

== Background ==
Elections did not take place in all councils, with a number of councils being dissolved by W. T. Cosgraves Cumann na nGaedheal government in 1923 and 1924, either due to being controlled by anti-Treaty politicians during the Irish Civil War, or because of alleged financial mismanagement. These councils instead were run by appointed commissioners.

Dissolved councils included:

- Cork Corporation
- Dublin Corporation
- Leitrim County Council
- Kerry County Council
- Offaly County Council
- Cobh Urban District Council
- Tipperary Urban District Council
- Dublin District Guardians
- Roscommon Town Commissioners

== Detailed results ==
=== County Councils ===
Authority	CnaG	Rep	Lab	Ind.	Other	Total	Result	Details
Carlow								Details
Cavan								Details
Clare								Details
Cork								Details
Donegal								Details
Dublin County								Details
Fingal								Details
Galway								Details
Kerry	DISSOLVED							
Kildare	0	1	13	1	14	29	No overall control	Details
Kilkenny								Details
Laois								Details
Leitrim	DISSOLVED							
Limerick								Details
Longford								Details
Louth								Details
Mayo								Details
Meath								Details
Monaghan								Details
Offaly	DISSOLVED							
Roscommon								Details
Sligo								Details
North Tipperary								Details
South Tipperary								Details
Waterford								Details
Westmeath								Details
Wexford								Details
Wicklow								Details
Totals						1,806		

=== Borough Councils ===
Authority	CnaG	Rep	Lab	Ind.	Other	Total	Result	Details
Cork	DISSOLVED							
Dublin	DISSOLVED							
Galway								Details
Limerick						40		Details
Sligo	0	6	5	13	0	24	Independent	Details
Waterford								Details
Totals								
