= 2024 Kildare County Council election =

Part of the 2024 Irish local elections

- 7 June 2024

All 40 seats on Kildare County Council 21 seats needed for a majority
	First party	Second party	Third party
Party	Fianna Fáil	Fine Gael	Labour
Last election	12	11	5
	Fourth party	Fifth party	Sixth party
Party	Social Democrats	Green	Sinn Féin
Last election	4	3	1
	Seventh party
Party	Independent
Last election	1
- Area of Kildare County Council

An election to all 40 seats on Kildare County Council was held on 7 June 2024 as part of the 2024 Irish local elections. County Kildare is divided into 8 local electoral areas (LEAs) to elect councillors for a five-year term of office on the electoral system of proportional representation by means of the single transferable vote (PR-STV).

== Results by party ==
Party	Candidates	Seats	±	1st pref	FPv%	±%
Fianna Fáil	14	12	Steady	16,136	21.40	▼4.27
Fine Gael	15	11	Steady	21,196	28.11	▲3.39
Social Democrats	8	7	▲3	10,070	13.35	▲6.65
Labour	8	5	Steady	7,245	9.61	▼3.18
Sinn Féin	14	1	Steady	6,686	8.87	▲4.41
Independent Ireland	5	1	New	3,037	4.03	New
Green	7	0	▼3	2,556	3.39	▼3.82
Aontú	2	0	Steady	1,157	1.53	▲0.60
The Irish People	2	0	New	1,015	1.35	New
Irish Freedom	1	0	New	339	0.45	New
Independent	14	3	▼1	5,980	7.93	▼8.86
Total	90	40	Steady	75,417	100.00	Steady

== Retiring incumbents ==
The following councillors did not seek re-election:

Constituency	Councillor	Party
Celbridge	Michael Coleman	Fianna Fáil
Celbridge	Vanessa Liston	Independent
Celbridge	Ciara Galvin	Labour
Celbridge	Íde Cussen	Independent
Kildare	Anne Connolly	Fianna Fáil
Newbridge	Fiona McLoughlin Healy	Independent
Clane	Brendan Weld	Fine Gael

== Results by local electoral area ==
*: Outgoing councillor elected in 2019.
†: Outgoing councillor coopted subsequent to the 2024 election.

=== Athy ===
Athy: 5 Seats
Party	Candidate	FPv%	Count									
Party	Candidate	FPv%	1	2	3	4	5	6	7	8	9	10
Labour	Aoife Breslin	23.60%	2,347									
Fine Gael	Ivan Keatley	16.47%	1,638	1,665								
Fianna Fáil	Brian Dooley	10.82%	1,076	1,189	1,189	1,191	1,283	1,293	1,402	1,418	1,449	1,526
Fianna Fáil	Veralouise Behan	9.72%	967	1,022	1,025	1,026	1,159	1,170	1,256	1,285	1,376	1,474
Independent Ireland	William Carton	9.08%	903	930	947	947	961	1,189	1,202	1,221	1,250	1,401
Labour	Mark Leigh	7.36%	732	1,057	1,061	1,063	1,077	1,081	1,148	1,196	1,317	1,586
Sinn Féin	Thomas Redmond	5.40%	537	578	583	583	587	598	620	854	926	
Sinn Féin	Geraldine Campbell	3.62%	360	386	390	390	392	404	413			
Social Democrats	Rachael Wall	3.55%	353	369	377	377	387	398	419	442		
Irish Freedom	Anthony Casey	3.41%	339	345	348	348	351					
Fianna Fáil	David Owens	3.30%	328	342	342	343						
Fine Gael	Brian Kenny	3.21%	319	356	357	358	393	398				
Independent	Nicola Maughan	0.45%	45	47								
Electorate: 21,249 Valid: 9,944 Spoilt: 122 Quota: 1,658 Turnout: 10,066 (47.37%)

=== Celbridge ===
Celbridge: 4 Seats
Party	Candidate	FPv%	Count						
Party	Candidate	FPv%	1	2	3	4	5	6	7
Fianna Fáil	David Trost	24.54%	1,687						
Social Democrats	Claire O’Rourke	20.54%	1,412						
Fine Gael	Lumi Panaite Fahey	17.76%	1,221	1,375	1,383				
Labour	Rupert Heather	9.77%	672	740	749	968	973	1,148	1,253
Sinn Féin	David Monaghan	8.63%	593	607	613	650	650	737	839
The Irish People	Darragh Toner	7.07%	486	500	501	517	519	590	
Independent	Zhyan Phelan	6.04%	415	442	448	514	516		
Green	Peter Paul Hughes	5.66%	389	423	429				
Electorate: 16,662 Valid: 6,875 Spoilt: 81 Quota: 1,376 Turnout: 6,956 (41.75%)

=== Clane ===
Clane: 5 Seats
Party	Candidate	FPv%	Count								
Party	Candidate	FPv%	1	2	3	4	5	6	7	8	9
Fine Gael	Brendan Wyse	21.54%	1,986								
Independent	Pádraig McEvoy	14.50%	1,337	1,355	1,370	1,380	1,401	1,415	1,502	1,647	
Social Democrats	Aidan Farrelly†	14.10%	1,300	1,343	1,381	1,385	1,468	1,489	1,497	1,562	
Fine Gael	William Durkan	11.40%	1,051	1,229	1,254	1,257	1,300	1,309	1,319	1,365	1,438
Fianna Fáil	Darragh Fitzpatrick	10.99%	1,013	1,111	1,120	1,121	1,142	1,166	1,178	1,221	1,272
Sinn Féin	Killian Brennan	7.51%	692	729	731	733	750	919	936	981	1,078
Independent Ireland	Ryan McKeown	5.07%	467	478	482	503	508	520	596	683	
Aontú	Una O'Connor	5.04%	465	480	485	497	502	514	532		
Sinn Féin	Mick Tuohy	2.60%	240	261	266	269	278				
Labour	Eoin Coates	2.16%	199	209	234	234					
Independent	Sophie Roker	1.84%	170	176	180	284	290	293			
Independent	Jessica McLoughlin	1.75%	161	167	171						
Green	Patricia Foley	1.50%	138	144							
Electorate: 20,665 Valid: 9,219 Spoilt: 103 Quota: 1,537 Turnout: 9,322 (45.11%)

=== Kildare ===
Kildare: 5 Seats
Party	Candidate	FPv%	Count								
Party	Candidate	FPv%	1	2	3	4	5	6	7	8	9
Fianna Fáil	Suzanne Doyle	20.12%	1,667								
Fine Gael	Kevin Duffy	17.61%	1,459								
Fianna Fáil	Brian O'Loughlin	13.78%	1,142	1,246	1,253	1,261	1,313	1,349	1,368	1,394	
Fine Gael	Paddy Curran	8.94%	741	816	834	842	893	944	963	985	1,046
Social Democrats	Pat Balfe	7.34%	608	625	640	653	729	854	882	928	1,061
Sinn Féin	Shónagh Ní Raghallaigh††	7.23%	599	616	618	637	660	684	730	1,066	1,189
Independent	Declan Crowe	5.71%	473	492	494	559	571	594	798	823	
Sinn Féin	Noel Connolly	5.13%	425	433	437	446	455	495	515		
Independent Ireland	Paul O'Malley	4.56%	368	373	374	422	433	457			
Labour	Chris Harrison	3.85%	319	331	352	363	399				
Green	Lorraine Benson	3.34%	277	298	300	305					
Independent	Aisling Goodwin	1.50%	124	129	132						
Independent	Denis Delaney	1.01%	84	86	87						
Electorate: 19,042 Valid: 8,286 Spoilt: 136 Quota: 1,382 Turnout: 8,422 (44.23%)

=== Leixlip ===
Leixlip: 3 Seats
Party	Candidate	FPv%	Count	
Party	Candidate	FPv%	1	2
Fine Gael	Joe Neville†††	37.76%	2,293	
Social Democrats	Nuala Killeen	29.10%	1,767	
Fianna Fáil	Bernard Caldwell	20.29%	1,232	1,818
Sinn Féin	Joan O’Boyle	9.65%	586	649
Green	Imran Ali	3.19%	194	319
Electorate: 14,011 Valid: 6,072 Spoilt: 149 Quota: 1,519 Turnout: 6,221 (44.4%)

=== Maynooth ===
Maynooth: 5 Seats
Party	Candidate	FPv%	Count						
Party	Candidate	FPv%	1	2	3	4	5	6	7
Fianna Fáil	Naoise Ó Cearúil††††	20.02%	1,880						
Fine Gael	Tim Durkan	15.41%	1,447	1,494	1,586				
Labour	Angela Feeney	13.28%	1,247	1,351	1,478	1,484	1,551	1,678	
Social Democrats	Peter Melrose	12.72%	1,195	1,243	1,429	1,433	1,517	1,771	
Fianna Fáil	Paul Ward	11.66%	1,095	1,173	1,197	1,200	1,251	1,298	1,347
Fine Gael	Tara Lane	10.14%	952	961	987	993	1,022	1,062	1,102
Sinn Féin	Evelyn Gaynor	5.78%	543	548	566	566	605		
Independent Ireland	Liam Meade	5.69%	534	541	551	552			
Green	Peter Hamilton	5.30%	498	514					
Electorate: 20,869 Valid: 9,391 Spoilt: 89 Quota: 1,566 Turnout: 9,480 (45.43%)

=== Naas ===
Naas: 7 Seats
Party	Candidate	FPv%	Count											
Party	Candidate	FPv%	1	2	3	4	5	6	7	8	9	10	11	12
Social Democrats	Bill Clear	14.20%	1,975											
Fine Gael	Fintan Brett	12.36%	1,719	1,735	1,741									
Fine Gael	Evie Sammon	10.57%	1,470	1,490	1,494	1,502	1,517	1,531	1,904					
Independent	Seamie Moore	9.24%	1,285	1,312	1,316	1,416	1,426	1,502	1,541	1,557	1,669	1,791		
Fianna Fáil	Carmel Kelly	8.43%	1,173	1,192	1,192	1,196	1,221	1,227	1,357	1,403	1,440	1,600	1,669	1,689
Labour	Anne Breen	7.98%	1,110	1,148	1,153	1,156	1,182	1,196	1,278	1,313	1,467	1,868		
Fianna Fáil	Brian Larkin	7.14%	993	1,006	1,011	1,022	1,026	1,034	1,084	1,110	1,133	1,264	1,298	1,310
Green	Bob Quinn	6.26%	871	911	917	918	932	948	1,019	1,054	1,121			
Fine Gael	Ciara Dunne	5.75%	800	821	827	830	845	857						
Independent Ireland	Ger Dunne	5.43%	755	764	768	803	813	1,114	1,154	1,160	1,275	1,324	1,350	1,370
Sinn Féin	Caroline Hogan	3.98%	554	569	654	658	838	862	880	881				
The Irish People	Avril Corcoran	3.80%	529	533	536	554	560							
Sinn Féin	Evangeline Ngozi Omini	1.88%	262	270	336	340								
Independent	Hugo Magee	1.52%	211	215	219									
Sinn Féin	Pauline O'Neill	1.45%	201	203										
Electorate: 30,143 Valid: 13,908 Spoilt: 138 Quota: 1,739 Turnout: 14,046 (46.60%)

=== Newbridge ===
Newbridge: 6 Seats
Party	Candidate	FPv%	Count										
Party	Candidate	FPv%	1	2	3	4	5	6	7	8	9	10	11
Fine Gael	Tracey O'Dwyer	17.90%	2,084										
Fine Gael	Peggy O'Dwyer	17.31%	2,016										
Social Democrats	Chris Pender	12.54%	1,460	1,509	1,571	1,588	1,644	1,688					
Fianna Fáil	Noel Heavey	8.97%	1,044	1,104	1,186	1,192	1,222	1,238	1,247	1,328	1,480	1,482	1,662
Fianna Fáil	Robert Power	7.20%	839	967	1,042	1,048	1,080	1,090	1,096	1,191	1,327	1,328	1,437
Aontú	Melissa Byrne	5.94%	692	756	779	793	818	850	877	965	1,097	1,098	
Sinn Féin	James Stokes	5.53%	644	664	675	679	683	908	935	981	1,084	1,100	1,256
Labour	Aina Conway	5.32%	619	654	685	686	720	744	750	828			
Independent	Tom McDonnell (Note: Three members of Éire Saor, a minor and unregistered far-right party, ran as independent candidates in the Newbridge LEA.)	4.71%	548	557	565	613	613	623	987	1,128	1,160	1,159	1,419
Independent	James Garvin	4.29%	500	515	542	564	572	580	616				
Independent	Chris McCormack	3.95%	460	465	468	507	511	518					
Sinn Féin	Terri Thorpe	3.29%	383	390	397	402	409						
Green	Ronan Maher	1.62%	189	209	225	228							
Independent	Leanne O'Neill	1.43%	167	175	182								
Electorate: 25,116 Valid: 11,645 Spoilt: 110 Quota: 1,664 Turnout: 11,755 (46.80%)

== Changes ==
=== Co-options ===
Party	Outgoing	LEA	Reason	Date	Co-optee
Social Democrats	Aidan Farrelly	Clane	Elected to 34th Dáil at the 2024 general election	19 December 2024	Paula Mulroe
Fine Gael	Joe Neville	Leixlip	Elected to 34th Dáil at the 2024 general election	19 December 2024	Paul Brooks
Sinn Féin	Shónagh Ní Raghallaigh	Kildare	Elected to 34th Dáil at the 2024 general election	19 December 2024	Noel Connolly
Fianna Fáil	Naoise Ó Cearúil	Maynooth	Elected to 34th Dáil at the 2024 general election	19 December 2024	Donna Phelan
Fine Gael	Lumi Panaite Fahey	Celbridge	Resignation	25 November 2025	Declan Ryan

=== Changes in affiliation ===
Name	LEA	Elected as	New affiliation	Date
Bill Clear	Naas	Social Democrats	Independent	September 2024
Bill Clear	Naas	Independent	Independent Ireland	6 November 2025
Pat Balfe	Kildare	Social Democrats	Independent	27 February 2026
Pat Balfe	Kildare	Independent	Labour	2 October 2026
