= 1899 Kildare County Council election =

Local election in Ireland

Map of the results of the election. Green: Nationalist. Blue: Unionist. Grey: Independent.

An election for Kildare County Council was held in 1899 as part of the wider 1899 Irish local elections. It was the first election following the reorganization of Irish local government caused by the Local Government (Ireland) Act 1898, and saw a considerable change of power from the largely Protestant traditional landowning class to the largely Catholic tenants.

The council was composed of 30 members, of whom 21 were elected representatives, whilst the remaining nine were Ex officio members; 5 were members by virtue of being Chairmen of Rural district councils, whilst 3 were nominees of the grand jury.

In contrast to County Mayo, the United Irish League played no role in the election, and didn't have any Kildare branches until December 1899. Whilst many candidates proclaimed themselves as nationalists, they were moderates, with no candidates advocating Irish republican sentiments.

== Aggregate results ==
Kildare County Council election, 1899
Party	Seats	Gains	Losses	Net gain/loss	Seats %	Votes %	Votes	+/−
Ind. Nationalist	17				80.95	72.94	4,100	
Ind. Unionist	3				14.29	21.37	1,201	
Independent	1				4.76	5.69	320	

== Ward results ==
Athy
Party	Candidate	Votes	%	±%
Ind. Nationalist	Matthew Minch	Unopposed	N/A	N/A
Ind. Nationalist win (new seat)				

Ballytore
Party	Candidate	Votes	%	±%
Ind. Nationalist	Owen Cogan	330		
Ind. Unionist	Thomas Greene	30		
Majority				
Turnout				
Ind. Nationalist hold		Swing		

Ballymore-Eustace
Party	Candidate	Votes	%	±%
Ind. Nationalist	George Wolfe	381	84.7	
Ind. Unionist	Baron de Robeck	69	15.3	
Majority		312	69.4	
Turnout		450		
Ind. Nationalist win (new seat)				

Carbury
Party	Candidate	Votes	%	±%
Ind. Unionist	More O’Ferrall	219		
Ind. Nationalist	Charles Burke	146		
Ind. Nationalist	William Smith	49		
Majority				
Turnout				
Ind. Unionist hold		Swing		

Castledermot
Party	Candidate	Votes	%	±%
Ind. Nationalist	Edward Hayden	328		
Ind. Unionist	Thomas Greene	32		
Ind. Nationalist	Charles John Engledow	Disqualified		
Majority				
Turnout				
Ind. Nationalist hold		Swing		

Celbridge
Party	Candidate	Votes	%	±%
Ind. Unionist	Sir Gerald Dease	Unopposed		
Majority				
Turnout				
Ind. Unionist hold		Swing		

Churchtown
Party	Candidate	Votes	%	±%
Ind. Nationalist	Stephen Hayden	Unopposed		
Majority				
Turnout				
Ind. Nationalist hold		Swing		

Clane
Party	Candidate	Votes	%	±%
Ind. Nationalist	Peter Crosbie	230		
Ind. Unionist	T. Cooke-Trench	127		
Majority				
Turnout				
Ind. Nationalist hold		Swing		

Harristown
Party	Candidate	Votes	%	±%
Ind. Nationalist	James Kelly	Unopposed		
Majority				
Turnout				
Ind. Nationalist hold		Swing		

Kilcock
Party	Candidate	Votes	%	±%
Ind. Nationalist	John Field	286		
Ind. Nationalist	James Cummins	80		
Majority				
Turnout				
Ind. Nationalist hold		Swing		

Kilcullen
Party	Candidate	Votes	%	±%
Ind. Nationalist	Edward Fenelon	334		
Ind. Unionist	C. Cramer-Roberts	101		
Majority				
Turnout				
Ind. Nationalist hold		Swing		

Kildare
Party	Candidate	Votes	%	±%
Ind. Nationalist	Charles Bergin	243		
Ind. Nationalist	John Moore	182		
Majority				
Turnout				
Ind. Nationalist hold		Swing		

Kilmeague
Party	Candidate	Votes	%	±%
Ind. Nationalist	John Cribben	247		
Ind. Nationalist	Edward Delaney	41		
Majority				
Turnout				
Ind. Nationalist hold		Swing		

Kilteel
Party	Candidate	Votes	%	±%
Ind. Nationalist	Laurence Malone	222		
Ind. Unionist	T. H. Campion	183		
Ind. Unionist	Earl of Mayo	19		
Majority				
Turnout				
Ind. Nationalist hold		Swing		

Maynooth
Party	Candidate	Votes	%	±%
Ind. Unionist	Lord Frederick Fitzgerald	235	59.0	
Ind. Nationalist	William Rutherford	163	40.9	
Majority		72	18.1	
Turnout		398		
Ind. Unionist win (new seat)				

Monasterevin
Party	Candidate	Votes	%	±%
Ind. Nationalist	Edward J. Cassidy	247		
Ind. Nationalist	M. Dowling	208		
Majority				
Turnout				
Ind. Nationalist hold		Swing		

Morristown-Biller
Party	Candidate	Votes	%	±%
Ind. Nationalist	James Kelly	210		
Ind. Nationalist	Gerald Hurley	173		
Ind. Unionist	William Pallin	20		
Majority				
Turnout				
Ind. Nationalist hold		Swing		

Naas
Party	Candidate	Votes	%	±%
Independent	Stephen J. Brown	320		
Ind. Unionist	Thomas. J. de Burgh	166		
Majority				
Turnout				
Independent hold		Swing		

Newbridge
Party	Candidate	Votes	%	±%
Ind. Nationalist	Joseph P. Dowling	Unopposed		
Majority				
Turnout				
Ind. Nationalist hold		Swing		

Rathangan
Party	Candidate	Votes	%	±%
Ind. Nationalist	Stephen Murphy	Unopposed		
Majority				
Turnout				
Ind. Nationalist hold		Swing		

Timahoe
Party	Candidate	Votes	%	±%
Ind. Nationalist	Francis Colgan JP	Unopposed		
Majority				
Turnout				
Ind. Nationalist hold		Swing		
