= 1920 Kildare County Council election =

Local election in Ireland

- 4 June 1920

All 21 seats to Kildare County Council 11 seats needed for a majority
	First party	Second party	Third party
Party	Sinn Féin	Labour	Independent
Seats won	15	5	1
Council control after election
Sinn Féin

The 1920 Kildare County Council election was held on Friday, 4 June 1920.

== Results by party ==
Party	Seats	±	First Pref. votes	FPv%	±%
Sinn Féin	15		4,637	53.96	
Labour	5		2,405	27.99	
Independent	1		1,551	18.05	
Totals	21		8,593	100.00	—

== Results by local electoral area ==
=== Athy ===
Athy - 4 seats
Party	Candidate	FPv%	Count
Party	Candidate	FPv%	1
Labour	C. J. Supple		504
Sinn Féin	W. Mahon		312
Sinn Féin	Patrick Dooley		205
Sinn Féin	George Harbourne		177
Independent	James Flynn		125
Labour	M. Tomlinson		120
Sinn Féin	W. Murray*		115
Sinn Féin	J. J. Kehoe		103
Independent	R. Wright*		94
Independent	John Conlan*		84
Independent	Thomas Hickey*		23
Electorate: 4,093 Valid: 1,862 Spoilt: 114 Quota: 373 Turnout: 1,976

=== Kildare ===
Kildare - 5 seats
Party	Candidate	FPv%	Count
Party	Candidate	FPv%	1
Sinn Féin	E. Moran		547
Sinn Féin	Nicholas Hanagan		415
Labour	James Cregan		368
Labour	Arthur Murphy		290
Independent	Chas. Bergin*		249
Sinn Féin	Francis Doran		224
Labour	Chr. Kenny		211
Independent	James Sunderland*		91
Electorate: 4,321 Valid: 2,395 Spoilt: 145 Quota: 400 Turnout: 2,540

=== Naas ===
Naas - 5 seats
Party	Candidate	FPv%	Count		
Party	Candidate	FPv%	1		
Sinn Féin	Daniel Buckley		754		
Sinn Féin	James O'Connor		396	486	
Sinn Féin	T. Harris		360	542	
Independent	M. Fitzsimons		301	312	313
Sinn Féin	John Lawler		210	215	228
Sinn Féin	Nicholas Travers		198	220	248
Sinn Féin	Mark Carroll		170	206	207
Labour	J. J. J. Flanagan		147	155	
Independent	E. Farrell		50	62	
Independent	T. Lacy		50	52	53 (eliminated)
Electorate: 4,741 Spoilt: 140 Quota: 440 Turnout: 2,776

=== Newbridge ===
Newbridge - 4 seats
Party	Candidate	FPv%	Count					
Party	Candidate	FPv%	1	2	3	4	5	6
Labour	Michael Smyth		508					
Sinn Féin	Thomas Doran		313	329	337	347	347	454
Sinn Féin	J. Fitzgerald		293	305	310	340	343	370
Labour	Hugh Colohan		257	361	363	376		
Independent	Henry C. Fay*		152	155	168	196-elim		
Independent	George Wolfe*		137	138	159	196	197	221
Independent	P. J. Doyle*		123	126	141-elim			
Independent	Joseph O'Connor*		72	75-elim				
Electorate: 3,626 Valid: 1,700 Spoilt: 157 Quota: 372 Turnout: 1,857

=== Clane ===
Clane - 3 seats
Party	Candidate	FPv%	%	Seat	Count
Sinn Féin	Joseph Cusack	Unopposed	N/A	1	
Sinn Féin	Richard McCann	Unopposed	N/A	2	
Sinn Féin	Patrick Phelan*	Unopposed	N/A	3	
