= 1925 Kildare County Council election =

Local election in Ireland

- 23 June 1925

All 29 seats to Kildare County Council 15 seats needed for a majority
	First party	Second party
Party	Farmers' Party	Labour
Seats won	14	13
- Map showing the area of Kildare County Council
Council control after election
No overall control

An election to Kildare County Council took place on 23 June 1925 as part of that year's Irish local elections.

== Results by party ==
Party	Seats	±	First Pref. votes	FPv%	±%
Farmers' Party	14				
Labour	13				
Republican	1				
Independent	1				
Totals	29			100%	—

== Results by Electoral Area ==
=== Athy ===
Athy - 5 seats
Party	Candidate	FPv%	Count
Party	Candidate	FPv%	1
Farmers' Party	William J. Fennell		
Labour	Thomas Corcoran		
Labour	James Foley		
Farmers' Party	John Greene		
Farmers' Party	George Henderson		
Farmers' Party	James Keegan		
Independent	Michael Malone		
Labour	C.J. Supple		
Labour	John Dunne		
Farmers' Party	James Flynn		
Labour	Patrick Foley		
