= Patrick Fell =

Patrick Fell (Irish: Pádraig Ó Fithchill; 1940 – 18 September 2011) was a Catholic priest who was convicted in the 1970s of being a commander of a Provisional Irish Republican Army (IRA) active service unit and for his part in a conspiracy to cause explosions in Coventry.

== Early life ==
Fell was born in England and was a convert to Roman Catholicism before being ordained as a priest. He was assistant priest at All Souls Church, Chapelfields, Coventry.

== Arrest and trial ==
In April 1973, Fell was arrested with six others alleged to comprise an IRA unit planning a campaign in Coventry. He was tried at Birmingham's Crown Court. The jury found three of the seven not guilty; the remaining four were all found guilty of criminal damage and conspiracy to commit arson. Fell pleaded not guilty. Fell and Frank Stagg, were accused of being the unit's commanding officers.

Stagg was given a ten-year sentence and Fell twelve years. (Stagg would later die on hunger strike.) Thomas Gerald Rush was given seven years and Anthony Roland Lynch, who was also found guilty of possessing articles with intent to destroy property, namely nitric acid, balloons, wax, and sodium chlorate, was given ten years.

== Imprisonment ==
Fell was eventually sent to the top security Albany Prison on the Isle of Wight. It was here in 1976, following an incident, he was one of six republican prisoners charged with various offences including mutiny, incitement to mutiny, and violence. Fell and the others were involved in a "sitting down" protest against the treatment of another prisoner. As a result of attempts to break up the protest, both prisoners and prison warders received personal injuries. In that incident Fell reportedly had his nose broken (which was never reset) and required stitches to his head. Fell was punished by the Prison's Board of Visitors and given 91 days solitary confinement and 570 days loss of remission.

== Release ==
Upon his release Fell served as a parish priest in rural Frosses, County Donegal.

In June 1984 he was successful in his action to find the British Government guilty of violating the European Convention on Human Rights. The Government had denied the right of legal representation to prisoners facing internal prison disciplinary charges. The ECHR ordered that "the United Kingdom is to pay to the applicants [Fell and Campbell], in respect of legal costs and expenses, the sum of thirteen thousand pounds sterling (£13,000), together with any value added tax that may be due."

He died in County Dublin on 18 September 2011.
