= Frank Stagg (Irish republican) =

Irish hunger striker (1941–1976)

- Proinsias Stagg
- Born: 5 October 1941; Hollymount, County Mayo, Ireland
- Died: 12 February 1976 (aged 34); Wakefield Prison, Wakefield, UK
- Cause of death: Hunger strike
- Organisation: Provisional IRA
- Known for: Hunger strike of 62 days, from 14 December 1975
- Relatives: Emmet Stagg (brother)

Frank Stagg (Irish: Proinsias Stagg; 5 October 1941 – 12 February 1976) was an Irish militant and Republican activist. He was a Provisional Irish Republican Army (IRA) hunger striker from County Mayo, Ireland who died in 1976 in Wakefield Prison, West Yorkshire, England after 62 days on hunger strike. Stagg was one of 22 Irish republicans to die on hunger strike in the twentieth century.

== Background ==
Frank Stagg was the seventh child in a family of thirteen children. He was born in Hollymount, County Mayo, in 1941. His father, Henry, and his uncle had both fought in the Irish War of Independence and Irish Civil War. His brother, Emmet Stagg became a Labour Party politician and a Teachta Dála (TD) for Kildare North. Stagg was educated to primary level at Newbrook Primary School and at CBS Ballinrobe to secondary level. After finishing his schooling, he worked as an assistant gamekeeper with his uncle before emigrating to England in search of work. Once in England, he gained employment as a bus conductor in North London and later became a bus driver. Whilst in England he met and married fellow Mayo native, Bridie Armstrong from Carnacon in 1970.

In 1972, he joined the Luton cumann of Sinn Féin and soon after became a volunteer in the Provisional Irish Republican Army (IRA).

== Provisional IRA ==
In April 1973, Stagg was arrested with six others alleged to comprise an IRA unit planning bombing attacks in Coventry. He was tried at Birmingham Crown Court. The jury found three of the seven not guilty; the remaining four were all found guilty of criminal damage and conspiracy to commit arson. Stagg and English-born priest, Father Patrick Fell, were found to be the unit's commanding officers; Stagg was given a ten-year sentence and Fell twelve years. Thomas Gerald Rush was given seven years and Anthony Roland Lynch, who was also found guilty of possessing articles with intent to destroy property, namely nitric acid, balloons, wax and sodium chlorate, was given ten years.

Stagg was initially sent to the top security Albany Prison on the Isle of Wight. In March 1974, having been moved to Parkhurst Prison, he and fellow Mayo man Michael Gaughan joined a hunger strike begun by the sisters Marion Price and Dolours Price, Hugh Feeney and Gerry Kelly.

Following the hunger strike that resulted in the death of Michael Gaughan, the Price sisters, Feeney and Kelly were granted repatriation to Ireland. Stagg was denied repatriation and was transferred to Long Lartin Prison. During his time there he was subject to solitary confinement for refusing to do prison work and was also subjected, along with his wife and sisters during visits, to humiliating body searches. In protest against this, he began a second hunger strike that lasted for thirty-four days. This ended when the prison governor agreed to an end to the strip-searches on Stagg and his visitors. Stagg was bed-ridden for the rest of his incarceration in Long Lartin, due to a kidney complaint.

== Hunger strike ==
In 1975 he was transferred to Wakefield Prison, where it was demanded that he again do prison work. He refused and was placed in solitary confinement. On 14 December 1975, Stagg embarked on a hunger strike in Wakefield, along with a number of other republican prisoners, after again being refused repatriation to Ireland during the IRA/British truce.

Stagg's demands were:

- An end to solitary confinement
- No prison work
- Repatriation to prison in Ireland

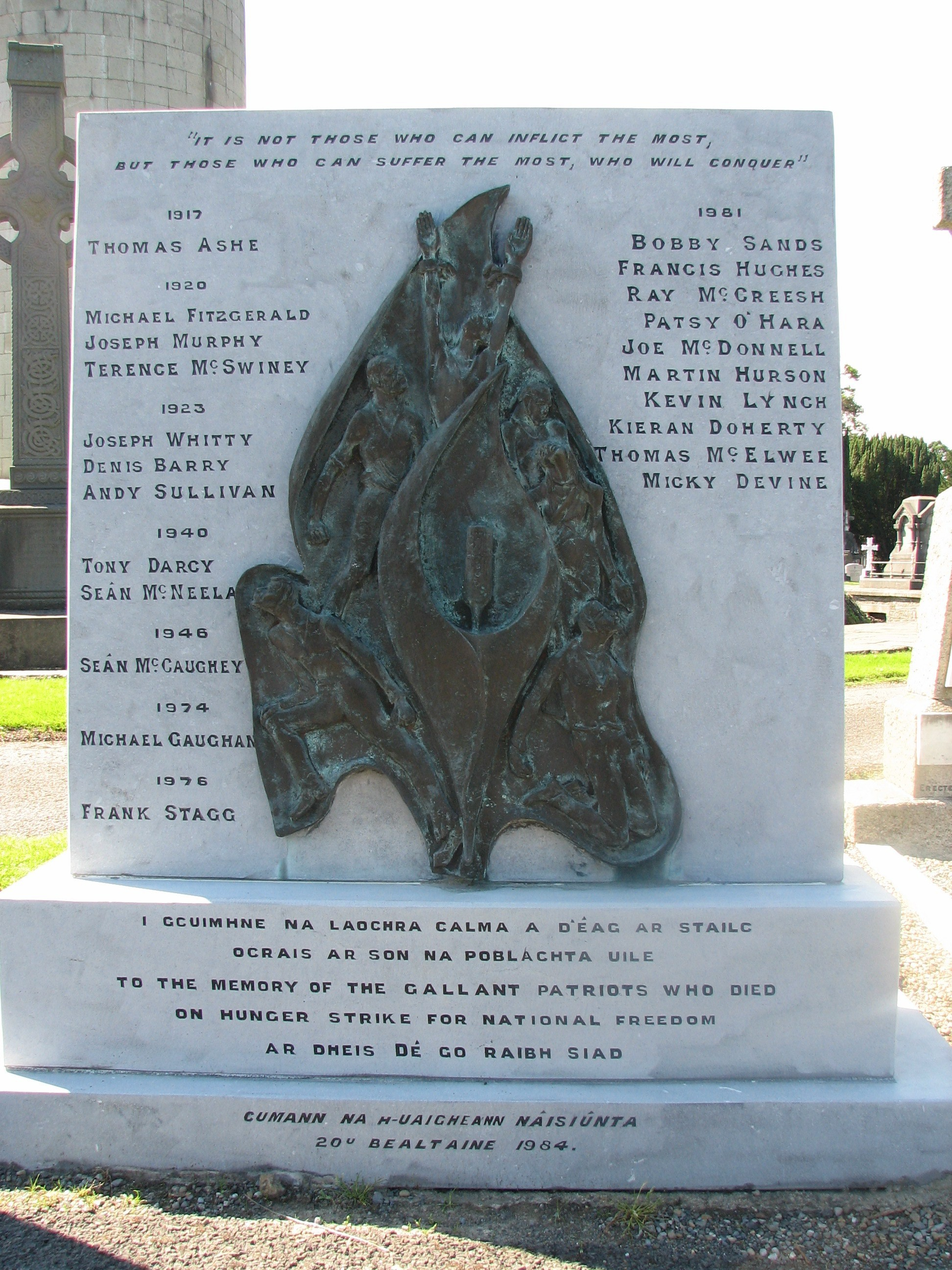
Hunger Strike Memorial in Dublin's Glasnevin Cemetery

The British government refused to meet any of these demands. Stagg died on 12 February 1976 after 62 days on hunger strike. The IRA swore revenge over his death, warning the British public it was going to attack indiscriminately.

== The three funerals of Frank Stagg ==
Frank Stagg's burial caused considerable controversy in Ireland. Republicans, his mother and two of his brothers sought to have Stagg buried in the republican plot in Ballina beside the grave of Michael Gaughan, in accordance with his wishes which he had added to his will in prison during his hunger strike. His widow, his brother Emmet Stagg and the Irish government wished to have him buried in the family plot in the same cemetery and to avoid republican involvement in the funeral.

His body was taken to the parish church in Hollymount by helicopter and buried near the family plot. This first burial was attended by thousands of Republicans while 1,600 members of the Irish Defence Forces and the Garda Síochána were deployed by the government to keep order at the funeral. Despite their presence, members of the Provisional IRA attended this first burial, firing volleys of shot over his coffin, in the style of a military funeral.

Following the first burial, a requiem mass was held in Mayo for Stagg by Republicans. Once again a mass deployment of Gardai was ordered, and once again large numbers of Republicans and Provisional IRA members attended. Joe Cahill, who had formerly been a Chief of Staff of the IRA, attended the ceremony and vowed during it that at some point in the future there would be another funeral for Stagg, with his body being laid to rest beside that of Gaughan's.

In order to prevent the body from being disinterred and reburied by republicans, the first grave had been covered with concrete. Local Gardaí kept an armed guard by the grave for six months. However, unknown to them, the plot beside this grave was available for purchase. Frank's brother George purchased the plot and placed a headstone over it, with it declaring that the "pro-British Irish government" had stolen Frank's body. 22 months later in November 1977, a group of republicans dug down into the plot that George had purchased, then dug sideways and recovered Frank's coffin from the adjacent plot under cover of darkness, before reburying it in the republican plot beside the body of Michael Gaughan under a third and final headstone. The Republicans held their own version of a funeral ceremony before disappearing back into the night. This is sometimes referred to as the third and final funeral of Frank Stagg.

Following the final burial, an anonymous letter was sent to the Taoiseach Liam Cosgrave, the Minister for Justice Patrick Cooney, the Minister for Post and Telegraphs Conor Cruise O'Brien and Minister for Foreign Affairs Garret FitzGerald, informing them each that they had been "marked out for assassination" because of their government's involvement with Stagg's burial(s). Stagg's widow Bridie and his brother Emmet were reported to have been intimidated by members of the Provisional IRA due to their opposition to his burial in a Republican plot.
