= 2004 Kildare County Council election =

Part of the 2004 Irish local elections

- 11 June 2004

All 25 seats on Kildare County Council
	First party	Second party	Third party
Party	Fianna Fáil	Fine Gael	Labour
Seats won	10	7	4
Seat change	+1	+2	-1
	Fourth party	Fifth party	Sixth party
Party	Green	Progressive Democrats	Independent
Seats won	1	0	3
Seat change	+1	-2	-1
- Map showing the area of Kildare County Council
Council control after election
TBD

An election to Kildare County Council took place on 11 June 2004 as part of that year's Irish local elections. 25 councillors were elected from six local electoral areas (LEAs) for a five-year term of office on the electoral system of proportional representation by means of the single transferable vote (PR-STV).

== Results by party ==
Party	Seats	±	First Pref. votes	FPv%	±%
Fianna Fáil	10	+1	20,653	31.47	
Fine Gael	7	+2	13,767	20.98	
Labour	4	-1	12,492	19.04	
Green	1	+1	4,015	6.12	
Progressive Democrats	0	-2	2,493	3.80	
Independent	3	-1	11,719	17.86	
Totals	25	0	65,623	100.00	—

== Results by local electoral area ==
=== Athy ===
Athy - 3 seats
Party	Candidate	FPv%	Count				
Party	Candidate	FPv%	1	2	3	4	5
Fianna Fáil	Martin Miley, Jnr*	26.52	2,146				
Fianna Fáil	Mark Dalton	16.84	1,363	1,457	1,521	1,690	1,973
Fine Gael	Rainsford Hendy*	16.37	1,325	1,359	1,383	1,441	1,900
Labour	Adrian Kane*	12.59	1,019	1,105	1,115	1,542	1,738
Fine Gael	Richard Daly	11.47	928	990	1,003	1,154	
Labour	John Lawler	10.41	842	937	948		
Green	Eddie Lawler	5.80	469				
Electorate: 15,315 Valid: 8,092 (52.84%) Spoilt: 197 Quota: 2,024 Turnout: 8,289 (54.12%)

=== Celbridge ===
Celbridge - 3 seats
Party	Candidate	FPv%	Count					
Party	Candidate	FPv%	1	2	3	4	5	6
Labour	Kevin Byrne*	33.46	2,436					
Fianna Fáil	Geraldine Conway*	13.41	976	1,068	1,166	1,232	1,600	1,840
Fine Gael	Katie Ridge	12.60	917	1,031	1,047	1,262	1,364	1,658
Progressive Democrats	John Lyons*	10.99	800	884	895	966	1,105	1,321
Fianna Fáil	Margaret Lynch	9.33	679	743	793	834		
Independent	Mairead Byrne	8.83	643	759	768	973	1,082	
Green	Marie Percival	4.06	616	741	766			
Fianna Fáil	James O'Reilly	2.93	213	233				
Electorate: 15,857 Valid: 7,280 (45.91%) Spoilt: 151 Quota: 1,821 Turnout: 7,431 (46.86%)

=== Clane ===
Clane - 4 seats
Party	Candidate	FPv%	Count				
Party	Candidate	FPv%	1	2	3	4	5
Fianna Fáil	Michael Fitzpatrick*	15.53	1,652	1,680	1,793	1,871	2,153
Independent	Tony McEvoy*	14.07	1,497	1,571	1,844	2,093	2,154
Fianna Fáil	Liam Doyle	13.49	1,435	1,483	1,550	1,741	1,829
Fianna Fáil	P.J. Sheridan*	12.97	1,380	1,398	1,444	1,526	1,591
Fine Gael	Brendan Weld	11.74	1,249	1,290	1,381	1,594	2,187
Fine Gael	Jim Reilly*	9.83	1,045	1,073	1,253	1,342	
Labour	Chris Rowland	9.28	987	1,063	1,160		
Independent	Heike Holstein	8.85	941	1,026			
Green	Leo Armstrong	3.25	346				
Independent	Seanan O Coistin	0.98	104				
Electorate: 20,905 Valid: 10,636 (50.88%) Spoilt: 200 Quota: 2,128 Turnout: 10,836 (51.83%)

=== Kildare ===
Kildare - 6 seats
Party	Candidate	FPv%	Count												
Party	Candidate	FPv%	1	2	3	4	5	6	7	8	9	10	11	12	13
Fianna Fáil	Fiona O'Loughlin*	14.88	2,333												
Fianna Fáil	Suzanne Doyle*	10.89	1,708	1,713	1,726	1,804	1,825	1,944	1,977	2,084	2,138	2,163	2,214	2,315	
Fianna Fáil	Pat Black	8.88	1,392	1,418	1,436	1,443	1,454	1,524	1,618	1,657	1,685	1,765	1,853	2,054	2,138
Fine Gael	Fionnuala Dukes*	6.83	1,071	1,087	1,093	1,147	1,343	1,362	1,397	1,472	1,523	1,550	1,788	1,959	2,243
Independent	Matthew Lonergan	6.81	1,068	1,082	1,084	1,090	1,111	1,114	1,128	1,159	1,172	1,277	1,291	1,322	
Fine Gael	Michael Nolan, Snr	6.11	959	1,000	1,006	1,012	1,033	1,069	1,119	1,140	1,190	1,284	1,490	1,652	1,699
Labour	Francis Browne	5.85	917	921	922	989	1,022	1,034	1,062	1,120	1,260	1,288	1,352	1,412	1,760
Progressive Democrats	Mick Deely*	4.77	748	782	788	795	809	885	950	989	1,043	1,106	1,206		
Fine Gael	Shane O'Dwyer	4.73	742	759	763	769	783	810	847	871	959	985			
Labour	Seamus Finn	4.51	708	742	745	788	805	822	887	934	1,065	1,230	1,274	1,408	1,461
Independent	Paddy Kennedy	3.56	559	604	608	613	638	660	758	812	833				
Independent	Murty Aspell	3.56	558	593	597	612	621	648							
Green	Ger Fitzgibbon	3.55	556	581	584	635	657	668	689						
Labour	Liam Murphy	3.48	546	554	555	621	629	698	718	764					
Fianna Fáil	Paddy Slattery	3.32	520	530	540	548	552								
Fine Gael	Leo Conway	3.05	478	480	490	497									
Labour	Mary Kavanagh	2.93	459	463	464										
Independent	Daisy Rooney	2.31	362												
Electorate: 31,046 Valid: 15,684 (50.52%) Spoilt: 359 Quota: 2,241 Turnout: 16,043 (51.67%)

=== Leixlip ===
Leixlip - 4 seats
Party	Candidate	FPv%	Count					
Party	Candidate	FPv%	1	2	3	4	5	6
Independent	Catherine Murphy*	20.58	2,101					
Labour	John McGinley*	12.48	1,274	1,349	1,351	1,639	1,846	1,913
Fianna Fáil	Paul Kelly*	12.11	1,237	1,541	1,551	1,603	1,766	2,089
Labour	Colm Purcell	11.66	1,191	1,220	1,238	1,264	1,430	1,729
Fine Gael	Tom Neville	11.11	1,134	1,152	1,163	1,190	1,356	
Fine Gael	Senan Griffin*	10.29	1,051	1,125	1,128	1,301	1,426	1,832
Green	Shane Fitzgerald	7.98	815	853	862	1,027		
Independent	Paul Croghan	7.62	778	819	824			
Fianna Fáil	Brid Feely	6.17	630					
Electorate: 20,732 Valid: 10,211 (49.25%) Spoilt: 147 Quota: 2,043 Turnout: 10,358 (49.96%)

=== Naas ===
Naas - 5 seats
Party	Candidate	FPv%	Count										
Party	Candidate	FPv%	1	2	3	4	5	6	7	8	9	10	11
Labour	Paddy McNamara	8.81	1,254	1,320	1,373	1,384	1,494	1,552	1,574	1,983	2,063	2,158	2,267
Fine Gael	Billy Hillis*	8.71	1,240	1,246	1,261	1,276	1,288	1,484	1,499	1,639	1,678	1,752	2,267
Independent	Mary Glennon*	8.60	1,225	1,233	1,266	1,585	1,690	1,747	1,818	1,870	2,029	2,245	2,432
Green	J.J. Power	8.52	1,213	1,230	1,346	1,376	1,434	1,512	1,557	1,631	1,802	1,946	2,087
Fianna Fáil	Rose Barrett-O'Donoghue	8.48	1,207	1,284	1,320	1,329	1,354	1,384	1,538	1,623	1,680	1,808	1,892
Fianna Fáil	Willie Callaghan*	7.94	1,130	1,194	1,219	1,235	1,252	1,284	1,603	1,645	1,829	1,970	2,156
Progressive Democrats	Pat Clear	6.64	945	972	983	1,002	1,034	1,098	1,133	1,165	1,249		
Fine Gael	Timmy Conway*	6.29	896	906	917	926	964	1,118	1,193	1,222	1,348	1,547	
Independent	Seamus Moore	6.05	862	872	901	927	974	1,005	1,058	1,089			
Labour	John Hubbard	6.03	859	862	889	903	921	940	960				
Fianna Fáil	Charlie Byrne	5.44	775	808	830	845	873	896					
Fine Gael	Darren Scully	5.14	732	748	757	766	796						
Independent	Anthony Egan	3.65	520	527	554	578							
Independent	Tom Cross	3.52	501	525	538								
Sinn Féin	Cristin McCauley	3.40	484	495									
Fianna Fáil	Carmel Kelly	2.79	397										
Electorate: 28,018 Valid: 14,240 (50.82%) Spoilt: 295 Quota: 2,374 Turnout: 14,535 (51.88%)
