= Áras Chill Dara =

Municipal building in County Kildare, Ireland

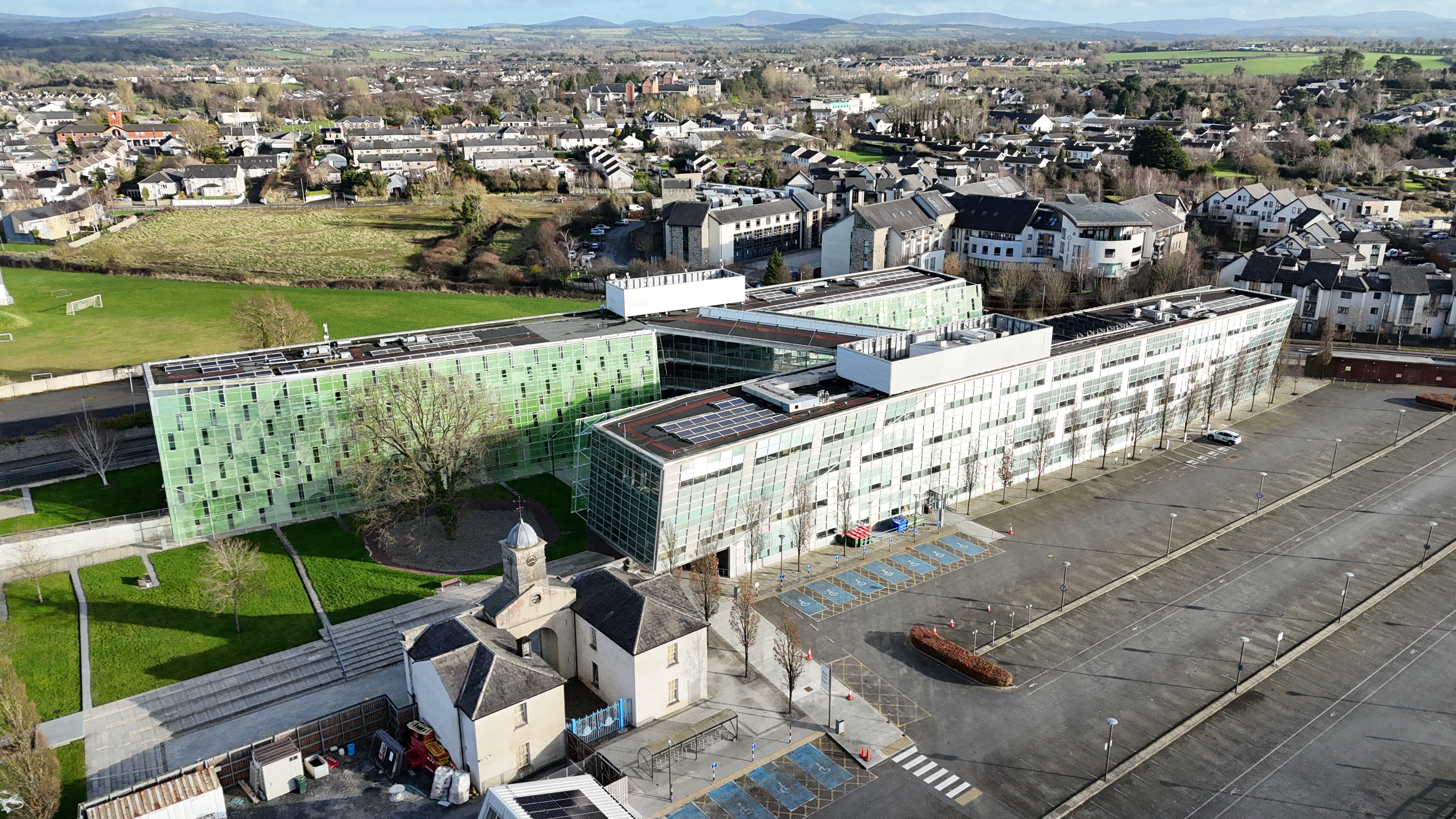
- Áras Chill Dara in 2025

- Location within Ireland

General information
- Architectural style: Modern style
- Location: Naas, County Kildare, Ireland
- Coordinates: 53.2145°N 6.6718°W
- Completed: 2006

Design and construction
- Architect: Heneghan Peng Architects

Áras Chill Dara (English: Kildare Building) is a municipal facility in Prosperous Road, Naas, County Kildare, Ireland.

== History ==
Previously Kildare County Council had used the former St Mary's Fever Hospital in Naas as its offices. By late 1990s, the old hospital buildings were in poor condition, and the county council identified the former Devoy Barracks site, which had been vacated in 1998, as its preferred location for new facilities. The new building, which was designed by Heneghan Peng Architects, was built at the former military site and was completed in 2006. The design featured two glass blocks with sloping walls linked by a four-storey bridge. The design won an award in the RIBA European Awards 2006.
