= Ireland Palestine Solidarity Campaign =

Irish activist organisation

- Formation: 2001
- Purpose: Activism, Palestinian Solidarity
- Headquarters: Dublin, Ireland
- Key people: Zoë Lawlor (chair); Fatin Al Tamimi (vice-chair)
- Website: https://www.ipsc.ie

The Ireland Palestine Solidarity Campaign (IPSC) is an independent, volunteer-run, activist organisation in Ireland that advocates for Palestinian human rights and works in partnership with Palestinians living in Ireland. It aims to amplify the Palestinian voice within Ireland and campaigns against what it sees as violations of international law and human rights in the context of the Israeli-Palestinian conflict. It was founded in 2001.

Members of the IPSC were alleged to have joined Clare Daly, Mick Wallace, Maureen O’Sullivan and Catherine Connolly on a visit to Damascus, Maaloula and Aleppo in Syria in 2018. While there, Clare Daly criticised "Israeli, Saudi, American and Turkish interference" in Syria, but did not criticise the Bashar al-Assad government nor Russian influence. In July 2025, the IPSC stated to the TheJournal.ie that that the IPSC "did not organise, endorse, or participate in, any trip to Syria and has no specific knowledge regarding the trip in question", and suggested that while pro-Palestinian Irish activists may have taken part in the trip, some who may have been IPSC members, the organisation itself was not involved.

Shónagh Ní Raghallaigh of Sinn Féin is involved in the County Kildare branch of the organisation.

== See also ==
- Palestine Solidarity Campaign, UK campaign
