= Aidan Farrelly =

Irish politician (born 1986/87)

Aidan Farrelly TD
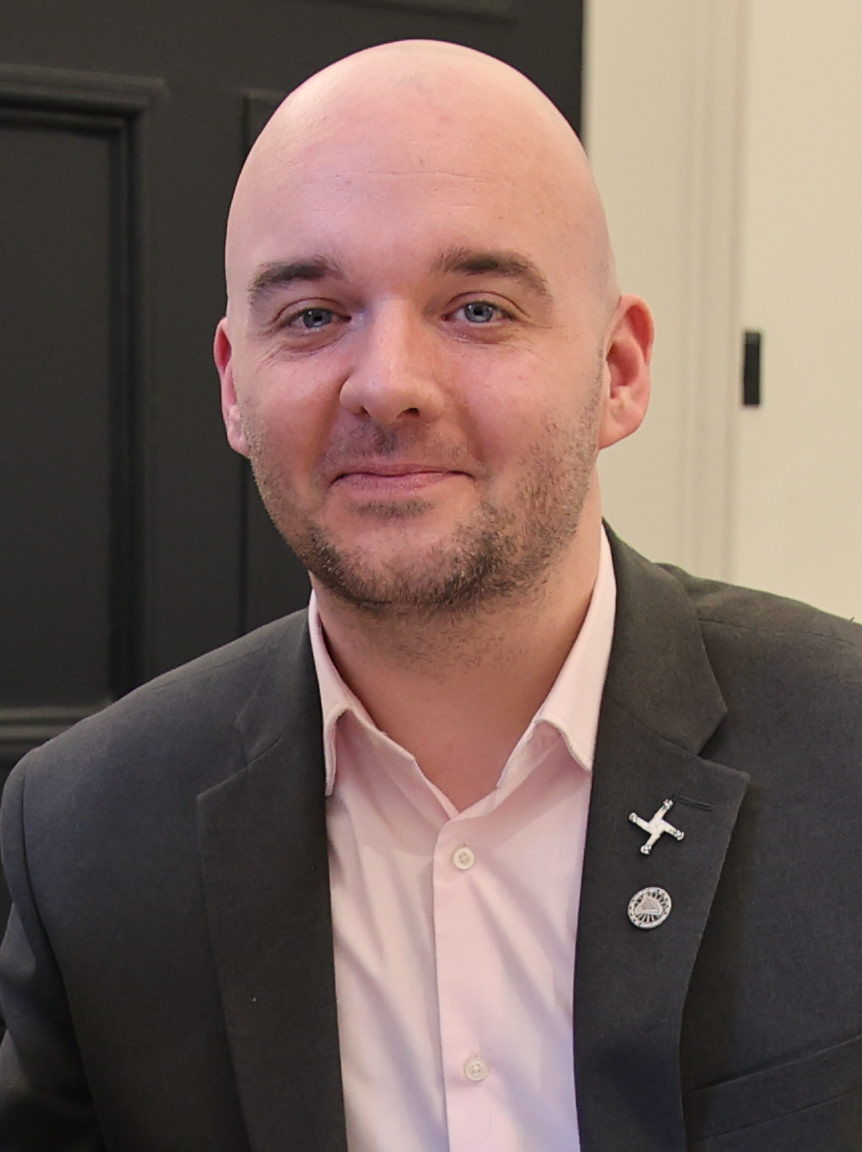
- Farrelly in 2024

Teachta Dála
- Incumbent
- Assumed office November 2024
- Constituency: Kildare North

Personal details
- Born: 1986/1987 (age 38–39)
- Party: Social Democrats
- Spouse: Aisling Farrelly
- Children: 3
- Education: St Patrick's, Carlow College; Maynooth University

Aidan Farrelly (born 1986/1987) is an Irish Social Democrats politician who has been a Teachta Dála (TD) for the Kildare North constituency since the 2024 general election. He retained the seat for the Social Democrats, previously held by the party's retiring founder Catherine Murphy.

Farrelly previously represented the Clane area on Kildare County Council from 2019 to 2024. He is a lecturer in social policy and youth work at Maynooth University, having experience in Kildare Youth Services.

== Early life and education ==
Farrelly grew up in Clane. He graduated with a Bachelor of Arts in Applied Social Sciences from St Patrick's, Carlow College in 2008. He went on to complete a Master of Science in Community and Youth Work in 2018 and a Doctorate of Social Science in 2024, both at Maynooth University.

== Career ==
Farrelly began his career in community development and youth work. He contributed to Clane Youth Project in 2007. From 2008 to 2021, he was a team leader in Kildare Youth Services.

At the 2019 local elections, Farrelly was elected to represent the Clane area on Kildare County Council for the Social Democrats. The following year, he began lecturing in community and youth work at Maynooth University in the Department of Applied Social Studies. He joined the National Youth Council of Ireland as a research officer in 2023. Farrelly successfully sought re-elected as a councillor in the 2024 local elections.

Shortly after his re-election to Kildare Council, Farrelly was selected as a general election candidate for Kildare North in the 2024 general election, replacing the retiring Social Democrats party founder Catherine Murphy. Ahead of the election, Farrelly helped launch the party's youth manifesto with Murphy.

== Personal life ==
Farrelly lives in Prosperous with his wife Aisling. They have three children.

== Select bibliography ==
- "Youth Work as Transformative Education: A reflection on the National Youth Council of Ireland's pedagogical bootcamp" in Policy and Practice: A Development Education Review (2023) for the Centre for Global Education, co-written with Sally Daly

Dáil	Election	Deputy (Party)	Deputy (Party)	Deputy (Party)	Deputy (Party)	Deputy (Party)
28th	1997	Emmet Stagg (Lab)	Charlie McCreevy (FF)	Bernard Durkan (FG)	3 seats until 2007	
29th	2002	Emmet Stagg (Lab)	Charlie McCreevy (FF)	Bernard Durkan (FG)	3 seats until 2007	
29th	2005 by-election	Emmet Stagg (Lab)	Catherine Murphy (Ind.)	Bernard Durkan (FG)	3 seats until 2007	
30th	2007	Emmet Stagg (Lab)	Áine Brady (FF)	Bernard Durkan (FG)	Michael Fitzpatrick (FF)	4 seats until 2024
31st	2011	Emmet Stagg (Lab)	Catherine Murphy (Ind.)	Bernard Durkan (FG)	Anthony Lawlor (FG)	4 seats until 2024
32nd	2016	Frank O'Rourke (FF)	Catherine Murphy (SD)	Bernard Durkan (FG)	James Lawless (FF)	4 seats until 2024
33rd	2020	Réada Cronin (SF)	Catherine Murphy (SD)	Bernard Durkan (FG)	James Lawless (FF)	4 seats until 2024
34th	2024	Réada Cronin (SF)	Aidan Farrelly (SD)	Joe Neville (FG)	James Lawless (FF)	Naoise Ó Cearúil (FF)
