= Shónagh Ní Raghallaigh =

Irish politician

Shónagh Ní Raghallaigh TD
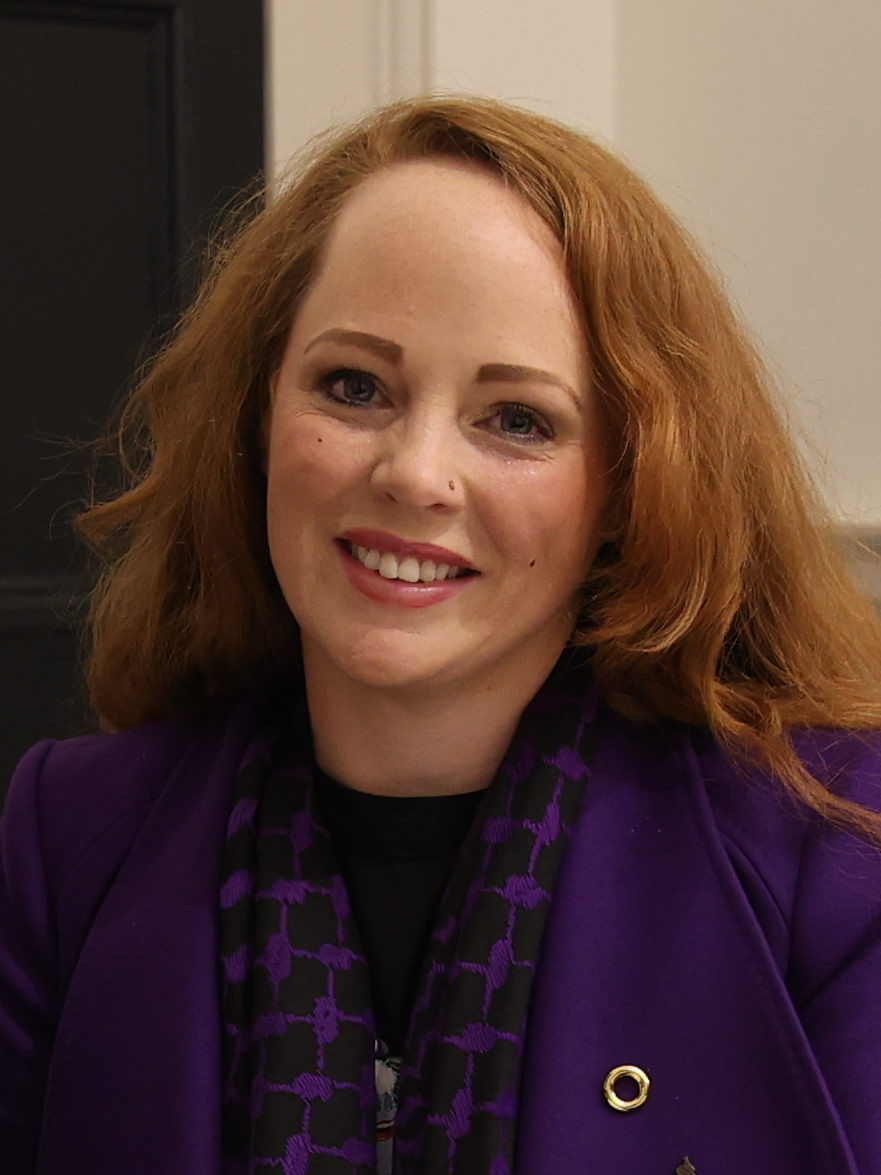
- Ní Raghallaigh in 2024

Teachta Dála
- Incumbent
- Assumed office November 2024
- Constituency: Kildare South

Personal details
- Born: 1982/1983 (age 42–43)
- Party: Sinn Féin
- Children: 4

Shónagh Ní Raghallaigh (born 1982/1983) is an Irish Sinn Féin politician who has been a Teachta Dála (TD) for the Kildare South constituency since the 2024 general election.

== Early and personal life ==
She has four children. She speaks fluent Irish. Before becoming a TD she was a primary school teacher.

Ní Raghallaigh is involved in the County Kildare chapter of the Ireland Palestine Solidarity Campaign. She has Attention deficit hyperactivity disorder (ADHD), which she was diagnosed with as an adult.

== Political career ==
She was elected at the 2024 Kildare County Council election in June 2024. She served as a councillor until she was elected to the Dáil in November 2024.

== Political views ==
On election to the Dáil, Ní Raghallaigh told The Irish Times "Promoting Gaeilge is a core priority for me. I believe the language is more than just a cultural treasure; it's a tool for connection and identity and it deserves a vibrant future". Ní Raghallaigh stated that she sees the Dáil as a "key platform to normalise Gaeilge and highlight its importance in modern Irish life" and that she wanted to "show that the language is for everyone, whether you're fluent or just learning".

Ní Raghallaigh also told The Irish Times that she has ADHD and wants to advocate for women seeking mental health treatment. She was appointed as Sinn Féin's junior spokesperson on Special Education on 19 February 2025.

In September 2025 she criticised Danny Healy-Rae for comments he made about autism in a Dáil debate.

Dáil	Election	Deputy (Party)	Deputy (Party)	Deputy (Party)	Deputy (Party)
28th	1997	Jack Wall (Lab)	Alan Dukes (FG)	Seán Power (FF)	3 seats 1997–2020
29th	2002	Jack Wall (Lab)	Seán Ó Fearghaíl (FF)	Seán Power (FF)	3 seats 1997–2020
30th	2007	Jack Wall (Lab)	Seán Ó Fearghaíl (FF)	Seán Power (FF)	3 seats 1997–2020
31st	2011	Jack Wall (Lab)	Seán Ó Fearghaíl (FF)	Martin Heydon (FG)	3 seats 1997–2020
32nd	2016	Fiona O'Loughlin (FF)	Seán Ó Fearghaíl (FF)	Martin Heydon (FG)	3 seats 1997–2020
33rd	2020	Cathal Berry (Ind.)	Seán Ó Fearghaíl (FF)	Martin Heydon (FG)	Patricia Ryan (SF)
34th	2024	Mark Wall (Lab)	Seán Ó Fearghaíl (FF)	Martin Heydon (FG)	Shónagh Ní Raghallaigh (SF)
