= Michael Fitzpatrick (Kildare politician) =

Irish politician (1942–2011)

Teachta Dála
- In office May 2007 – February 2011
- Constituency: Kildare North

Kildare County Councillor
- In office June 1999 – May 2007
- Constituency: Clane

Personal details
- Born: 12 October 1942 Cootehill, County Cavan, Ireland
- Died: 14 October 2011 (aged 69) Allenwood, County Kildare, Ireland
- Party: Fianna Fáil
- Spouse: Maureen Roche
- Children: 1
- Profession: Garda, auctioneer

Michael Fitzpatrick (12 October 1942 – 14 October 2011) was an Irish Fianna Fáil politician. He was elected as Teachta Dála (TD) for the Kildare North constituency at the 2007 general election, and served until 2011.

He was a member of Kildare County Council for the Clane electoral area from 1999 to 2007. He was a member of the Garda Síochána from 1961 to 1972. He was the constituency manager in Kildare for former Minister for Finance and European Commissioner Charlie McCreevy from 1992 to 2007. He also was a Kildare mayor.

In 2010, he was diagnosed with motor neurone disease. In an interview with The Irish Times on 12 March 2010, he said he intended to keep working as a TD.

Fitzpatrick said he had "compared notes" with Brian Lenihan. "We are both on a journey. We talk and chat to one another about our illnesses". He gave a presentation on his condition to the Irish Motor Neurone Research Foundation.

He lost his seat at the February 2011 general election and died that October. Fianna Fáil cancelled its Wolfe Tone commemoration at Bodenstown, County Kildare as a mark of respect. His funeral was in the Church of the Immaculate Conception, Allenwood, County Kildare.

Dáil	Election	Deputy (Party)	Deputy (Party)	Deputy (Party)	Deputy (Party)	Deputy (Party)
28th	1997	Emmet Stagg (Lab)	Charlie McCreevy (FF)	Bernard Durkan (FG)	3 seats until 2007	
29th	2002	Emmet Stagg (Lab)	Charlie McCreevy (FF)	Bernard Durkan (FG)	3 seats until 2007	
29th	2005 by-election	Emmet Stagg (Lab)	Catherine Murphy (Ind.)	Bernard Durkan (FG)	3 seats until 2007	
30th	2007	Emmet Stagg (Lab)	Áine Brady (FF)	Bernard Durkan (FG)	Michael Fitzpatrick (FF)	4 seats until 2024
31st	2011	Emmet Stagg (Lab)	Catherine Murphy (Ind.)	Bernard Durkan (FG)	Anthony Lawlor (FG)	4 seats until 2024
32nd	2016	Frank O'Rourke (FF)	Catherine Murphy (SD)	Bernard Durkan (FG)	James Lawless (FF)	4 seats until 2024
33rd	2020	Réada Cronin (SF)	Catherine Murphy (SD)	Bernard Durkan (FG)	James Lawless (FF)	4 seats until 2024
34th	2024	Réada Cronin (SF)	Aidan Farrelly (SD)	Joe Neville (FG)	James Lawless (FF)	Naoise Ó Cearúil (FF)
