= Emmet Stagg =

Irish politician (1944–2024)

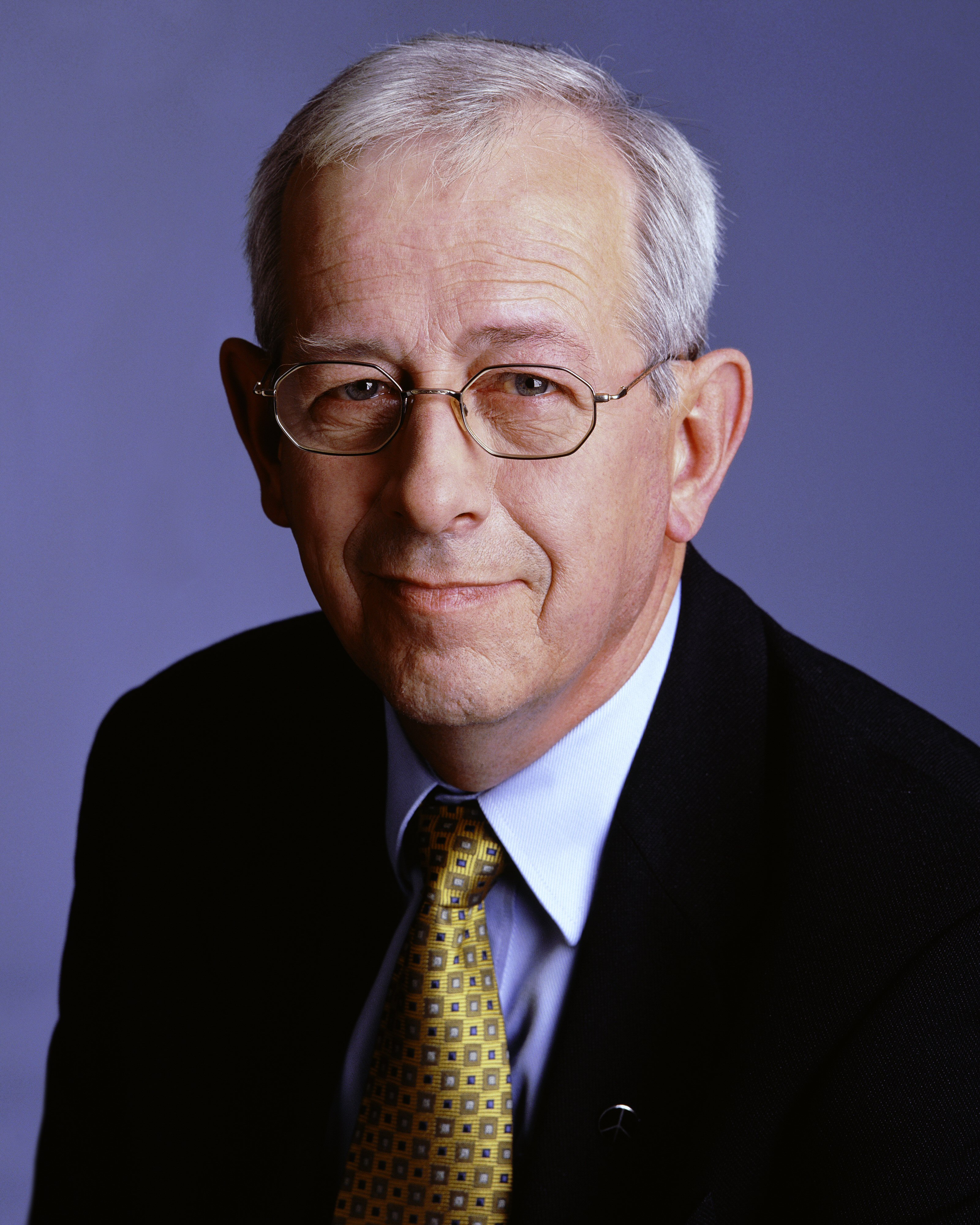
- Stagg, c. 2002

Minister of State
- 1994–1997: Transport, Energy and Communications
- 1993–1994: Environment

Teachta Dála
- In office June 1997 – February 2016
- Constituency: Kildare North
- In office February 1987 – June 1997
- Constituency: Kildare

Personal details
- Born: 1 October 1944 Hollymount, County Mayo, Ireland
- Died: 17 March 2024 (aged 79) County Kildare, Ireland
- Party: Labour Party
- Spouse: Mary Morris
- Children: 2
- Relatives: Frank Stagg (brother)
- Education: Dublin Institute of Technology

Emmet Stagg (1 October 1944 – 17 March 2024) was an Irish Labour Party politician who served as Labour Party Chief Whip from 2007 to 2016, and as a Minister of State from January 1993 to November 1994 and from December 1994 to June 1997. He served as a Teachta Dála (TD) from 1987 to 2016.

== Early life ==
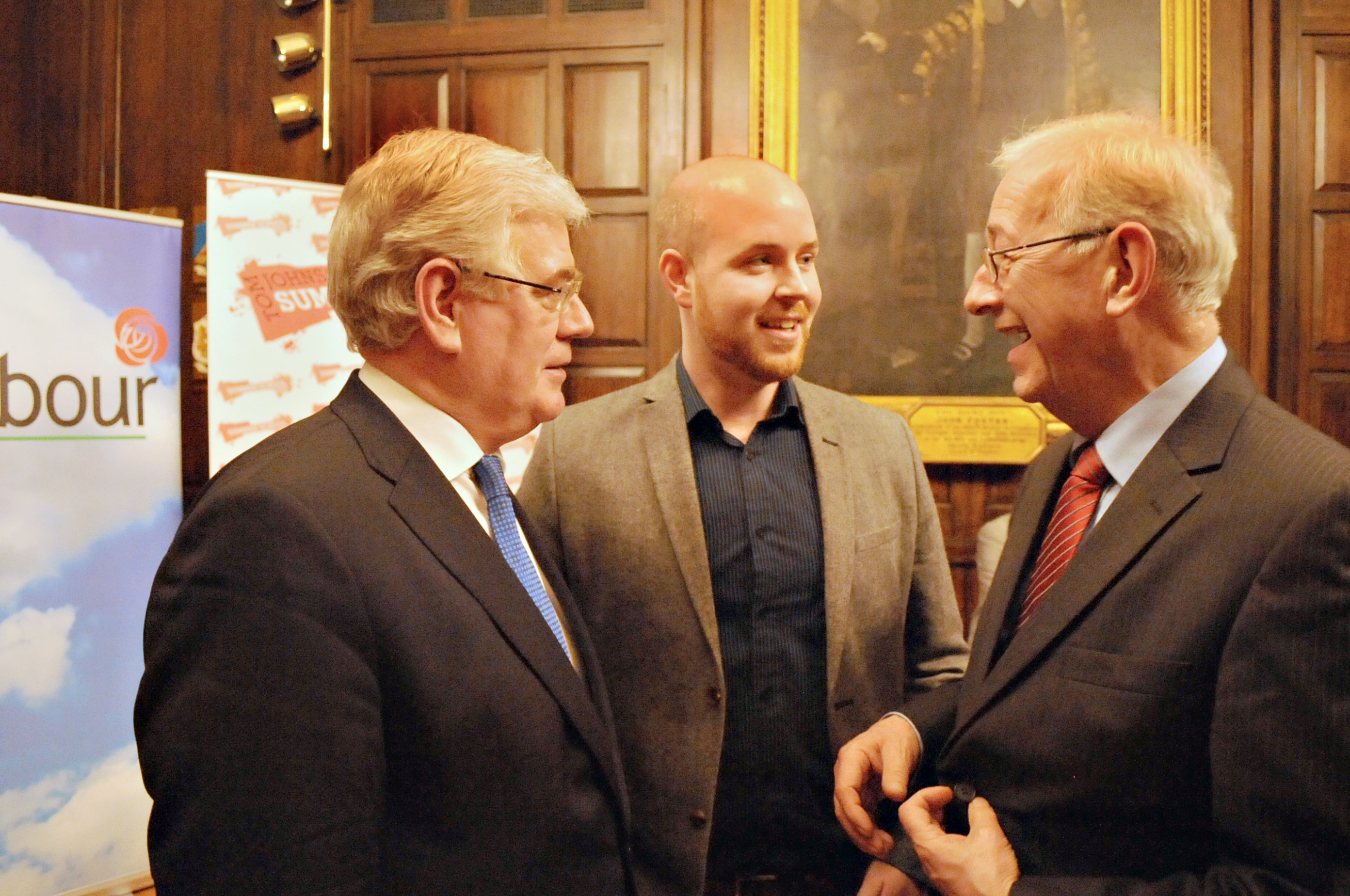
Emmet Stagg with Eamon Gilmore

Stagg was born at Hollymount, County Mayo, and was one of thirteen siblings raised by parents, including his brother Frank Stagg. Stagg described his childhood in Mayo as being gripped by poverty and by the rule of the Catholic Church. He was educated at Ballinrobe CBS school and Kevin Street College of Technology. He worked as a medical technologist at Trinity College Dublin before entering full-time politics.

== Political career ==
Stagg was elected in 1979 to represent the Celbridge area on Kildare County Council for the Labour Party, serving until 1993. He was elected again in 1999, serving until 2003. Stagg was first elected to Dáil Éireann at the 1987 general election for the Kildare constituency. He then served as Labour front bench spokesperson in various portfolios, including Agriculture (1987–1989) and Social Welfare (1989–1992).

During the 1980s and early 1990s, Stagg was a prominent figure within the internal politics of the Labour Party, being viewed along with Michael D. Higgins and Joe Higgins as one of the leaders of the left-wing faction within the party opposed to coalition with Fine Gael, and as a prominent opponent of the then party leader Dick Spring. He opposed the expulsion of Joe Higgins and Militant Tendency at the 1989 conference, and in the early 1990s he considered leaving the party and joining the newly formed Democratic Left, though he ultimately chose to stay with the party. In January 1993, in the Fianna Fáil–Labour Party coalition government formed after the 1992 general election, he was appointed as Minister of State at the Department of the Environment, with special responsibility for Housing and Urban Renewal. Labour left this government in November 1994. In December 1994, in the Rainbow coalition government, Stagg was appointed as Minister of State at the Department of Transport, Energy and Communications, serving until June 1997.

Stagg lost his seat at the 2016 general election, having served as a TD for 29 consecutive years.

Stagg was the Labour Party candidate for Kildare North at the 2020 general election. At age 75, he was the oldest candidate in the entire general election, but was not elected.

== Phoenix Park scandal ==
In 1994, while Minister of State, Stagg became the subject of a major press scandal after gardaí had found him the previous November loitering in an area of Dublin's Phoenix Park used by male prostitutes. He was questioned by the gardaí but no charges were filed against him. According to The Independent, public anger was largely focused on the member of the gardaí who leaked details to the media despite no crime being committed.

== Personal life and death ==
Emmet Stagg's brother Frank Stagg was a Provisional Irish Republican Army member, who died in a British prison in 1976 while on hunger strike. Emmet and his brothers quarrelled over whether Frank should be buried with his family, or in a dedicated "Republican" plot. The resulting dispute, into which the Irish government directly intervened, escalated into mayhem that resulted in the body of Frank Stagg being buried three separate times.

Stagg died on 17 March 2024, following a long illness. He was 79 years old.

Dáil	Election	Deputy (Party)	Deputy (Party)	Deputy (Party)
4th	1923	Hugh Colohan (Lab)	John Conlan (FP)	George Wolfe (CnaG)
5th	1927 (Jun)	Hugh Colohan (Lab)	Domhnall Ua Buachalla (FF)	George Wolfe (CnaG)
6th	1927 (Sep)	Hugh Colohan (Lab)	Domhnall Ua Buachalla (FF)	George Wolfe (CnaG)
6th	1931 by-election	Thomas Harris (FF)	Domhnall Ua Buachalla (FF)	George Wolfe (CnaG)
7th	1932	Thomas Harris (FF)	William Norton (Lab)	Sydney Minch (CnaG)
8th	1933	Thomas Harris (FF)	William Norton (Lab)	Sydney Minch (CnaG)
9th	1937	Constituency abolished. See Carlow–Kildare		

Dáil	Election	Deputy (Party)	Deputy (Party)	Deputy (Party)	Deputy (Party)	Deputy (Party)
13th	1948	William Norton (Lab)	Thomas Harris (FF)	Gerard Sweetman (FG)	3 seats until 1961	3 seats until 1961
14th	1951	William Norton (Lab)	Thomas Harris (FF)	Gerard Sweetman (FG)	3 seats until 1961	3 seats until 1961
15th	1954	William Norton (Lab)	Thomas Harris (FF)	Gerard Sweetman (FG)	3 seats until 1961	3 seats until 1961
16th	1957	William Norton (Lab)	Patrick Dooley (FF)	Gerard Sweetman (FG)	3 seats until 1961	3 seats until 1961
17th	1961	William Norton (Lab)	Patrick Dooley (FF)	Gerard Sweetman (FG)	Brendan Crinion (FF)	4 seats 1961–1969
17th	1964 by-election	Terence Boylan (FF)	Patrick Dooley (FF)	Gerard Sweetman (FG)	Brendan Crinion (FF)	4 seats 1961–1969
18th	1965	Terence Boylan (FF)	Patrick Norton (Lab)	Gerard Sweetman (FG)	Brendan Crinion (FF)	4 seats 1961–1969
19th	1969	Terence Boylan (FF)	Paddy Power (FF)	Gerard Sweetman (FG)	3 seats 1969–1981	3 seats 1969–1981
19th	1970 by-election	Terence Boylan (FF)	Paddy Power (FF)	Patrick Malone (FG)	3 seats 1969–1981	3 seats 1969–1981
20th	1973	Joseph Bermingham (Lab)	Paddy Power (FF)	Patrick Malone (FG)	3 seats 1969–1981	3 seats 1969–1981
21st	1977	Joseph Bermingham (Lab)	Paddy Power (FF)	Charlie McCreevy (FF)	3 seats 1969–1981	3 seats 1969–1981
22nd	1981	Joseph Bermingham (Lab)	Paddy Power (FF)	Charlie McCreevy (FF)	Bernard Durkan (FG)	Alan Dukes (FG)
23rd	1982 (Feb)	Joseph Bermingham (Lab)	Paddy Power (FF)	Charlie McCreevy (FF)	Gerry Brady (FF)	Alan Dukes (FG)
24th	1982 (Nov)	Joseph Bermingham (Lab)	Paddy Power (FF)	Charlie McCreevy (FF)	Bernard Durkan (FG)	Alan Dukes (FG)
25th	1987	Emmet Stagg (Lab)	Paddy Power (FF)	Charlie McCreevy (FF)	Bernard Durkan (FG)	Alan Dukes (FG)
26th	1989	Emmet Stagg (Lab)	Seán Power (FF)	Charlie McCreevy (FF)	Bernard Durkan (FG)	Alan Dukes (FG)
27th	1992	Emmet Stagg (Lab)	Seán Power (FF)	Charlie McCreevy (FF)	Bernard Durkan (FG)	Alan Dukes (FG)
28th	1997	Constituency abolished. See Kildare North and Kildare South				

Dáil	Election	Deputy (Party)	Deputy (Party)	Deputy (Party)	Deputy (Party)	Deputy (Party)
28th	1997	Emmet Stagg (Lab)	Charlie McCreevy (FF)	Bernard Durkan (FG)	3 seats until 2007	
29th	2002	Emmet Stagg (Lab)	Charlie McCreevy (FF)	Bernard Durkan (FG)	3 seats until 2007	
29th	2005 by-election	Emmet Stagg (Lab)	Catherine Murphy (Ind.)	Bernard Durkan (FG)	3 seats until 2007	
30th	2007	Emmet Stagg (Lab)	Áine Brady (FF)	Bernard Durkan (FG)	Michael Fitzpatrick (FF)	4 seats until 2024
31st	2011	Emmet Stagg (Lab)	Catherine Murphy (Ind.)	Bernard Durkan (FG)	Anthony Lawlor (FG)	4 seats until 2024
32nd	2016	Frank O'Rourke (FF)	Catherine Murphy (SD)	Bernard Durkan (FG)	James Lawless (FF)	4 seats until 2024
33rd	2020	Réada Cronin (SF)	Catherine Murphy (SD)	Bernard Durkan (FG)	James Lawless (FF)	4 seats until 2024
34th	2024	Réada Cronin (SF)	Aidan Farrelly (SD)	Joe Neville (FG)	James Lawless (FF)	Naoise Ó Cearúil (FF)
