= Timmy Conway =

Irish former politician (born 1942)

Senator
- In office 13 May 1982 – 25 April 1987
- Constituency: Industrial and Commercial Panel
- In office 8 October 1981 – 13 May 1982
- Constituency: Nominated by the Taoiseach

Personal details
- Born: 27 October 1942 (age 82); County Kildare, Ireland
- Political party: Labour Party; Progressive Democrats; Fine Gael

Timothy Conway (born 27 October 1942) is an Irish former politician from Naas in County Kildare. An accountant and long-serving local councillor, he served for six years as a senator in the 1980s and later contested two general elections. In the course of his political career he switched party twice, moving from the Labour Party to the Progressive Democrats and then to Fine Gael.

== Political career ==
Conway joined the Labour Party as a trainee accountant in the 1970s, and was later elected as a member of Kildare County Council. He was Labour's director of elections in the Kildare constituency at the 1981 general election, after which he was nominated by the Taoiseach, Garret FitzGerald, as a member of the 15th Seanad. The appointment was explained by the Labour Party's secretary, Seamus Scally, as an organisational one: Conway would be responsible for organising and improving the finances of the party in the Leinster area.

The following year he was elected to the 16th Seanad, topping the poll on the Industrial and Commercial Panel. He was re-elected in 1983 to the 17th Seanad, this time coming second in the first-preference votes behind Fianna Fáil's Eoin Ryan.

He left the Labour Party in 1986 to become a founder member of the new Progressive Democrats party (PDs). He did not contest the 1987 elections to the 18th Seanad because the Progressive Democrats policy at the time called for the abolition of the Seanad. At the 1989 general election he stood unsuccessfully as a Progressive Democrats candidate in the Kildare constituency, and he was unsuccessful again when he stood in the new Kildare North constituency in 1997.

Conway remained a member of Kildare County Council and of Naas Town Council, where he initiated the town's twinning with the American city of Omaha, Nebraska. He was one of three of the town's nine councillors whose council-funded trip to Omaha was described by another councillor as a "gravy train". He was twice chairman of the county council, and served as Mayor of Naas from 2002 to 2003. However, in June 2003 he left the Progressive Democrats to join Fine Gael, and in the 2004 local elections he lost his seats on both the town council and the county council.
