= Kildare County Council =

Local authority of County Kildare in Ireland

Kildare County Council Comhairle Contae Chill Dara

Type
- Type: County council of County Kildare

History
- Founded: 1 April 1899

Leadership
- Cathaoirleach: Tim Durkan, FG

Structure
- Seats: 40
- Political groups: Fianna Fáil (12) Fine Gael (11) Labour (6) Social Democrats (5) Sinn Féin (1) Independent Ireland (2) Independent (4)

Elections
- Last election: 7 June 2024

Motto
- Meanma agus Misneach (Irish) "Spirit and Courage"

Meeting place
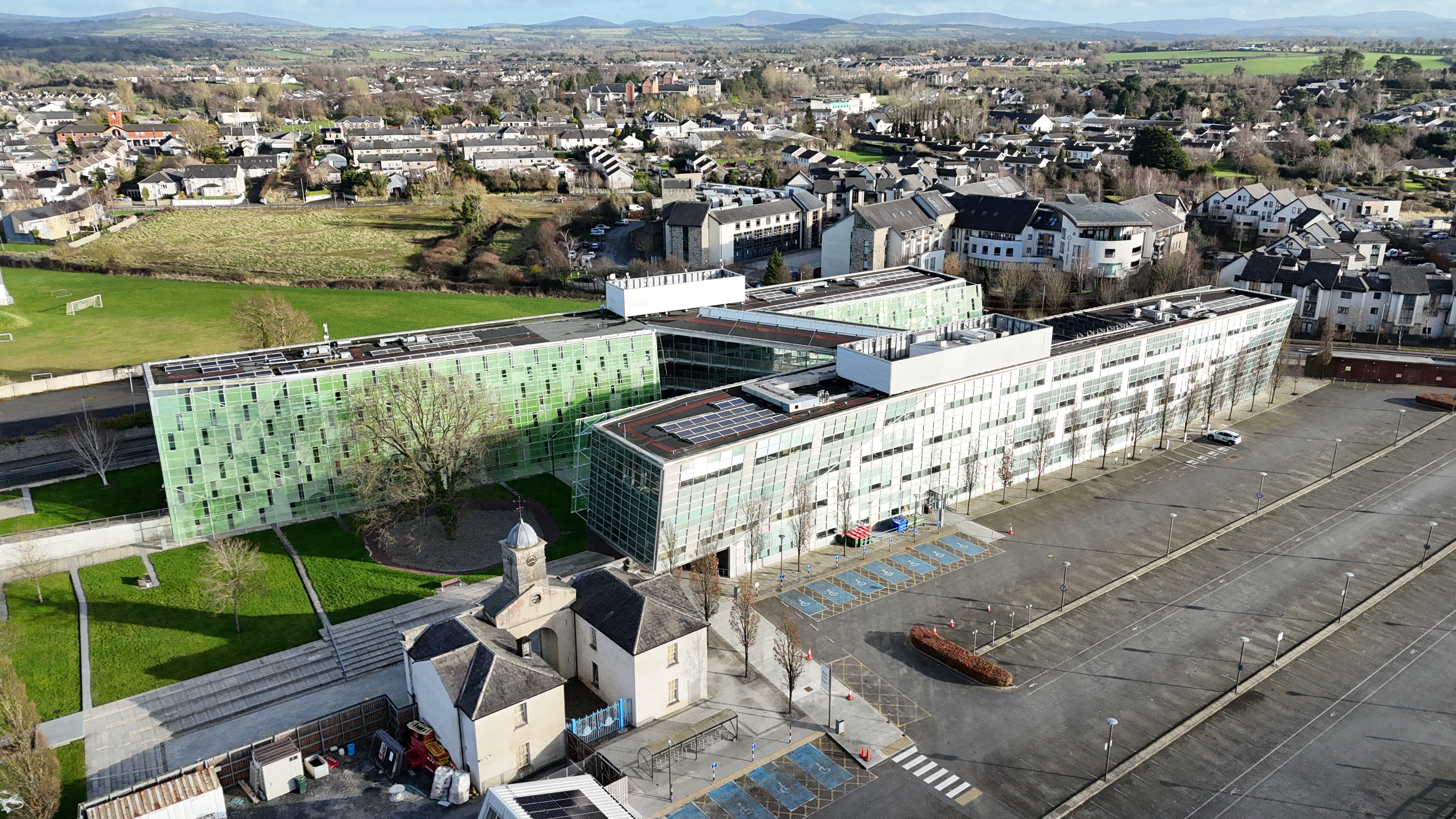
- Áras Chill Dara, Naas

Website
- Official website

Kildare County Council (Irish: Comhairle Contae Chill Dara) is the local authority of County Kildare, Ireland. As a county council, it is governed by the Local Government Act 2001. The council is responsible for housing and community, roads and transportation, urban planning and development, amenity and culture, and environment. The council has 40 elected members. Elections are held every five years and are by single transferable vote. The head of the council has the title of Cathaoirleach (chairperson). The county administration is headed by a chief executive, Sonya Kavanagh. The county town is Naas.

== History ==
Kildare County Council was established on 1 April 1899 under the Local Government (Ireland) Act 1898 for the administrative county of County Kildare, succeeding the former judicial county of Kildare. It was originally based at Naas Courthouse but, after a major fire in the courthouse, moved to the former St Mary's Fever Hospital in the late 1950s. By late 1990s, the old hospital buildings were in poor condition, and the county council identified the former Devoy Barracks site as its preferred location for new facilities. It moved to Áras Chill Dara on the site of the old barracks site in 2006.

== Regional Assembly ==
Kildare County Council has three representatives on the Eastern and Midland Regional Assembly who are part of the Eastern Strategic Planning Area Committee.

== Elections ==
The Local Government (Ireland) Act 1919 introduced the electoral system of proportional representation by means of the single transferable vote (PR-STV) for the 1920 Irish local elections. This electoral system has been retained, with the 40 members of Kildare County Council elected for a five-year term of office from multi-member local electoral areas (LEAs).

Year	FF	FG	Lab	SD	GP	SF	II	PDs	WP	NCP	FP	Rep	SF (pre-1922)	U	IrishNat	Ind.	Total
2024	12	11	5	7	0	1	1	—N/a	0	—N/a	—N/a	—N/a	—N/a	0	—N/a	3	40
2019	12	11	5	4	3	1	—N/a	—N/a	0	—N/a	—N/a	—N/a	—N/a	0	—N/a	4	40
2014	12	9	5	—N/a	0	5	—N/a	—N/a	0	—N/a	—N/a	—N/a	—N/a	0	—N/a	9	40
2009	6	9	6	—N/a	0	0	—N/a	—N/a	0	—N/a	—N/a	—N/a	—N/a	0	—N/a	4	25
2004	10	7	4	—N/a	1	0	—N/a	0	0	—N/a	—N/a	—N/a	—N/a	0	—N/a	3	25
1999	9	5	5	—N/a	0	0	—N/a	2	0	—N/a	—N/a	—N/a	—N/a	0	—N/a	4	25
1991	8	7	3	—N/a	1	1	—N/a	2	1	—N/a	—N/a	—N/a	—N/a	0	—N/a	2	25
1985	10	7	5	—N/a	0	1	—N/a	—N/a	1	—N/a	—N/a	—N/a	—N/a	0	—N/a	1	25
1979	9	8	4	—N/a	—N/a	0	—N/a	—N/a	0	—N/a	—N/a	—N/a	—N/a	0	—N/a	0	21
1974	10	7	3	—N/a	—N/a	0	—N/a	—N/a	0	—N/a	—N/a	—N/a	—N/a	0	—N/a	1	21
1967	8	8	3	—N/a	—N/a	0	—N/a	—N/a	—N/a	—N/a	—N/a	—N/a	—N/a	0	—N/a	2	21
1960	9	8	4	—N/a	—N/a	0	—N/a	—N/a	—N/a	—N/a	—N/a	—N/a	—N/a	0	—N/a	0	21
1955				—N/a	—N/a		—N/a	—N/a	—N/a	—N/a	—N/a	—N/a	—N/a		—N/a		21
1950				—N/a	—N/a		—N/a	—N/a	—N/a	—N/a	—N/a	—N/a	—N/a		—N/a		21
1945				—N/a	—N/a		—N/a	—N/a	—N/a	—N/a	—N/a	—N/a	—N/a		—N/a		21
1942				—N/a	—N/a		—N/a	—N/a	—N/a	—N/a	—N/a	—N/a	—N/a		—N/a		21
1934	10	12	7	—N/a	—N/a	0	—N/a	—N/a	—N/a	—N/a	0	—N/a	—N/a	0	—N/a	0	27
1928	6	—N/a	4	—N/a	—N/a	0	—N/a	—N/a	—N/a	14	0	—N/a	—N/a	0	—N/a	0	24
1925	—N/a	—N/a	13	—N/a	—N/a	—N/a	—N/a	—N/a	—N/a	—N/a	14	1	—N/a	0	—N/a	1	28
1920	—N/a	—N/a	5	—N/a	—N/a	—N/a	—N/a	—N/a	—N/a	—N/a	—N/a	—N/a	15	0	—N/a	1 (Note: Includes Independent Nationalist.)	21
1914	—N/a	—N/a	—N/a	—N/a	—N/a	—N/a	—N/a	—N/a	—N/a	—N/a	—N/a	—N/a	0	2	19	0	21
1911	—N/a	—N/a	—N/a	—N/a	—N/a	—N/a	—N/a	—N/a	—N/a	—N/a	—N/a	—N/a	0	3	18	0	21
1908	—N/a	—N/a	—N/a	—N/a	—N/a	—N/a	—N/a	—N/a	—N/a	—N/a	—N/a	—N/a	0	2	18	1 (Note: It is unclear if Edward Farrell was Unionist or Nationalist, as records do not make mention of it. In the election he was challenged by a Nationalist candidate and a Unionist candidate.)	21
1905	—N/a	—N/a	—N/a	—N/a	—N/a	—N/a	—N/a	—N/a	—N/a	—N/a	—N/a	—N/a	0	2	18	1 (Note: It is unclear if Edward Farrell was Unionist or Nationalist, as records do not make mention of it. In the election he was challenged by a Nationalist candidate and a Unionist candidate.)	21
1902	—N/a	—N/a	—N/a	—N/a	—N/a	—N/a	—N/a	—N/a	—N/a	—N/a	—N/a	—N/a	—N/a	3	18	0	21 (Note: 21 elected, but note an additional 5 members were appointed by the rural district councils and 2 co-opted by the directly elected councillors, giving a total of 28 councillors.)
1899	—N/a	—N/a	—N/a	—N/a	—N/a	—N/a	—N/a	—N/a	—N/a	—N/a	—N/a	—N/a	—N/a	3	18	0	21 (Note: 21 elected, but note an additional 5 members were appointed by the rural district councils, 3 members nominated by the Grand Jury and 2 co-opted by the directly elected councillors, giving a total of 31 councillors.)

== Local electoral areas and municipal districts ==
The area governed by the council

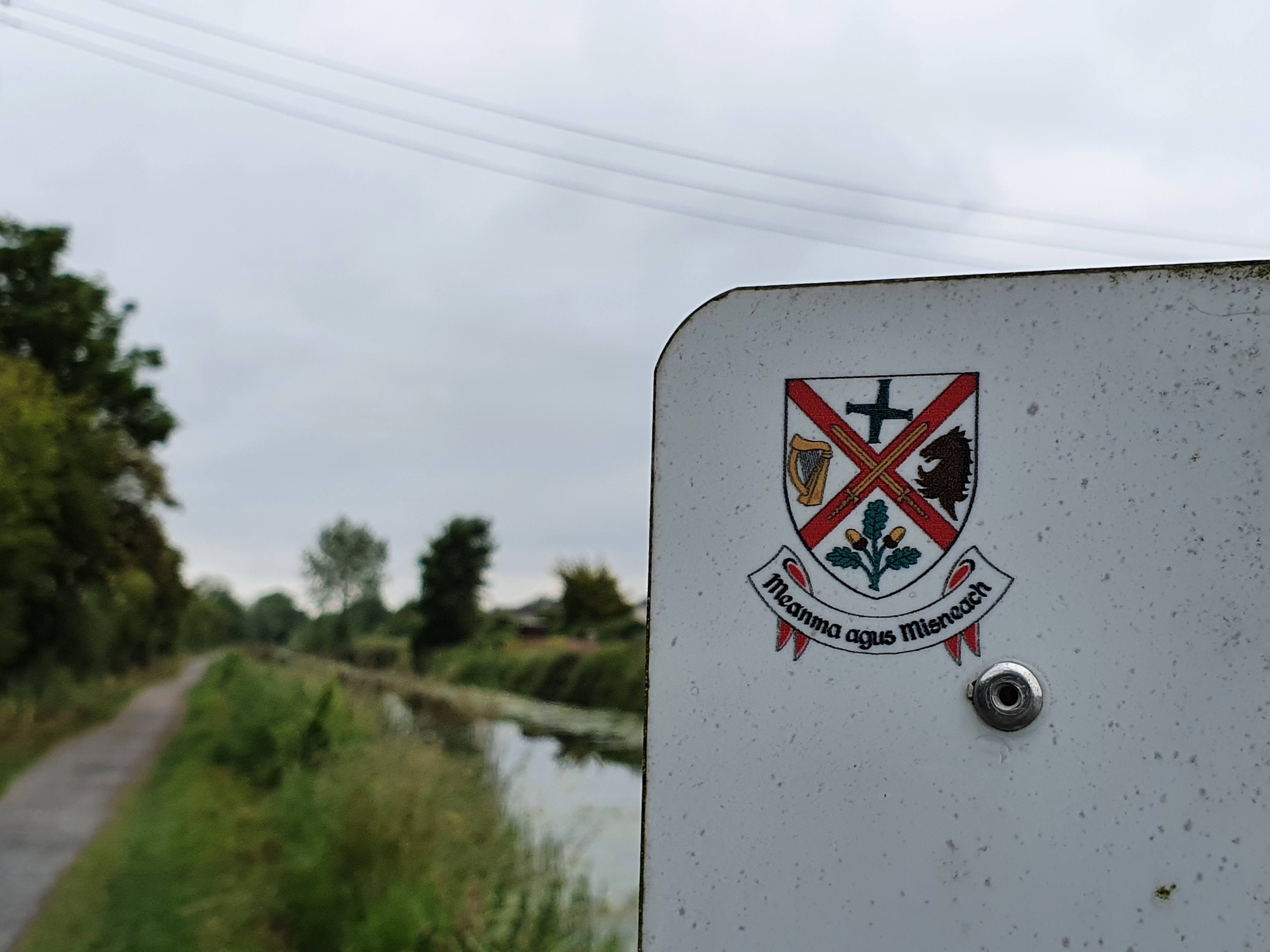
Crest of Kildare County Council photographed alongside the Royal Canal in Maynooth. The County Motto, Meanma agus Misneach (Spirit and Courage), is seen on the crest.

County Kildare is divided into municipal districts and LEAs, defined by electoral divisions.

Municipal district	LEA	Definition	Seats
Athy		Athy East Urban, Athy Rural, Athy West Urban, Ballaghmoon, Ballitore, Ballybrackan, Ballyshannon, Belan, Bert, Burtown, Carrigeen, Castledermot, Churchtown, Dunmanoge, Fontstown, Graney, Grangemellon, Harristown, Inchaquire, Johnstown, Kilberry, Kilkea, Kilrush, Moone, Narraghmore, Nurney, Skerries and Usk.	5
Celbridge–Leixlip	Celbridge	Donaghcumper; and those parts of the electoral division of Celbridge not contained in the local electoral area of Leixlip.	4
Celbridge–Leixlip	Leixlip	Leixlip; and those parts of the electoral division of Celbridge to the north of a line drawn along the M4 motorway.	3
Clane–Maynooth	Clane	Ballynadrumny, Cadamstown, Carbury, Carrick, Clane, Donore, Downings, Drehid, Dunfierth, Kilmeage North, Kilmeage South, Kilpatrick, Kilrainy, Lullymore, Robertstown, Timahoe North, Timahoe South and Windmill Cross.	5
Clane–Maynooth	Maynooth	Balraheen, Cloncurry (in the former Rural District of Celbridge No. 1), Donadea, Kilcock, Maynooth, and Straffan.	5
Kildare–Newbridge	Kildare	Ballysax East, Ballysax West, Cloncurry (in the former Rural District of Edenderry No. 2), Dunmurry, Feighcullen, Kildangan, Kildare, Killinthomas, Lackagh, Monasterevin, Pollardstown, Quinsborough, Rathangan, Rathernan and Thomastown.	5
Kildare–Newbridge	Newbridge	Carnalway, Carragh, Droichead Nua Rural, Droichead Nua Urban, Gilltown, Kilcullen, Ladytown, Morristownbiller and Oldconnell.	6
Naas		Ballymore Eustace, Bodenstown, Kill, Killashee, Kilteel, Naas Rural, Naas Urban, Newtown, Oughterard and Rathmore.	7

== Councillors ==
The following were elected at the 2024 Kildare County Council election.

Party	Seats
Fianna Fáil	12
Fine Gael	11
Social Democrats	7
Labour	5
Independent Ireland	1
Sinn Féin	1
Independent	3

=== Councillors by electoral area ===
This list reflects the order in which councillors were elected on 7 June 2024.

Council members from 2024 election
Local electoral area	Name	Party
Athy	Aoife Breslin	Labour
Athy	Ivan Keatley	Fine Gael
Athy	Brian Dooley	Fianna Fáil
Athy	Veralouise Behan	Fianna Fáil
Athy	Mark Leigh	Labour
Celbridge	David Trost	Fianna Fáil
Celbridge	Claire O'Rourke	Social Democrats
Celbridge	Lumi Panaite Fahey (Note: Replaced during term, see table below for details.)	Fine Gael
Celbridge	Rupert Heather	Labour
Clane	Brendan Wyse	Fine Gael
Clane	Pádraig McEvoy	Independent
Clane	Aidan Farrelly	Social Democrats
Clane	William Durkan	Fine Gael
Clane	Daragh Fitzpatrick	Fianna Fáil
Kildare	Suzanne Doyle	Fianna Fáil
Kildare	Kevin Duffy	Fine Gael
Kildare	Brian O'Loughlin	Fianna Fáil
Kildare	Pat Balfe (Note: Changed party, see table below for details.)	Social Democrats
Kildare	Shónagh Ní Raghallaigh	Sinn Féin
Leixlip	Joe Neville	Fine Gael
Leixlip	Nuala Killeen	Social Democrats
Leixlip	Bernard Caldwell	Fianna Fáil
Maynooth	Naoise Ó Cearúil	Fianna Fáil
Maynooth	Tim Durkan	Fine Gael
Maynooth	Angela Feeney	Labour
Maynooth	Peter Melrose	Social Democrats
Maynooth	Paul Ward	Fianna Fáil
Naas	Bill Clear	Social Democrats
Naas	Fintan Brett	Fine Gael
Naas	Evie Sammon	Fine Gael
Naas	Seamie Moore	Independent
Naas	Anne Breen	Labour
Naas	Carmel Kelly	Fianna Fáil
Naas	Ger Dunne	Independent Ireland
Newbridge	Tracey O'Dwyer	Fine Gael
Newbridge	Peggy O'Dwyer	Fine Gael
Newbridge	Chris Pender	Social Democrats
Newbridge	Noel Heavey	Fianna Fáil
Newbridge	Robert Power	Fianna Fáil
Newbridge	Tom McDonnell	Independent

==== Co-options ====
Party	Outgoing	LEA	Reason	Date	Co-optee
Social Democrats	Aidan Farrelly	Clane	Elected to 34th Dáil at the 2024 general election	19 December 2024	Paula Mulroe
Fine Gael	Joe Neville	Leixlip	Elected to 34th Dáil at the 2024 general election	19 December 2024	Paul Brooks
Sinn Féin	Shónagh Ní Raghallaigh	Kildare	Elected to 34th Dáil at the 2024 general election	19 December 2024	Noel Connolly
Fianna Fáil	Naoise Ó Cearúil	Maynooth	Elected to 34th Dáil at the 2024 general election	19 December 2024	Donna Phelan
Fine Gael	Lumi Panaite Fahey	Celbridge	Resignation	25 November 2025	Declan Ryan

==== Changes in affiliation ====
Name	LEA	Elected as	New affiliation	Date
Bill Clear	Naas	Social Democrats	Independent	September 2024
Bill Clear	Naas	Independent	Independent Ireland	6 November 2025
Pat Balfe	Kildare	Social Democrats	Independent	27 February 2026
Pat Balfe	Kildare	Independent	Labour	2 October 2026
