= List of public inquiries in the Republic of Ireland =

In Ireland, there are several kinds of public inquiry. A Tribunal of Inquiry, often simply called a tribunal, is a powerful type of statutory inquiry whose procedures are governed by the Tribunals of Inquiry (Evidence) Act 1921 as amended. An Oireachtas inquiry is a less powerful non-statutory inquiry controlled directly by the Oireachtas (parliament). A 2013 proposal to strengthen the power of Oireachtas inquiries was defeated at a referendum. The Law Reform Commission published a report in 2005 examining the operation of public inquiries and recommending changes. A commission of investigation is a different form of inquiry, with evidence generally given in private; provided by the Commissions of Investigation Act 2004 to address scandals relating to medical care and child abuse.

== Tribunals of inquiry ==
Tribunals have been held to address many political controversies, increasing in frequency since the Beef Tribunal of the early 1990s. While they have been the subject of many dramatic revelations in Irish politics, they have also become known for running long beyond their intended length – the longest being the Mahon Tribunal (previously the Flood Tribunal) which began in 1997 and issued its final report in 2013.

The Tribunals of Inquiry (Evidence) Act 1921 was enacted by the United Kingdom of Great Britain and Ireland before the setting up of the Irish Free State and as such remains in Ireland. It has, however, been amended since by several Acts of the Oireachtas. The chair of the inquiry is mandated by the Oireachtas (following resolutions in both the Dáil and the Seanad) to carry out the inquiry into matters of urgent public importance by a Warrant of Appointment. The terms of reference of the inquiry are given as part of that warrant.

Tribunals of Inquiry are established by the Oireachtas where the evidence of malfeasance might not be enough to secure a criminal conviction, but where public policy requires answers. Critics of the system say that tribunals: are relatively toothless; may give witnesses immunity that they would not obtain from a court; allow legal representation to all parties, resulting in a higher final cost to the State than the cost of the original malfeasance; and that they can delay difficult political decisions. The Comptroller and Auditor General published a report in 2008 into the cost of Tribunals of Inquiry and making recommendations. It noted that 50%–85% of the cost of recent tribunals had been legal fees for third parties, as distinct from administration and the tribunal's own legal fees.

Tribunals of Inquiry are invested with the powers, privileges and rights of the High Court. It is not a function of a Tribunal to administer justice; their work is solely inquisitorial. Tribunals are required to report their findings to the Oireachtas. They have the power to enforce the attendance and examination of witnesses and the production of relevant documents. Tribunals may consist of one or more persons, though the practise has been to appoint a Sole Member. Tribunals may sit with or without Assessors (who are not Tribunal members). Sittings are usually held in public but can, at the Tribunal's discretion, be held in private.

=== List ===
Tribunals of inquiry since the foundation of the state in 1922
Name	Subject	Member(s) (Note: Where multiple members are listed, the first listed chaired the tribunal.)	Dáil resolution (Note: Date of resolution mandating establishment of Tribunal. External link is to the resolution debate.)	Seanad resolution	Ministerial order (Note: Date of order by minister, or by Governor-General until 1936, establishing tribunal.)	Report laid (Note: Date report was laid before the houses of the Oireachtas. External link is to the report: either an official webpage or a PDF scan from the Oireachtas library.)	Cost (Note: Estimated or actual cost, generally excluding legal costs of third parties where not paid by the state.)
Food Prices Tribunal	Retail prices of "articles in general consumption"	Samuel Lombard Brown, Joseph Johnston, John Busteed, Richard A. Butler, Máire Ní Chinnéide, Bryan Cooper, Thomas Farren, J. F. Maguire, Patrick Shaw	16 December 1925	27 January 1926			£1,667 (Note: 1927 projection)
Ports and Harbours Tribunal	Ports and harbours	H.B. O'Hanlon, C.H. O'Conor, Michael Keegan	19 January 1926	27 January 1926	12 May 1926	1930	
	Shooting of Timothy Coughlan	George P. Cussen, Cyril Beatty, J. S. Troy	15 February 1928	15 February 1928		14 April 1928	
Grain Inquiry Tribunal	Whether mixture of maize meal and maize products with home-grown cereals would be in the national interest	J.J. McElligott, Joseph Whelehan, J.H. Hinchcliff	27 November 1929	28 November 1929	29 November 1929	12 October 1931	
	Marketing of butter	John Dulanty, John P. Colbert, Thomas Duggan, Michael B. McAuliffe, Patrick Vaughan	30 April 1930	14 May 1930		December 1930 (interim report (Note: No other report was issued.))	
Pig Industries Tribunal	Promotion of pig production	Henry J. O'Friel, Daniel Twomey, Joseph B. Whelehan, Patrick A. Rogan	5 May 1933	11 May 1933	18 May 1933	26 January 1934	
	Grading etc. of Fruit and Vegetables	Henry J. O'Friel, Joseph B. Whelehan, Hugh Bradley	12 December 1934	19 December 1934	21 March 1935	14 September 1940	
Town Tenants (Occupation Tenancies)	Hardships in rented urban accommodation	William Black, et al.	13 December 1935	18 December 1935	1936	early in 1941	
	Pearse Street fire	Martin C Maguire, William Ian Bloomer, William Maguire	25 November 1936	N/A (Note: Seanad had been abolished)	5 January 1937	15 September 1937	£622
Public Transport	Public transport	Joseph Ingram	7 December 1938	7 December 1938		1939	
	Fire at St. Josephs Orphanage, Cavan	Joseph A. McCarthy, James J. Comerford, Mary E. Hackett	3 March 1943	10 March 1943	25 March 1943	17 September 1943	
	Dealings in Great Southern Railways Stocks between 1 January 1943 and 18 November 1943	A.K. Overend, Cahir Davitt, Barra Ó Briain	24 November 1943	25 November 1943	1 December 1943	20 September 1944	
Ward Tribunal	Allegations by Patrick MacCarvill against Conn Ward, Parliamentary Secretary to the Minister for Local Government and Public Health	John O'Byrne, Kevin Haugh, William G. Shannon	5 June 1946	5 June 1946	7 June 1946	1946	£4,389
	Supply of milk for the Dublin sale district	Martin C. Maguire, Robert A. O. O'Meara, William C. Kenny	30 November 1944	6 December 1944	1 March 1945	8 July 1947	£650
	Disposal of Locke's Distillery, Kilbeggan	John O'Byrne, Kevin Haugh, Cahir Davitt	5 November 1947	6 November 1947	7 November 1947	20 December 1947	
Cross Channel Freight Rates	Shipping between Ireland and Great Britain	Pádhraic Ó Slatarra, F. Vaughan Buckley, John J. Walsh	23 October 1957	13 November 1957	19 November 1957	12 June 1959	£2,989
	Pay of clerical-grade public servants	Gerard Quinn, Edward J. Gray, Charles McCarthy, Cathal O'Shannon, Joseph S. Quigley	3 October 1965	10 October 1965	30 November 1965	25 May 1966	
	Death of Liam O'Mahony in Garda custody	William FitzGerald, George D. Murnaghan, John Charles Conroy	18 July 1967	19 July 1967	19 July 1967	1 December 1967	£13,000
Tribunal on Teacher's Salaries	Teachers' salaries	Louden Ryan, Ernest Benson, Maurice P. Cosgrave, L.M. Fitzgerald, Cathal O'Shannon			15 December 1967	23 May 1968	
	"Seven Days" Television programme on Illegal Moneylending	Seán de Buitléir, A. Denis Pringle, Patrick O'T—	18 December 1969	17 December 1969	22 December 1969	5 August 1970	
	Allegations made in the Dáil by Bobby Molloy and Brendan Crinion against James Tully, the Minister For Local Government	Séamus Henchy, Weldon R.C. Parke, John Charles Conroy	3 July 1975	4 July 1975	4 July 1975	1 August 1975	
Costello Inquiry	Whiddy Island Disaster	Declan Costello	6 March 1979	6 March 1979	9 April 1979	26 July 1980	
	Fire at Stardust Club, Artane	Ronan Keane	18 February 1981	19 February 1981	20 February 1981	12 November 1982	
Kerry Babies Tribunal	Kerry Babies case	Kevin Lynch	11 December 1984	12 December 1984	13 December 1984	4 October 1985	
Beef Tribunal	Beef Processing Industry	Liam Hamilton	24 May 1991	29 May 1991	31 May 1991	9 August 1994	€27.233m
Finlay Tribunal	Hepatitis C infection of pregnant women from Rho(D) immune globulin	Thomas Finlay	17 October 1996	17 October 1996	24 October 1996	11 March 1997	€4.57m
McCracken Tribunal	Alleged Payments by Dunnes Stores	Brian McCracken	6 February 1997	6 February 1997		25 August 1997	€6.56m
Moriarty Tribunal	Payments by Ben Dunne to Charles Haughey and Michael Lowry	Michael Moriarty	11 September 1997	18 September 1997	26 September 1997	December 2006 (Pt 1) March 2011 (Pt 2)	€46.15m (Note: Total up to August 2011; made up of €42.706m to the Tribunal itself and €3.444m in Department of Communications, Energy and Natural Resources legal costs.)
Mahon Tribunal	Planning matters (including rezoning by Dublin County Council and other Dublin local authorities)	Alan Mahon, with Mary Faherty and Gerald Keys; prev Feargus Flood	7 October 1997 / 1 July 1998 / 5 July 2001 / 28 March 2002 / 3 July 2003 / 17 November 2004 (Note: First date is of original resolution; later dates are of resolutions amending its terms of reference.)	8 October 1997 / 2 July 1998 / 5 July 2001 / 28 March 2002 / 4 July 2003 / 17 November 2004	4 November 1997 / 15 July 1998 / 24 October 2002 / 7 July 2003 / 3 December 2004	22 March 2012 (Vol I-IV); 31 July 2013 (Vol V)	€159m (Note: September 2014 estimate. A December 2014 Supreme Court decision may increase this by a further €36m, though this is disputed.)
Lindsay Tribunal	HIV and Hepatitis C infection of haemophiliacs	Alison Lindsay	2 June 1999	2 June 1999		5 September 2002	€46.649m
Barr Tribunal	shooting of John Carthy in Abbeylara, County Longford on 20 April 2000	Robert Barr	17 April 2002	18 April 2002	1 July 2002	20 September 2006	€20.7m
Morris Tribunal	concerning some Gardaí of the Donegal Division	Frederick Morris	28 March 2002	28 March 2002	24 April 2002	June 2004–September 2008 (8 volumes)	€70-72m (Note: 2011 projection)
Smithwick Tribunal	whether Irish officials colluded in the murder of two RUC officers on 20 March 1989	Peter Smithwick	23 March 2005	24 March 2005	31 May 2005	3 December 2013	€12m (Note: 2013 projection)
Disclosures Tribunal	Garda whistleblower scandal	Peter Charleton	16 February 2017	16 February 2017	17 February 2017	TBD	TBD

== Other inquiries ==
Non-tribunal official inquiries, and subsequent reports, include:

- 2005–2007: Commission of Investigation: Dublin and Monaghan Bombings 1974 (Sole Member: Patrick MacEntee)
- 2005: the Travers Report into overcharging of fees at some nursing homes. Between refundable fees and legal costs the Tribunal's findings would cost €500 million.
- 2005: the Ferns Report on clerical sexual abuse in the Irish Catholic Diocese of Ferns, County Wexford
- 2008: the Baker–Tilly Report into procurement practices at Córas Iompair Éireann
- 2000–2009 The Ryan Report (CICA) on child abuse at religiously run institutions
- 2006–2009: The Murphy Report on the Sexual abuse scandal in Dublin archdiocese

== Bibliography ==
- MacCarthaigh, Muiris (2005). "6: Tribunals of inquiry and judicial accountability". Accountability in Irish Parliamentary Politics. Institute of Public Administration. pp. 187–237. ISBN 9781904541318.
- "Tribunals of Inquiry". Citizens Information. Citizens Information Board. 15 September 2009.
- Report on Public Inquiries including Tribunals of Inquiry (PDF). Law Reform Commission Reports. Vol. LRC 73-2005. Dublin: Law Reform Commission. 2005.
- "Special Report: Tribunals of Inquiry" (PDF). Comptroller and Auditor General. December 2008.
- Reports of particular tribunals of inquiry, listed in the "Report laid" column of the table above.
- Oireachtas debates
