= Comcast Int. Holdings v Minister for Public Enterprise & ors and Persona Digital Telephony Ltd v Minister for Public Enterprise & ors =

Irish Supreme Court case

Comcast Intl Holdings v Minister for Public Enterprise & ors
- Coat of arms of Ireland
- Court: Supreme Court of Ireland
- Full case name: Comcast Intl Holdings v Minister of Public Enterprise & ors
- Decided: 17/10/12
- Citation: [2012] IESC 50

Case history
- Appealed from: the High Court of Ireland
- Appealed to: the Supreme Court of Ireland

Case opinions
- very brief summary.
- Decision by: Denham CJ
- Concur/dissent: CJ Denham, Hardiman J, Fennelly J, McKechnie, Clarke J

Keywords
- The Moriarty Tribunal, Delay, right to a fair trial

Comcast Int. Holdings v Minister for Public Enterprise & ors and Persona Digital Telephony Ltd v Minister for Public Enterprise & ors [2012] IESC 50 is an Irish Supreme Court case which originated from the controversial decision of Michael Lowry, then Minister for Public Enterprise, to grant the second state mobile phone license to ESAT Digiphone. It has been described as "an absolutely unique case without any precedent in the ninety year history of the state."

== Background ==
=== Facts of the case ===
In March 1995, Lowry announced a bidding process for the award of the second state mobile phone license. Denis O' Brien's consortium, ESAT Digiphone was the successful candidate in the bidding process and was granted the license the following year. The award of the license was a highly lucrative business venture and made the successful bidder one of the wealthiest entities in the State. The consortium was subsequently sold a short time later for 2.3 billion euro. The tender process for the state mobile phone license was both extremely expensive to participate in and complex in nature. All tenders for the license were to be evaluated by the "GSM Project Group" which was created by the Public Service to prevent political interference. The government created a complex algorithm to evaluate applicants.

The plaintiffs in this case issued legal proceedings on the grounds that the tender process for the license had been corrupted by Michael Lowry, then Minister for Public Enterprise to ensure the award of the license was granted to ESAT. It was also alleged that Michael Lowry had been promised monetary payments from Mr O'Brien if he secured the license. The controversy arising from this decision became the subject of a public inquiry known as the Moriarty Tribunal which was set up to investigate allegations of ministerial corruption and payments made to politicians. It was found by the Tribunal that Michael Lowry through his position as Minister for Public Enterprise at the time had imparted substantive information to Denis O' Brien which was "of significant value and assistance to him in securing the license."

High Court Judgment

The appellants issued legal proceedings to the High Court in 2001. The appellants sought both a declaration from the court that the decision by Michael Lowry to award ESAT the license was null and void and damages. The State filed its own motions seeking an order to dismiss the proceedings against the Minister for delay/ and want of prosecution. It was held by the High Court judge that the delay on the part of the appellants in issuing legal proceedings was inordinate and inexcusable and that there was no justification for it:

"I come to the conclusion that where responsibility for inordinate and inexcusable delay rests with the appellants..... where the appellants have failed after a late start to advance their proceedings expeditiously, the balance of justice favors the dismissal of proceedings and I dismiss the appellants proceedings against the state for want of prosecution."

The appellants appealed this judgment to the Supreme Court.

== Holding of the Supreme Court ==
The appeals were presided over by panel of five judges. All five justices agreed that they would allow the appeals of the appellants. In addition, the Court refused to grant the relief sought by the government to strike out the proceedings on the grounds of delay (also called "want of prosecution"). The Court held that the delay on the part of the appellants in the proceedings was justified. It was also held that the decision by Mr Lowry to award the state mobile phone license to ESAT was "unlawful, null void and of no effect."

Hardiman J in his judgement stressed the singular nature of the case in that a public administrative process which had been created for the sole purpose of preventing political interference had effectively been corrupted:

"The principal relevant unique factor is that Dail Éireann and the Taoiseach, decided to set up a Tribunal of Inquiry which itself decided to investigate the very matter which is at the heart of these proceedings, the award of the second mobile phone licence. Its inquiry was estimated to be capable of concluding in one year: in fact it took thirteen times that long."

== Subsequent developments ==
In November 2019, Mr Justice Senan Allen issued a judgement stating that the documents of correspondence between O'Brien and his associates in relation to the award of the second state mobile phone license to ESAT Digiphone in 1996 must be disclosed as part of the legal action. The case has since been adjourned to allow the parties to consider his decision.
