= Pádraig Flynn =

Irish former politician and EU Commissioner (born 1939)

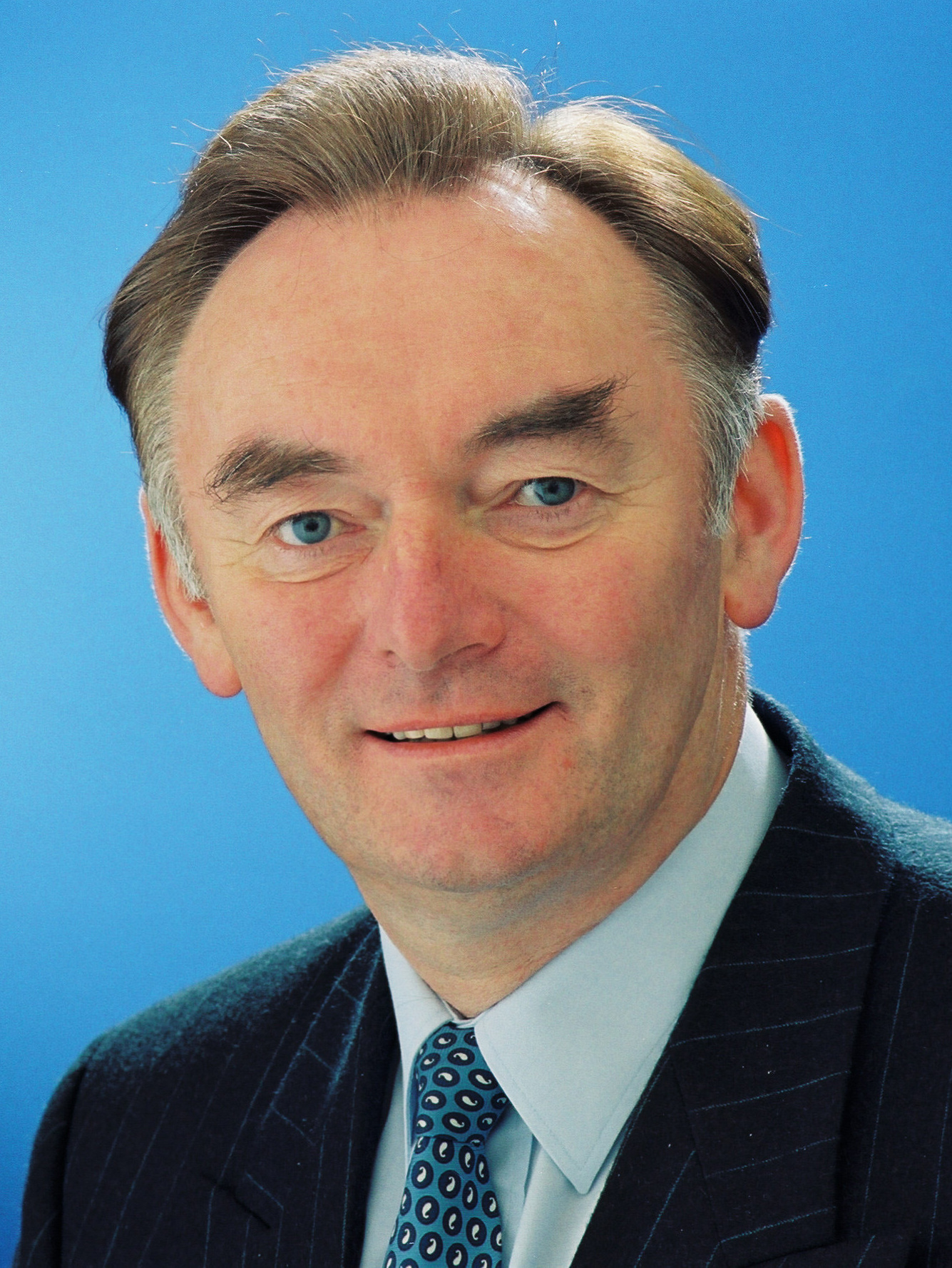
- Flynn in 1994

European Commissioner for Social Affairs
- In office 1 February 1993 – 12 September 1999
- President: Jacques Delors; Jacques Santer
- Preceded by: Vasso Papandreou
- Succeeded by: Anna Diamantopoulou

Minister for Industry and Commerce
- In office 5 November 1992 – 4 January 1993
- Taoiseach: Albert Reynolds
- Preceded by: Desmond O'Malley
- Succeeded by: Bertie Ahern

Minister for Justice
- In office 11 February 1992 – 4 January 1993
- Taoiseach: Albert Reynolds
- Preceded by: Ray Burke
- Succeeded by: Máire Geoghegan-Quinn

Minister for the Environment
- In office 10 March 1987 – 3 April 1991
- Taoiseach: Charles Haughey
- Preceded by: John Boland
- Succeeded by: John Wilson

Minister for Trade, Commerce and Tourism
- In office 11 October 1982 – 14 December 1982
- Taoiseach: Charles Haughey
- Preceded by: Paddy Power
- Succeeded by: Frank Cluskey

Minister for the Gaeltacht
- In office 9 March 1982 – 11 October 1982
- Taoiseach: Charles Haughey
- Preceded by: Paddy O'Toole
- Succeeded by: Denis Gallagher

Minister of State
- 1980–1981: Transport

Teachta Dála
- In office June 1977 – 12 June 1994
- Constituency: Mayo West

Personal details
- Born: 9 May 1939 (age 87) Castlebar, County Mayo, Ireland
- Party: Fianna Fáil (until 2012)
- Spouse: Dorothy Flynn (m. 1971)
- Children: 4, including Beverley
- Education: St Patrick's College, Dublin

Pádraig Flynn (born 9 May 1939) is an Irish former Fianna Fáil politician who served as European Commissioner for Social Affairs from 1993 to 1999, Minister for Industry and Commerce and Minister for Justice from 1992 to 1993, Minister for the Environment from 1987 to 1991, Minister for Trade, Commerce and Tourism from October 1982 to December 1982, Minister for the Gaeltacht from March 1982 to October 1982 and Minister of State at the Department of Transport from 1980 to 1981. He served as a Teachta Dála (TD) for the Mayo West constituency from 1977 to 1994.

== Early life ==
Flynn was born in Castlebar, County Mayo, in 1939. He is the son of Patrick and Anne Flynn. He was educated in St. Gerald's College, Castlebar and qualified as a primary school teacher from St Patrick's College of Education in Dublin. His mother owned a small shop in Castlebar. He was married in 1963, to Dorothy and they have four children, one son and three daughters. One daughter, Beverley Flynn was also a Fianna Fáil politician.

He first held political office in 1967, when he became a member of Mayo County Council. Ten years later, at the 1977 general election, he was elected to Dáil Éireann as a Fianna Fáil TD for the Mayo West constituency. On the day the 21st Dail convened in Leinster House, Frank Dunlop described Flynn's encounter with the then Taoiseach Jack Lynch:

There was a particular hullabaloo as a man in a white suit and polka-dot shirt was shouldered to the front door. "Who in the name of God is that?" asked an incredulous Lynch. "That," I said, "is the one and only Pádraig Flynn from Mayo" ... Though he would never have believed it that day, Jack was looking at one of those who would soon change the profile, and in some instances, the nature of Fianna Fáil for ever.

He was known by the nickname "Pee Flynn" or "Pee Flynnstone", as popularised by Dermot Morgan".

== Ministerial career ==
Flynn was a supporter of Charles Haughey in the 1979 Fianna Fáil leadership contest. His loyalty was rewarded when he became a Minister of State at the Department of Transport and Power. Flynn joined the Cabinet for the first time following the February 1982 general election, when he was appointed Minister for the Gaeltacht. In October 1982, in a minor reshuffle, he became Minister for Trade, Commerce and Tourism. However, his time in this office was brief, since Fianna Fáil lost the November 1982 general election.

Fianna Fáil was returned to power in the 1987 general election and Flynn became Minister for the Environment. Two years later he opposed the formation of the coalition government with the Progressive Democrats, describing it "as hitting at Fianna Fáil core values." In 1990, he attacked the opposition presidential candidate Mary Robinson on a radio show, accusing her of "having a new-found interest in her family" for the purposes of her election campaign. This attack backfired drastically, causing many women who initially supported Lenihan to back Robinson. Lenihan's campaign never recovered, and Robinson became Ireland's first female President. In 2010 the Irish Independent listed Flynn's diatribe against Robinson as one the biggest gaffes in Irish political history.

In 1991, Flynn was sacked from the Cabinet because of his support for a motion of no confidence in the Taoiseach, Charles Haughey. Then in 1992, Albert Reynolds became Taoiseach and Flynn was rewarded for supporting Reynolds by becoming Minister for Justice. In 1993, he retired from domestic politics when he was appointed Ireland's European Commissioner. He was reappointed by the Fine Gael-Labour Party government in 1995 and, on both of these occasions, served in the social affairs portfolio.

== The Late Late Show controversy ==
On 15 January 1999, Flynn made comments on a live chat show (The Late Late Show) regarding businessman Tom Gilmartin and a donation of IR£50,000 to the Fianna Fáil party. On the same programme, following a question by journalist Barry O'Halloran on EC Commissioners' remuneration, Flynn described his salary and lifestyle as a European Union Commissioner as being "about IR£140,000, paying 33% tax, which works out to IR£100,000 net. [...] It's a well-paid job." He said the position meant he had the added expense of maintaining three houses, cars, and housekeepers and regular travel, and described the hassle involved. The performance was seen as eccentric and out of touch at a time when house prices were rising significantly.

The show's presenter Gay Byrne then asked Flynn if he knew of Gilmartin. Flynn responded that he knew him well. Flynn seemed to be making an attack of Gilmartin's emotional stability, stating that "He's not well", based on the effect of sickness of Gilmartin's wife. If it was to be interpreted as an attack of Gilmartin's credibility, then it backfired in a spectacular manner against Flynn. Also, unknown to Flynn, Gilmartin was watching The Late Late Show on Tara Television at his home in Luton. This hurt Gilmartin a great deal, while also bringing the illness of his wife into the picture as the real driving force behind Gilmartin's testimony against Flynn. Gilmartin responded by releasing details of meetings he held with Flynn to the McCracken Tribunal.

The interview is widely described as the end of Flynn's political career.

== Retirement from politics ==
Flynn's second term as European Commissioner ended early in September 1999, when the entire commission resigned due to allegations of malpractice by the European Parliament. He was not reappointed to the commission and retired from politics completely. He is a member of the Comite d'Honneur of the Institute of International and European Affairs. Flynn's daughter Beverley Flynn is a former Fianna Fáil TD for the Mayo constituency. She was readmitted to the party on 8 April 2008, having previously been expelled after failing in a libel action against RTÉ which claimed she was involved in selling bogus non-resident accounts to customers while she worked for National Irish Bank.

He receives annual pension payments of €87,129 from his time as a TD and Minister, but this does not include payments for his time as a European Commissioner.

=== Mahon Tribunal report ===
Flynn was cited in the Mahon Tribunal for having received money from Frank Dunlop intended for Fianna Fáil, but diverted to Flynn's personal use. On 22 March 2012, the final report of the Mahon Tribunal was published. It found that Flynn "wrongly and corruptly" sought a substantial donation from Tom Gilmartin for the Fianna Fáil party. It also found that having been paid IR£50,000 by Gilmartin, for that purpose, Flynn proceeded to use that money for his personal benefit, and that the donation funded at least a significant portion of the purchase of a farm in County Mayo.

Flynn had to pay nearly IR£23,000 to the Revenue Commissioners from the IR£50,000 he got from Tom Gilmartin in 1989.

Flynn made his first public appearance since the publication of the Mahon Report by attending noon Mass in the Holy Rosary Church in Castlebar.

=== Resignation from Fianna Fáil ===
On 26 March 2012, facing expulsion following the Mahon Tribunal, Flynn resigned in disgrace from Fianna Fáil before he could be ousted.

== See also ==
- Deposit interest retention tax (DIRT)

Political offices
New office	Minister of State at the Department of Transport; 1980–1981	Office abolished
Preceded by Paddy O'Toole	Minister for the Gaeltacht; Mar.–Oct. 1982	Succeeded by Denis Gallagher
Preceded by Paddy Power	Minister for Trade, Commerce and Tourism; Oct.–Dec. 1982	Succeeded by Frank Cluskey
Preceded by John Boland	Minister for the Environment; 1987–1991	Succeeded by John Wilson
Preceded by Ray Burke	Minister for Justice; 1992–1993	Succeeded by Máire Geoghegan-Quinn
Preceded by Desmond O'Malley	Minister for Industry and Commerce; 1992–1993	Succeeded by Bertie Ahern
Preceded by Ray MacSharry	Irish European Commissioner; 1993–1999	Succeeded by David Byrne

Dáil	Election	Deputy (Party)	Deputy (Party)	Deputy (Party)
19th	1969	Mícheál Ó Móráin (FF)	Joseph Lenehan (FF)	Henry Kenny (FG)
20th	1973	Denis Gallagher (FF)	Myles Staunton (FG)	Henry Kenny (FG)
20th	1975 by-election	Denis Gallagher (FF)	Myles Staunton (FG)	Enda Kenny (FG)
21st	1977	Denis Gallagher (FF)	Pádraig Flynn (FF)	Enda Kenny (FG)
22nd	1981	Denis Gallagher (FF)	Pádraig Flynn (FF)	Enda Kenny (FG)
23rd	1982 (Feb)	Denis Gallagher (FF)	Pádraig Flynn (FF)	Enda Kenny (FG)
24th	1982 (Nov)	Denis Gallagher (FF)	Pádraig Flynn (FF)	Enda Kenny (FG)
25th	1987	Denis Gallagher (FF)	Pádraig Flynn (FF)	Enda Kenny (FG)
26th	1989	Martin O'Toole (FF)	Pádraig Flynn (FF)	Enda Kenny (FG)
27th	1992	Séamus Hughes (FF)	Pádraig Flynn (FF)	Enda Kenny (FG)
27th	1994 by-election	Séamus Hughes (FF)	Michael Ring (FG)	Enda Kenny (FG)
28th	1997	Constituency abolished. See Mayo		
