= Colm Mac Eochaidh =

Irish judge

The Hon. Mr. Justice Colm Mac Eochaidh

Judge of the General Court of the European Union
- Incumbent
- Assumed office 8 June 2017
- Nominated by: Government of Ireland
- Appointed by: European Council

Judge of the High Court
- In office 23 July 2012 – 24 April 2017
- Nominated by: Government of Ireland
- Appointed by: Michael D. Higgins

Personal details
- Born: 1963 (age 62–63) Dublin, Ireland
- Education: University College Dublin; King's Inns

Colm Mac Eochaidh (born 1963) is an Irish judge who has served as a Judge of the General Court of the European Union since June 2017. He previously served as a Judge of the Irish High Court from 2012 to 2017.

He was educated at Coláiste Eoin, University College Dublin and King's Inns. He qualified as a barrister in 1987 and was made a Senior Counsel in 2009. He was appointed to the High Court in 2012.

In 1995, he and Michael Smith, the head of the environmental group An Taisce, sponsored a IR£10,000 reward for "information leading to the conviction on indictment of a person or persons for offences relating to land rezoning in the Republic of Ireland”. They had been prompted to put up the reward after suspicions about the rezoning of land in Loughlinstown in 1991. James Gogarty, a retired employee of construction firm JSME, responded with information about payments to Ray Burke, a Government Minister and former chairman of Dublin County Council. Following Burke's resignation from the cabinet, the Mahon Tribunal was set up. Initially set up to investigate illegal payments received by Burke, the tribunal ran from November 1997 to March 2012 investigating a number of cases arising from payments made to Burke.

A former member of Fine Gael, in the 2002 Irish general election he unsuccessfully ran in the constituency of Dublin South-East, as a running mate to sitting Fine Gael TD Frances Fitzgerald.
