= Tom Gilmartin (businessman) =

Irish whistleblower (1935–2013)

- Born: Thomas Patrick Gilmartin; 11 March 1935; County Sligo, Ireland
- Died: 22 November 2013 (aged 78); County Cork, Ireland
- Occupation: Businessman
- Known for: Involvement in Mahon Tribunal

Tom Gilmartin (11 March 1935 – 22 November 2013) was an Irish businessman, whistleblower and pivotal Mahon Tribunal witness whose testimony concerning planning and political corruption "rocked Ireland". He played a crucial role in ending the political career of former Taoiseach Bertie Ahern.

== Biography ==
Originally from County Sligo, Gilmartin grew up on a small farm at Lislary, near Grange. He left Ireland for England in 1957 and developed a mechanical engineering business in Luton serving local car makers such as Vauxhall Motors. Often wrongly referred to as a builder, Gilmartin had never been involved in building, but had a great talent for putting together development schemes in the United Kingdom and introducing institutional investment to get them off the ground.

== Property development and corruption ==
Motivated by concern that beggars in the UK were Irish like himself, he returned to Ireland in the late 1980s to create local jobs. In Ireland he encountered corruption from politicians while attempting to create 20,000 jobs through the development of two shopping areas in the Bachelors Walk and Quarryvale areas of Dublin, the latter of which subsequently became the Liffey Valley Shopping Centre, a development which bears no relation to the multi-purpose retail, technology, and social development envisaged by Gilmartin. Gilmartin was subjected to demands for money by politicians, and was repeatedly obstructed when he refused to pay them. Politicians and the public relations industry attempted to discredit him when he tried to speak out. Comparing the Fianna Fáil political party to the Mafia, Gilmartin found himself under threat, "You could end up in the [River] Liffey for that statement." This incident followed a meeting Gilmartin was invited to with the then Taoiseach, Charles Haughey and several Cabinet colleagues in Leinster House. After the meeting, which was denied by all bar one of those who met him, a demand was made for IR£5 million, which Gilmartin refused. Gilmartin, when he returned to give evidence, was dismissed and ridiculed by a succession of those present, and was subjected to a very hostile cross-examination by lawyers for the then-current Taoiseach, Bertie Ahern. However, the meeting was very clearly recalled by former Cabinet minister Mary O'Rourke (herself ostracised by some party colleagues as a result), thus proving Gilmartin correct.

After being forced by AIB Bank to cede control of 60% of his development company to them and Cork developer Owen O'Callaghan, Gilmartin's experience became even worse. Gilmartin suspected O'Callaghan's associate, Frank Dunlop, as being a conduit for payments to politicians, the latter paid to stall the rezoning of the lands Gilmartin had assembled until he had handed over control. Contemporaneous bank memorandums and multiple witnesses attested to Gilmartin's complaints of corruption, particularly in relation to large round-figure, invoiceless and VAT-free payments to a company called Shefran Ltd., payments to which Gilmartin repeatedly queried and received no answers (it later becoming apparent that it was merely a cover for payments to Dunlop to disperse to politicians). The Tribunal report found that AIB were fully aware of, and facilitated, these payments, yet were complicit in keeping Gilmartin in the dark. Gilmartin was made bankrupt in the United Kingdom. It was subsequently established by the Tribunal that two IR£10,000 payments, one to McGrath, and one to Liam Lawlor, were written up in O'Callaghan's accounts as 'expenses', and subsequently falsely written up in the accounts of the company he shared with Gilmartin as Gilmartin's own expenses, Gilmartin being expected to fund expenses they knew he would never have sanctioned.

== Return to Britain ==
Gilmartin returned to Britain after his forced exit from his own project. However, false allegations made by former government minister and European Union Commissioner Pádraig Flynn against Gilmartin's mental health while Flynn appeared on The Late Late Show live on RTÉ Television led to Gilmartin's agreement to co-operate with the Mahon Tribunal. Gilmartin exposed the corrupt former Government Press Secretary, Frank Dunlop, who Gilmartin always suspected of being a bag-man for corrupt payments from developers to politicians. It was Gilmartin's evidence which led to Dunlop being forced to admit his role in a corruption ring on Dublin County Council, with several politicians being paid for their votes in favour of, or against, rezoning of lands in County Dublin. His testimony was instrumental in exposing the former Assistant City and County Manager, George Redmond, and the powerful West Dublin TD, Liam Lawlor, both of whom obstructed his project when he refused their demands for money. Gilmartin's testimony included allegations that the then Taoiseach Bertie Ahern had taken money from Cork developer Owen O'Callaghan (leading to Ahern's appearance before the Tribunal, and subsequent resignation) and that Flynn had tried to have Gilmartin give an IR£50,000 cheque to the Fianna Fáil political party to stop the activities of corrupt officials and politicians trying to thwart Gilmartin after he refused to pay them. Gilmartin had already gone to the Gardái, who were found to have told him to 'F*** off back to England', and later admitted not even questioning those named by Gilmartin because they were politicians. He had also complained to government ministers and Dublin Corporation officials, but had received little help, except requests for donations to the governing party, Fianna Fáil, which Gilmartin had repeatedly refused until he realised that he was set to lose everything. Thus, under much pressure, he relented, and gave a cheque to Flynn, then the Fianna Fáil Treasurer, for the party. The donation, which was meant for Fianna Fáil, was later found not to have been passed on to the party by Flynn.

Gilmartin was subjected to an unprecedented campaign of vilification by government ministers, prominent journalists and commentators, and wealthy business interests, when he returned to Ireland to give evidence to the Mahon Tribunal about his experiences in trying to get his development off the ground. The stress sustained contributed to him needing quadruple bypass surgery. The Tribunal found his evidence to be truthful, and accepted that much of what he alleged was, in fact, true. The final Tribunal report was held to be a complete vindication of him, despite the efforts of powerful people to portray him as a malevolent fantasist.

Gilmartin moved to County Cork, where he died as a result of heart failure in November 2013. Hundreds turned out in Grange, County Sligo, and at Urris, County Donegal, to pay their respects.

== See also ==
- Politics of the Republic of Ireland

== Reading Source ==
Connolly Frank, Gilmartin, Gill & Macmillan, Dublin 12, 2014, ISBN 978-0-7171-6047-1
