= Mahon Tribunal =

Inquiry into political corruption in Ireland

- Date: 4 November 1997 – 22 March 2012
- Location: Dublin, Ireland
- Also known as: Tribunal of Inquiry into Certain Planning Matters and Payments; Flood Tribunal
- Participants: Judge Alan Mahon; Judge Feargus Flood; Judge Mary Faherty; Judge Gerald Keys
- Website: www.planningtribunal.ie

The Tribunal of Inquiry into Certain Planning Matters and Payments, commonly known as the Mahon Tribunal after the name of its last chairman, was a public inquiry in Ireland established by Dáil Éireann in 1997 to investigate allegations of corrupt payments to politicians regarding political decisions. It mostly investigated planning permissions and land rezoning issues in the 1990s in the Dublin County Council area. Judge Alan Mahon was the final chair of the tribunal and its other members were Judge Mary Faherty and Judge Gerald Keys. The original chairman, who was the sole member until just before his retirement, was Judge Feargus Flood, giving rise to the original common name of the Flood Tribunal.

Using investigations to collect evidence and public hearings with witnesses, it investigated allegations made in the media prior to its establishment and allegations subsequently made to the tribunal itself. The tribunal ran from November 1997 to March 2012 and was the longest running and most expensive public inquiry held in the Republic of Ireland, with costs forecast to reach between €250 million and €300 million. Public hearings concluded in September 2008, and following several delays due to legal challenges, the tribunal began preparing its final report. It published four interim reports, and the final report was published on 22 March 2012. On 2 April 2008, then-Taoiseach Bertie Ahern resigned due to continuing controversy over the payments.

== Background ==
=== Loughlinstown ===
Loughlinstown was, prior to 1990 a scenic area directly south of Dublin city on the Wexford road, site of the first dual carriageway in Ireland. In 1991, an intensive IR£800,000 public relations (PR) campaign to generate local support for the rezoning of hundreds of acres in Loughlinstown and nearby Cabinteely was spearheaded by public relations consultant and sports broadcaster Bill O'Herlihy and later by PR consultant and former political secretary Frank Dunlop. Some councillors firmly resisted the rezoning, supposedly concerned about the commercial and social welfare of nearby Dún Laoghaire but are alleged to have ensured that there was sufficient support from colleagues whose political bases were elsewhere. The rezoning was approved.

Fianna Fáil politician Liam Lawlor was presented at a public meeting concerning nearby Cherrywood as his party's "planning expert".

=== £10,000 reward ===
There had long been speculation about the extent of corruption underlying these planning decisions, and there had been several Gardaí inquiries in the 1980s and 1990s but these failed to uncover evidence.

In 1995 Michael Smith, later to become chairman of environmental body An Taisce, and Colm Mac Eochaidh, a barrister later to be a Fine Gael candidate in Dublin South-East in the 2002 general election and a judge of the High Court and the General Court, co-sponsored a £10,000 reward for information leading to convictions for planning corruption.

James Gogarty, a retired employee of construction firm JSME, responded with information about payments to Ray Burke, a government minister and former chairman of Dublin County Council.

== Establishment ==
During the formation of the new Ahern Government in June 1997, questions about the suitability of the appointment of Burke as a minister were raised. Ahern asked Dermot Ahern to investigate, and defended Burke, saying "I've looked up every tree in North Dublin". Burke was appointed to the Government but resigned in September following further public revelations and questions. This increased pressure on the Government to investigate. The tribunal was formally established on 4 November 1997 to investigate the Gogarty allegations, and also any acts related to planning processes which might have involved corruption.

The terms dictated that the Tribunal would enquire into payments to Ray Burke in the course of his long political career and examine the decisions he had made in broadcasting as well as in planning.

The government had just months earlier also established the separate Moriarty Tribunal to investigate payments to politicians Charles Haughey and Michael Lowry.

== Modules ==
The Tribunal has organised its investigations into discrete modules:

- The Carrickmines I Module / Jackson Way, 20 November 2002 – 16 December 2003
- The Fox and Mahoney Module, 24 October 2003 – 4 December 2003
- The St Gerard's Bray Module, 24 October 2003 – 4 December 2003
- The Carrickmines II Module and related issues 20 January 2004 – 13 February 2004
- The Carrickmines II Module, Phase 2, Coolamber lands – witness examination pending
- The Arlington / Quarryvale I Module, 3 March 2004 – July 2004
- The Quarryvale II Module (hearings adjourned until further notice pending outcome of High Court application)
- The Cherrywood Module, May 2006 – ?
- The Walls'/Kinsealy Module, July 2006
- The Lissenhall Module, September 2006
- The alleged payment of £10,000 in cash by Frank Dunlop to councillors in respect of the rezoning of land at Cargobridge, close to Dublin Airport, 19 September 2006. The rezoning proposal, for industry and air freight warehousing, was passed by a 51–0 in March 1993 despite strong opposition from Aer Rianta.

== Witnesses ==
In the course of its investigations, the tribunal has communicated with and cross-examined in public hundreds of witnesses. Among the most notable were:

=== James Gogarty ===
One of the leading witnesses in the early days was James Gogarty. Gogarty, born in Kells, County Meath was of advanced age at the start of the Tribunal. For this reason, the evidence from Gogarty was of concern, from the beginning, in case his health failed. Gogarty was a former Garda. He then trained as an Engineer, worked as a foreman, before being promoted as a long-term executive at construction company Joseph Murphy Structural Engineers (JMSE) who had responded to the 1995 reward offer stating that he had witnessed a bribe of £30,000 being paid in cash to Minister Burke. Gogarty, by now in dispute with his former employers, claimed the payment was in seeking Burke's influence to secure approval to rezone 726 acres (2.94 km^{2}) of land at several locations in north Dublin, including Finglas, Ballymun, Balgriffin, Portmarnock and Donabate. The lands in questions were the subject of a joint development involving JMSE, Michael Bailey, and his brother Tom Bailey. Gogarty also provided evidence of payments to George Redmond, Dublin Corporation manager. Gogarty was outspoken in his criticism of his employers, several politicians, and the entire planning process. The Irish Independent referred to Gogarty's courage, in calling him "the plucky pensioner". Gogarty received much support from the public gallery during his participation in the Tribunal. Gogarty died on 15 September 2005, aged 88.

=== Ray Burke ===
The Tribunal's inquiries between 1997 and 2002 comprised what were in effect three Public Inquiries, that covered topics as diverse as land rezoning, radio broadcasting and offshore trusts and corporations.

The Tribunal reported in September 2002 that the payments received by Burke amounted to corrupt payments. The Report also cited witnesses who obstructed and hindered its work over the prior five years.

- Burke did not purchase his home, Briargate, in 1973 as a normal commercial transaction but a benefit conferred to ensure that Burke would act in the best interests of Oakpark Developments when performing his public duties.
- Burke opened and maintained offshore bank accounts in the Isle of Man for the purpose of receiving and concealing corrupt payments.
- Burke received a corrupt payment of £35,000 on 26 May 1989 in connection with the granting of a broadcasting license to Century Radio.
- The payment to Burke on 15 June 1989 which James Gogarty witnessed was not a political donation but was paid to secure Burke's political support and was a corrupt payment

=== George Redmond ===
George Redmond was Assistant City and County Manager at Dublin Corporation in 1988. A planning application had been lodged with Dublin County Council on 1 October 1982 to build 206 houses at Forrest Road, Swords. A 5-year Planning Permission was approved.

James Gogarty deposed on 12 October 1998 that Redmond had received payments from Mr Joseph Murphy. The Tribunal investigated these payments and concluded.:

- That Redmond devised a strategy which resulted in the service charge and levies payable upon the development of lands at Forrest Road being fixed at their 1983 level for a period of two years after the expiry of the Planning Permission on 21 June 1988
- Redmond demanded 10% of the savings achieved by following his strategy as payment for his services
- If a new planning application was made without his assistance, the service charges and levies would be fixed at least 100% more than those fixed in 1983.
- That Redmond received a payment of no less than £12,246 for his service from Murphy and this was a corrupt payment
- Murphy paid Redmond £15,000 at Clontarf Castle Hotel in July 1989 as compensation for not appointing him as a consultant to the Murphy landowning companies after his retirement from Dublin County Council but this was not a corrupt payment
- Michael Bailey made 3 cash payments to Redmond in the 18 months prior to July 1989 and these were corrupt payments.
- That Redmond hindered and obstructed the Tribunal

The finding of corruption by the Planning Tribunal was withdrawn in the High Court by the Tribunal on 19 December 2014

=== Bertie Ahern ===
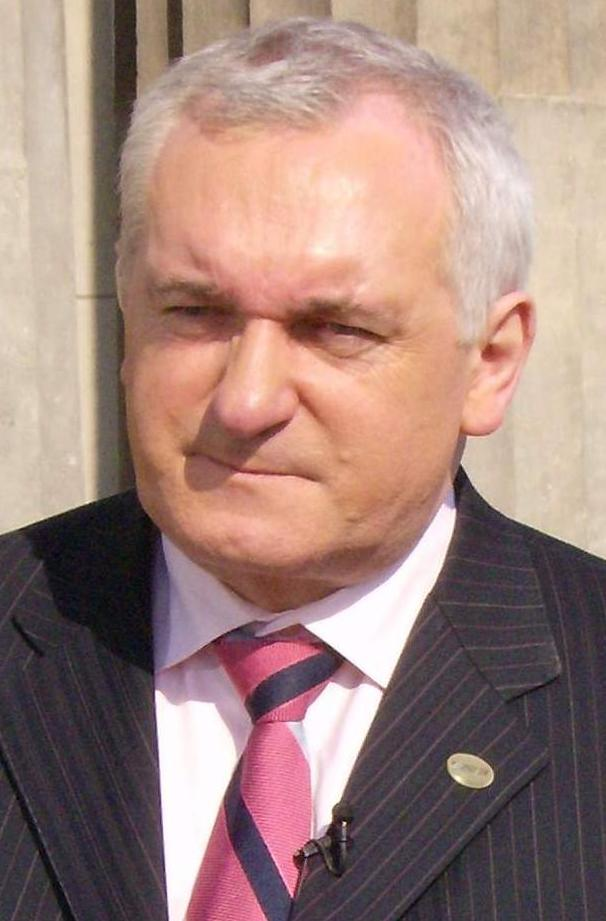
Evidence produced during the Mahon Tribunal would ultimately force the resignation of Bertie Ahern as Taoiseach of Ireland

Following allegations that he had received payments from developer Owen O'Callaghan, the tribunal began an investigation of the finances of then Taoiseach Bertie Ahern. Ahern and O'Callaghan denied that any such payments had taken place. Details of specific transactions under investigation were leaked to the press and questions were asked in the Dáil. During a September 2006 interview with RTÉ's Bryan Dobson Ahern denied that he had received any illegal payments and claimed that some of the transactions related to unsolicited dig-outs from friends during his legal separation proceedings in 1993 and 1994. Further transactions relating to the purchase of his house and foreign currency conversions became public during the lead up to the 2007 general election. The tribunal postponed sittings for the duration of the campaign. Ahern was re-elected Taoiseach and attended the tribunal for witness questioning in September and December 2007 and February 2008.

During a heated exchange between Ahern and Judge Mahon on 22 February 2008, Ahern stated that his former partner, Celia Larkin, received a loan of IR£30,000 from a special Fianna Fáil fundraising account to buy a house. After the exchange, opposition leaders called for the Taoiseach's resignation. On 20 March Ahern's former secretary, Gráinne Carruth, was forced, on evidence presented to her by the tribunal, to accept as a matter of probability that a lodgement of 15,000 pounds she had made into an account on Ahern's behalf had been in sterling. This directly contradicted to Ahern's previous assertion that the money was from his salary. Carruth had also broken down while making this admission, whereas she had previously backed up Ahern's testimony, provoking condemnation of Ahern for betraying her loyalty by forcing her to go through with her appearance. On 2 April, Ahern announced his intention to resign from the position of Taoiseach, effective 6 May 2008.

=== Other witnesses ===
- Frank Dunlop, PR adviser who in 2000 on the advice of Mr. Justice Flood reflected overnight on his evidence and on the following day began to reveal the monies he had paid to various politicians on behalf of his clients, developers seeking rezoning. He was brought to the attention of the Tribunal by Tom Gilmartin, who alleged that he was a bag-man for developers looking to pay bribes to corrupt politicians in return for favours, an allegation Dunlop denied until he realised he could not credibly explain away his expenditure for so much money after the Tribunal produced evidence of an undisclosed account he held in Terenure. His evidence was central to the tribunal findings of corruption, though there are doubts about the veracity of the evidence he has given since his 2000 revelations.
- Liam T. Cosgrave, former Fine Gael politician, who admitted he had received payments from Frank Dunlop. His case is going through the courts.
- Liam Lawlor, former Fianna Fáil politician
- Property developers, such as Tom Gilmartin, the Bailey Brothers, Joseph Murphy, Oliver Barry
- Various Dublin local councillors
- Pádraig Flynn regarding IR£50,000 received from Tom Gilmartin who claimed it was for Fianna Fáil not Flynn personally.
- Ann Devitt a Fine Gael councillor in Fingal, acted on behalf of builder Joe Moran in 2002, and received €20,000. She was chair of the health board when the developer needed road access through health board lands for development of land for industry at Lissenhall.
- Fine Gael TD Olivia Mitchell was found to have received an inappropriate payment of £500 from Frank Dunlop.
- The former Ceann Comhairle Seán Barrett, TD was cleared of any wrongdoing after the Tribunal of enquiry.

== Outcomes ==
=== Corruption findings against councillors ===
Findings of corruption were made against 11 councillors, due to court proceedings only 6 were named Fianna Fáil's Pat Dunne (Deceased), Finbarr Hanrahan, Cyril Gallagher and G. V. Wright, Fine Gael's Tom Hand, Labour's John O'Halloran.

=== Prison sentences ===
George Redmond and Ray Burke have served prison sentences for tax evasion. Liam Lawlor has served three prison sentences for non-co-operation.

=== Tax yields ===
The Tribunal had cost the State €21 million by 2002 but €34.5 million was recovered by the Revenue Commissioners and the Criminal Assets Bureau.

The Bailey brothers and their company, Bovale Developments reached a settlement with the Revenue Commissioners in respect of PAYE, PRSI, Corporation Tax and Income Tax in 2006.

=== Jackson Way assets ===
The Criminal Assets Bureau successfully obtained a High Court order on 26 July 2006 freezing land assets of 107 acres (0.43 km^{2}) at Carrickmines, County Dublin owned by Jackson Way Properties Ltd and preventing their sale. CAB contended that these lands had been rezoned by a 13–11 vote on 16 December 1997 by Dún Laoghaire–Rathdown County Council from agricultural to industrial after Frank Dunlop bribed and made corrupt payments to councillors to secure their support in the rezoning vote. That vote, for example, increased the value of just 17 acres (69,000 m^{2}) of the property from €8 million to €61 million. CAB interviewed and took statements from Frank Dunlop with the intention of using him as a witness against a number of property developers.

The lands in question were the subject of investigation by the Tribunal in 2003 and 2004.

=== Reports and findings ===
The inquiry published four interim reports, confirming corruption in the planning process, before its final report.

==== First interim report ====
The first Interim report lays out the work of the Tribunal for the coming years. It was published just after the Flood Tribunal began its work.

==== Second interim report ====
The second Interim Report was published in September 2002. It reported findings related to the first three modules, Gogarty, McGowan and Century Radio/Ray Burke. It is the most substantial of the reports thus far, and caused massive controversy at the time of its publication.

==== Third interim report ====
The third Interim Report of the Tribunal was published on 30 September 2002 by Mr Justice Fergus Flood. It deals mainly with the activities of George Redmond.

==== Fourth interim report ====
The fourth Interim report informed the Oireachtas of the extent of the workload of the Tribunal and its likely duration, to inform the Oireachtas of the Tribunal's respectful request for amendments to the current Terms of Reference and to inform the Oireachtas of other matters related to the work of the Tribunal which the Tribunal deems may be relevant to the Oireachtas.

==== Final report ====
The final report was published on 22 March 2012. The Irish Government then referred the 3,270-page report to the Garda Commissioner, the director of public prosecutions, the revenue commissioners and to the Standards in Public Office Commission. On corruption in public life, Judge Mahon stated in the report that: "It continued because nobody was prepared to do enough to stop it. This is perhaps inevitable when corruption ceases to become an isolated event and becomes so entrenched that it is transformed into an acknowledged way of doing business. Specifically, because corruption affected every level of Irish political life, those with the power to stop it were frequently implicated in it."

It found that former Taoiseach Bertie Ahern failed to "truthfully" explain source of money and it rejected his evidence of "dig-outs", and that former EU commissioner Pádraig Flynn "wrongly and corruptly" sought donation from Tom Gilmartin. It stated that a decision in 1992 by Pat Rabbitte, then a Democratic Left TD, to return a donation of IR£2,000 to Frank Dunlop was "commendable and correct".

Five councillors are specifically named as having received corrupt payments. These are Fianna Fáil councillors Tony Fox, Colm McGrath, Don Lydon and G. V. Wright; and Fine Gael's Tom Hand.

It established that Davy Stockbrokers, throughout the 1980s and 1990s, made a series of payments to the corrupt politician Liam Lawlor.

In 1993, the Taoiseach Albert Reynolds and Bertie Ahern, who was then Minister for Finance, wrote to developer Owen O'Callaghan seeking a substantial donation. At the time O'Callaghan was heavily involved in lobbying for state support for a stadium project at Neilstown, County Dublin. According to the report, O'Callaghan felt compelled to donate a sum of IR£80,000 to Fianna Fáil in order to get funding for the stadium. The Mahon Tribunal said it did not find the payment to be corrupt. However, the report said pressurising a businessman to donate money when he was seeking support for a commercial project was "entirely inappropriate, and was an abuse of political power and government authority".

The main recommendations of the report are: more robust whistleblower legislation; a new planning regulator to give direction to local and regional planning authorities; new limits on political donations; a new register of lobbyists; expanded disclosure requirements for public officials; and a ban on members of the Oireachtas who are convicted of bribery from holding public office.

=== Fallout of final report ===
After the publication of the final report, Fianna Fáil sought to expel any of its members that were found to have received corrupt payments. Bertie Ahern, Pádraig Flynn, G. V. Wright, Don Lydon, Finbarr Hanrahan and John Hannon all resigned from Fianna Fáil before they could be expelled. Fine Gael Councillor Anne Devitt said she was stepping aside from her party, while it carries out its own internal inquiries into the tribunal's findings.

== See also ==
- Public inquiries in the Republic of Ireland
- Brian McCracken (McCracken Tribunal)
- Moriarty Tribunal
