= Lowry Tapes =

The Lowry Tapes refers to a 2013 scandal in Ireland involving the Tipperary North TD Michael Lowry, formerly a Fine Gael government minister. They feature a telephone conversation between Lowry and the land agent Kevin Phelan. The conversation featured foul language and reference to an undeclared payment of €250,000. It is believed to date from 30 September 2004 and raised uncertainty over whether Lowry had misled the Moriarty Tribunal which had previously investigated him.

Much of the controversy focused on the following comments by Lowry:

I'm asking you, Kevin, for fuck's sake will you protect me just a small bit. For jaysus sake don't land me in it. I'm destroyed as it fucking is. … I can't bring out that 200 – that 250 – again. If that comes out again I'm fucking ruined, I'm bankrupt. … They can't find that 200. I never declared it.

Now, the 2500 – the 250 – that I gave you, I paid that directly. I never put that through my books or my account of anything, nobody's going to fucking get it, so I've got, you, know, I mean, I'm not even bringing that into it.

Journalist Michael Clifford, writing in the Irish Examiner, drew comparisons between the response - or lack thereof - from the Irish government and the British government's past responses to tamer crimes such as Jeffrey Archer's perjury and Chris Huhne's perverting the course of justice. Clifford wrote that the Lowry scandal "tells us much about what passes for democracy in this State. [It] involves prima facie evidence that at least one crime may have been committed by serving TD and former government minister, Michael Lowry. In a proper democracy [...] this would be a matter for the police."

The Sunday Independent published a transcript of the Lowry Tapes; however state broadcaster RTÉ's coverage was roundly criticised and deemed inadequate. The Sunday Independent said RTÉ's self-censorship had become the story and The Sunday Times featured a piece captioned "Our state broadcaster must learn to confront, not cower." One of the few mentions was provided by Marian Finucane, one of RTÉ's highest earners, who brushed over the Lowry Tapes in two minutes at the end of her show when one of her panelists brought up the topic. Morning Ireland preferred to focus its political coverage on what were termed more trivial topics, such as Luke 'Ming' Flanagan's driving technique and tweets by Gerry Adams.

On 14 March 2013, the Lowry Tapes were broadcast in full on national television, on the TV3 programme Tonight with Vincent Browne.

On 9 May 2013, Taoiseach Enda Kenny responded to "real concern" among the public over the Lowry Tapes but said he would not reopen the Moriarty Tribunal.

== See also ==
- Corruption in Ireland
