= Don Lydon =

Irish psychologist and politician (born 1938)

Senator
- In office 25 April 1987 – 13 September 2007
- Constituency: Labour Panel

Personal details
- Born: 7 August 1938 (age 87) Dublin, Ireland
- Party: Fianna Fáil
- Education: University College Galway; University College Dublin; Trinity College Dublin

Donal John Lydon (born 7 August 1938) is an Irish psychologist and former politician. He was a Fianna Fáil member of Seanad Éireann from 1987 to 2007, elected on the Labour Panel.

== Professional career ==
Lydon was born in Dublin, and was educated at St Eunan's College in Letterkenny, County Donegal; University College Galway; University College Dublin and Trinity College Dublin. His bachelor's degree was in sociology and English; his postgraduate work was in the area of education and psychology. Lydon has also worked as a consulting psychologist. For a number of years, he was a non-executive director of Connsbrook Productions Limited and a non-executive of Corona Holidays Limited in Dublin.

He has published a number of papers in professional journals, mostly in the area of alcoholism or psychopathology in adolescents.

Lydon was awarded a Council of Europe Medical Fellowship in 1977 in order to go abroad to study "Residential Treatment of Disturbed Adolescents". He was the first psychologist in Ireland to receive such a fellowship.

== Political career ==
He was a member of Dublin County Council from 1985 to 1993 and was a member of Dún Laoghaire–Rathdown County Council from 1994 to 2002. He was first elected to Seanad Éireann in 1987 and was elected at all subsequent elections until his defeat at the 2007 election. He has at various times been the Senior Senate Spokesman on Justice, Senior Senate Spokesman on the Department of the Taoiseach and European Affairs, Senior Senate Spokesman on European Affairs, and laterally held the position of Spokesman on Foreign Affairs with Special Responsibility for Overseas Development Assistance and Human Rights.

He has served as a member of the Joint Parliamentary Committee on Women's Rights, the Joint Services Committee, the Joint Parliamentary Committee on Social, Community and Family Affairs and was laterally a member of the Joint Parliamentary European Affairs Committee.

In February 1993, during a meeting in the council chamber of Dublin Corporation, he famously grabbed the Green Party TD Trevor Sargent in a headlock when Sargent waved a cheque, sent to him by a builder. Sargent asked the rest of the council had they been sent any checks, and if they thought that this was a case of the building sector attempting to bribe the council.

Lydon was nominated as a candidate for the 23rd Seanad in 2007 and stood as a member of Fianna Fáil. His proposers included Senator Tom Morrissey, former Fianna Fáil Senator Margaret Cox and Fianna Fáil TD Ned O'Keeffe. He lost his Seanad seat in the 2007 election.

He was a member of the Irish Council of the European Movement and served as vice-chairman from 1991 to 1993. He was also a member of both the Council and Executive of The Institute of European Affairs.

== Bribery investigation ==
The Criminal Assets Bureau secured a freezing order from the High Court on 26 July 2007 based on its investigation of corruption in respect of bribes allegedly paid to councillors by Frank Dunlop to secure the rezoning on 16 December 1997 by Dún Laoghaire–Rathdown County Council of 107 acres (0.43 km^{2}) of land assets owned by Jackson Way Properties at Carrickmines. This rezoning was investigated by the Mahon Tribunal in 2003. Lydon stood charged with corruption following his district court appearance on Friday 22 October 2010 along with 3 other former FF councillors. The charges were dropped after a medical condition prevented Dunlop from giving his full testimony.

== Senate expense claims ==
In 2004, Lydon changed his place of residence from Dublin to Donegal to qualify for a different travel and subsistence rate, despite living and working in Dublin. Lydon's yearly claim for travel and subsistence varied from €37,000 to €39,000 during the years 2004 to 2006, (in 2007 he claimed €24,000 as he only worked for 7 months). It has been reported that there will not be an investigation into his expenses as "there is no provision for looking into the expenses claims of former members of the Oireachtas"

On 27 March 2012, after being named in the final report of the Mahon Tribunal for receiving corrupt payments, Lydon resigned from Fianna Fáil before he could be expelled.
