= Senan Allen =

Irish barrister, Court of Appeal judge since 2022

The Hon. Mr. Justice Senan Allen

Judge of the Court of Appeal
- Incumbent
- Assumed office 24 June 2022
- Nominated by: Government of Ireland
- Appointed by: Michael D. Higgins

Judge of the High Court
- In office 4 October 2018 – 24 June 2022
- Nominated by: Government of Ireland
- Appointed by: Michael D. Higgins

Personal details
- Education: University College Dublin; King's Inns

Senan Allen is an Irish lawyer who has been a judge of the Court of Appeal since June 2022. He was formerly a barrister and was a judge of the High Court between 2018 and 2022.

== Education ==
Allen attended University College Dublin, graduating in 1981 with a BCL degree.

== Legal career ==
He was called to the Bar in 1983 and became a senior counsel in 2000. His practice was focused on chancery law and commercial litigation.

In 2015, Allen was appointed to undertake a review of allegations made by a whistleblower relating to the Oireachtas Committee of Inquiry into the Banking Crisis. His report concluded that no misconduct took place at the inquiry.

== Judicial career ==
=== High Court ===
Allen was nominated as a judge of the High Court in July 2018 and was appointed in October 2018.

He has heard cases involving property law, defamation, insolvency, European Arrest Warrants, contract law, election law, injunctions, judicial review, probate law, child law, and company law. In proceedings related to Comcast Int. Holdings v Minister for Public Enterprise & ors and Persona Digital Telephony Ltd v Minister for Public Enterprise & ors he permitted discovery of documents related to the Esat Digifone licence controversy.

Since 2019 he is a member of a committee of the Judicial Council relating to personal injuries guidelines. He was the judge in charge of the Chancery list of the High Court as of 2021.

=== Court of Appeal ===
He was nominated to the Court of Appeal in April 2022 and was appointed in June 2022.
