= Esat Digifone licence controversy =

It is alleged that as a result of benefits extended to Michael Lowry by Denis O'Brien that Esat Digifone was given an unfair advantage in the procurement of a mobile phone operator's licence.

The Moriarty Tribunal found evidence of collusion between Lowry and O'Brien: "There are three significant findings which are largely beyond dispute. They are:

- Denis O’Brien gave substantial sums of money to Fine Gael in order to make friends with people in the party.

This happened at a time when Fine Gael was in government and O’Brien was seeking a government decision in his favour.

- Michael Lowry sought to be involved, to a greater or lesser degree, in the licensing process, seeking information about it on a number of occasions
- Denis O’Brien, or persons close to him, subsequently sought to give large amounts of money to Michael Lowry."
