= Mary Faherty =

Irish judge (born 1960)

The Hon. Ms. Justice Mary Faherty

Judge of the Court of Appeal
- Incumbent
- Assumed office 4 November 2019
- Nominated by: Government of Ireland
- Appointed by: Michael D. Higgins

Judge of the High Court
- In office 30 October 2014 – 4 November 2019
- Nominated by: Government of Ireland
- Appointed by: Michael D. Higgins

Judge of the United Nations Appeals Tribunal
- In office 28 January 2011 – 30 June 2016
- Nominated by: Government of Ireland
- Appointed by: United Nations General Assembly

Judge of the Circuit Court
- In office 21 June 2002 – 30 October 2014
- Nominated by: Government of Ireland
- Appointed by: Mary McAleese

Personal details
- Born: Mary Faherty; 16 January 1960 (age 66) Galway, Ireland
- Education: University College Galway; University of Freiburg; University College Dublin; King's Inns

Mary Faherty (born 16 January 1960) is an Irish judge who has served as a Judge of the Court of Appeal since November 2019. She previously served as a Judge of the High Court, a Judge of the United Nations Appeals Tribunal from 2011 to 2016 and a Judge of the Circuit Court from 2002 to 2014.

She began her career as a barrister and served as the Chairperson of the Employment Appeals Tribunal. She was subsequently appointed to the bench of the Circuit Court and the Mahon Tribunal, before being elevated to the High Court. She was a member of the United Nations Appeals Tribunal between 2011 and 2016, serving as its president from 2013 to 2014.

== Early career ==
Faherty was born in 1960. She first studied a BA in German and Legal Science at University College Galway, graduating in 1982, and spent the academic year between 1980 and 1981 undertaking German Studies at the University of Freiburg. She subsequently obtained an LLB from UCG in 1984. The university awarded her its award for Law, Public Service and Government in 2006. She attended the King's Inns and was called to the Bar in 1986. She undertook further study at University College Dublin in arbitration.

She became a Senior Counsel in 2001 and was also called to the Bar of England and Wales in 1996.

She joined the Employment Appeals Tribunal in 1989 as a Vice Chairperson, becoming the chairperson in 1995. She was reappointed in 1998 to serve a five-year term through to 2002.

== Judicial career ==
=== Circuit Court ===
Faherty was appointed to the Circuit Court in 2002. She became a judge in order to sit as a member of the Tribunal of Inquiry Into Certain Planning Matters and Payments. Her, Gerald Keys and Alan Mahon's appointments required the law to be changed to increase the number of Circuit Court judges. In 2007, while serving on the Tribunal, she noted that Taoiseach Bertie Ahern had provided "polar opposite" explanations of why he withdrew £50,000 from an account. The final public sitting of the Tribunal was in December 2008.

=== United Nations Appeals Tribunal ===
She joined the United Nations Appeals Tribunal in January 2011 and was Second Vice President between 2012 and 2013. She subsequently served as the President of the Tribunal between July 2013 and June 2014. She completed her term on the Tribunal in 2016.

=== High Court ===
She was appointed to the High Court in October 2014. She heard cases involving receivership, damages claims, actions under the Aarhus Convention, and a challenge to the constitutionality of a Central Bank of Ireland inquiry.

=== Court of Appeal ===
Following a change of legislation to increase the number of judges of the Court of Appeal, Faherty was nominated to be elevated to that court in 2019. She was appointed in November 2019.
