= Pearse Street =

Street in central Dublin, Ireland

- South Brunswick Street
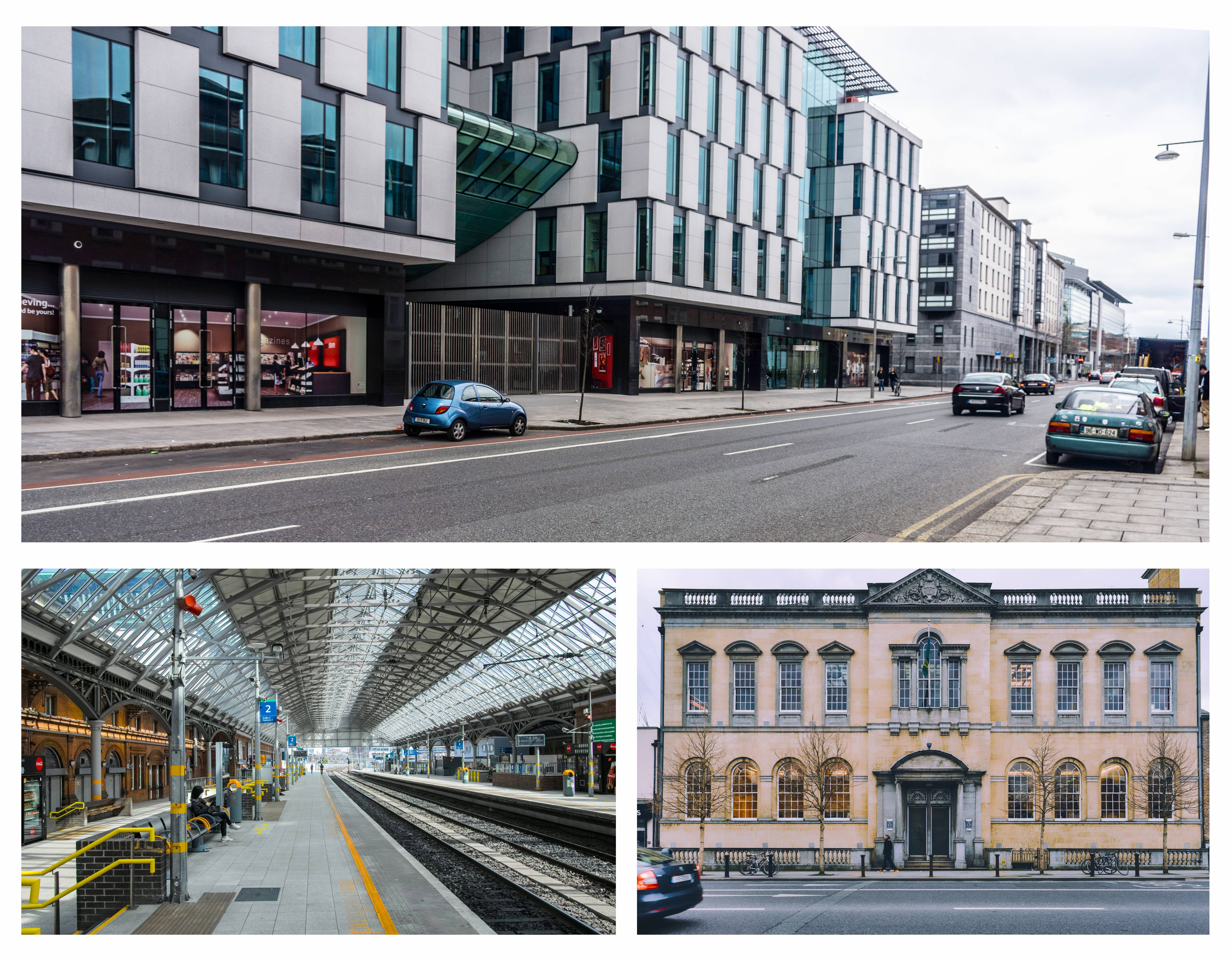
- Clockwise from top: Trinity Central; the Gilbert Library; Pearse Street Station interior

- Location within Central Dublin
- Native name: Sráid an Phiarsaigh (Irish); Sráid na bPiarsach (Irish)
- Former name: Great Brunswick Street
- Namesake: Patrick Pearse and Willie Pearse
- Length: 1.3 km (0.81 mi)
- Width: 25 metres (82 ft)
- Postal code: D02
- Coordinates: 53°20′40″N 6°15′04″W
- west end: College Street
- east end: Grand Canal Row, MacMahon Bridge

Construction
- Inauguration: 1795

Other
- Known for: Science Gallery, Pearse workshop, Dublin Fire Brigade, Department of Social Protection

Pearse Street (Irish: Sráid an Phiarsaigh) is a major street in Dublin. It runs from College Street in the west to MacMahon Bridge in the east, and is one of the city's longest streets. It has several different types of residential and commercial property along its length.

== History ==
The street is named after the Irish revolutionaries, Patrick Pearse and his brother William. It first appears as Moss Lane, then Channel Row. It was constructed to connect the city centre to the Grand Canal Dock, primarily for commercial traffic. It was named Great Brunswick Street for the House of Brunswick, holders of the British and Irish crown from 1714 to 1901.

The Dublin Oil Gas Company was established in 1824 with its main premises on Great Brunswick Street. This eventually became the Academy Cinema. The Brunswick and Shamrock Pneumatic Cycle Factory was at No. 2. The Lyceum Theatre planned to build a new building on Great Brunswick Street at its junction with Tara Street. Plans were submitted in 1884 for a 2,500-capacity venue, but this was later abandoned.

The 1936 Pearse Street fire at number 164, then the Exide Batteries factory, killed three Dublin firefighters. A plaque marks the site of the building.

== Properties ==
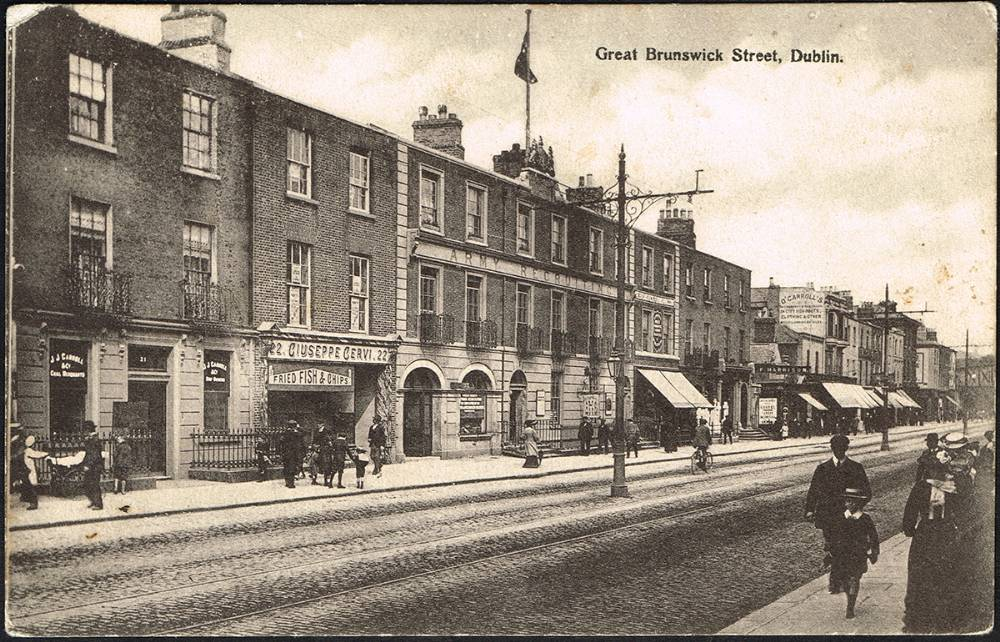
A view of the street in the early 20th century.

The western end of Pearse Street meets College Street near Townsend Street. Here, on the northern side, there is a Garda station, faced with Leinster granite from Ballybrew and designed by Andrew Robinson in the Scottish Baronial style and featuring "keystone cops" in the form of carved heads of policemen as corbels. It opened in 1912. This is followed by the old headquarters of the Dublin Fire Brigade at the Central Fire Station, which opened on 13 December 1907. The building was designed by C. J. McCarthy in an Italian-Romanesque style in red brick and cost £21,840. The premises closed in 1988, and was later converted into apartments and a hotel. Office buildings are on the southern side of the street, followed by Trinity College. The offices of the Department of Social Protection are on the site of the Queen's Theatre, Dublin. Another building of note is O'Neill's Pub, at No. 37, which dates from the 1850s and was still in the same ownership as of the 2000s.

St. Mark's church was constructed in 1729 in a classical style. It was purchased by Trinity College in 1971 and used as an additional library premise. It was sold to the Assemblies of God in 1987 and was renovated in the early 21st century as part of a FÁS-backed youth training scheme. It is the oldest building on the street.

The DART crosses Pearse street beside St. Mark's, and east of that is the former Antient Concert Rooms where W. B. Yeats's play The Countess Cathleen was first performed on 8 May 1899 and James Joyce won an award for singing at the Feis Ceoil 16 May 1904. No. 43 is the former Erasmus Smith Commercial and Civil Service School, a bank and pub bracket the junction with Lombard Street, with Trinity College and the railway station and Goldsmith Hall opposite each other on Westland Row.

St Andrew's Resource Centre is at Nos. 114-116 and provides various adult education programmes and daycare for the elderly. It originally opened as a Roman Catholic school in 1897, accommodating 1,200 children. The school closed in 1972 and reopened in its current form in 1989.

Further east along the street is the Pearse Street Public Library at Nos. 138-144, which has supported the Gilbert Library, a research facility, and the City Archives, on its first floor since 2003. The building was designed by C. J. McCarthy and opened in 1909. It is constructed from Mount Charles sandstone and Ballinasloe limestone and built in a classical style. The building has been modified several times and was extensively redesigned internally to support the City Archives.

Beyond the library, the street becomes residential. The Winter Garden is a set of apartments on the corner of Pearse Street and Erne Street. It was designed by Paul O'Dwyer and opened in 1999 and designed around a glazed internal street. Shortly beyond this is Pearse Square (formerly Queen Square). The square was constructed in 1839 but was slow to develop; there is still an undeveloped plot at the south-east end by Pearse Street.

The eastern extent of Pearse Street holds the Gallery Quay apartments and MacMahon Bridge at Grand Canal Dock, where numerous high-tech offices and high-rise apartment buildings can be found, in an area sometimes dubbed Silicon Docks. The street becomes Ringsend Road, and later Bridge Street around Ringsend Bridge, on its continuation into Dublin 4.

The Cuban embassy is located on this street within the Westland Square premises at number 32.

The Royal Irish Yacht Club had premises on Clarendon Buildings, Great Brunswick Street from the early 1830s prior to their move to Kingstown.

== People ==
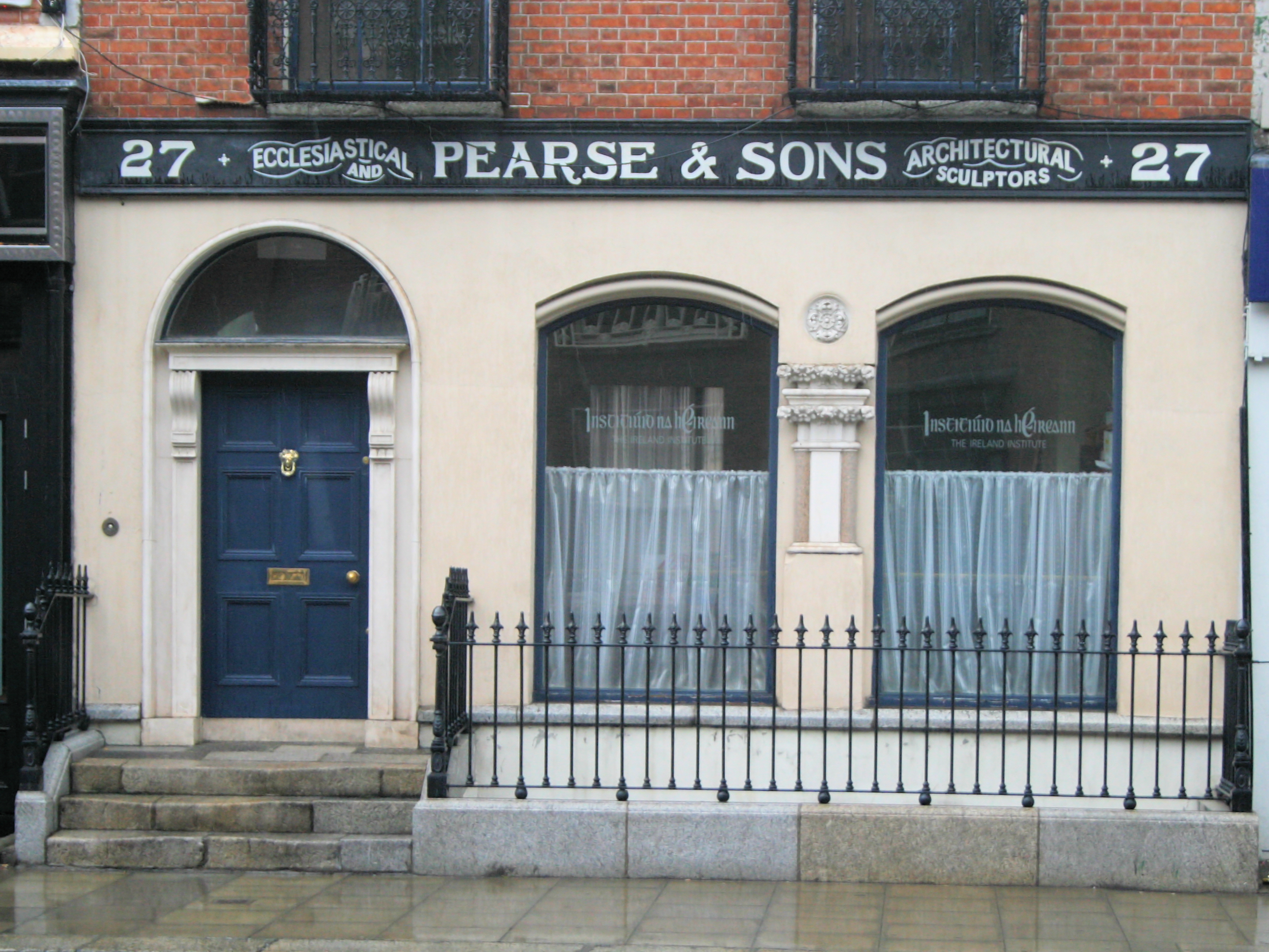
No. 27 Pearse Street, birthplace of Patrick and Willie Pearse

Patrick Pearse (also known as Padraig), one of the executed leaders of the 1916 Rising, was born at No. 27 Great Brunswick Street on 10 November 1879. His father James established an ecclesiastical architecture and sculpture firm (fashioning stone and marble altars and gravestones) at the site. The original house still stands as a memorial, while the Trinity City Hotel occupies the back garden.

Architect Thomas Francis McNamara had offices at No. 192 Great Brunswick Street from 1911 to 1927.

Oscar Wilde was baptised at St Mark's in 1854.

== See also ==
- List of streets and squares in Dublin
