= Pearse Street fire =

1936 fire in Dublin, Ireland

Coordinates: 53.3438°N 6.2487°W

The Pearse Street fire was a conflagration in Pearse Street, Dublin on 5 October 1936, in which three firemen died. The fire began at No.163 Pearse Street sometime after 8.30 pm and spread next door to No.164. The alarm was raised at 10.50 pm and the Dublin Fire Brigade from the Tara Street station arrived on the scene at 11.12, ensured the buildings were evacuated and began fighting the blaze. The water pressure at the nearest fire hydrants was inadequate and three firemen went onto the flat roof of No.165 while colleagues connected their hose to a farther hydrant. While they waited, two explosions were caused by the fire igniting cylinders of coal gas and oxygen stored at No.163 by a company which manufactured car batteries. This engulfed the three men and strengthened the blaze, which burned itself out the following morning. The bodies of the firemen were recovered that evening; they had died of carbon monoxide poisoning. A tribunal of inquiry was established by order of the Oireachtas, which criticised the fire brigade supervisors, the water company, and the battery company. The cause of the initial fire was not established; the inquiry ruled out arson and felt a discarded cigarette was the most likely explanation.

A memorial plaque to the three firemen was unveiled at the site in 2008, by which date it remained the Dublin Fire Brigade's worst loss of life.
