= Feargus Flood =

Irish judge (1928–2022)

Judge of the High Court
- In office 30 July 1991 – 20 January 2000
- Nominated by: Government of Ireland
- Appointed by: Mary Robinson

Personal details
- Born: 2 July 1928 Ballybofey, County Donegal, Ireland
- Died: 10 September 2022 (aged 94) Whitehall, Dublin, Ireland
- Spouse: Anna Maria Carloni (m. 1963)
- Children: 3
- Education: University College Dublin; King's Inns

Feargus Michael Flood (2 July 1928 – 10 September 2022) was an Irish judge who served as a Judge of the High Court from 1991 to 2000. He chaired the Flood Tribunal which investigated allegations of corrupt payments to politicians.

== Early life ==
Flood was born in Ballyshannon, County Donegal in 1928. The son of a banker, he was educated at Castleknock College, University College Dublin and King's Inns.

== Legal career ==
Flood spent the earlier parts of his legal career practising as a junior and senior counsel in Monaghan, Cavan and Dundalk.

== Judicial career ==
He was appointed to the bench of the High Court in 1991. Flood became chairman of the Planning and Payments Tribunal in November 1997. Known as the Flood Tribunal, it was originally set up to probe allegations of corruption against former Fianna Fáil Minister Ray Burke but was extended to cover alleged corruption involving land developers and Dublin politicians as well as former assistant Dublin city and county manager George Redmond. Flood stepped down as chairman in 2003.

== Personal life and death ==
Flood met his future wife, Anna Maria, on a holiday in Italy. They married in 1963 and had three children. Flood suffered from Alzheimer's disease in later life and died on 10 September 2022, at the age of 94.
