= Ray Burke (Irish politician) =

Irish former politician (born 1943)

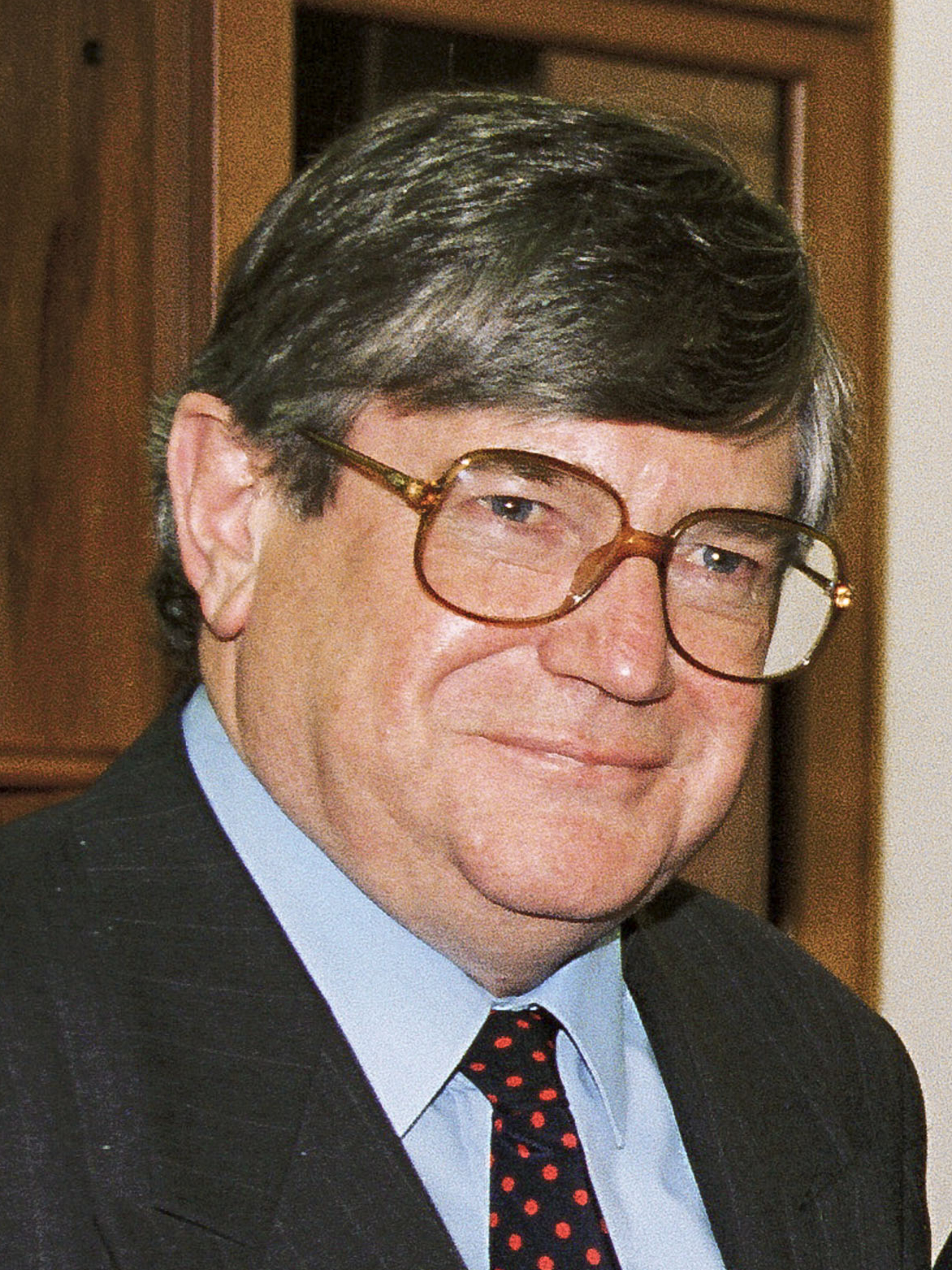
- Burke in 1995

Minister for Foreign Affairs
- In office 26 June 1997 – 7 October 1997
- Taoiseach: Bertie Ahern
- Preceded by: Dick Spring
- Succeeded by: David Andrews

Minister for Justice
- In office 12 July 1989 – 11 February 1992
- Taoiseach: Charles Haughey
- Preceded by: Gerry Collins
- Succeeded by: Pádraig Flynn

Minister for Communications
- In office 31 March 1987 – 6 February 1991
- Taoiseach: Charles Haughey
- Preceded by: John Wilson
- Succeeded by: Séamus Brennan (Tourism, Transport and Communication)

Minister for Industry and Commerce
- In office 24 November 1988 – 12 July 1989
- Taoiseach: Charles Haughey
- Preceded by: Albert Reynolds
- Succeeded by: Desmond O'Malley

Minister for Energy
- In office 10 March 1987 – 24 November 1988
- Taoiseach: Charles Haughey
- Preceded by: Michael Noonan
- Succeeded by: Michael Smith

Minister for the Environment
- In office 9 March 1982 – 14 December 1982
- Taoiseach: Charles Haughey
- Preceded by: Peter Barry
- Succeeded by: Dick Spring
- In office 15 October 1980 – 30 June 1981
- Taoiseach: Charles Haughey
- Preceded by: Sylvester Barrett
- Succeeded by: Peter Barry

Minister of State
- 1978–1980: Industry, Commerce and Energy

Teachta Dála
- In office June 1981 – 7 October 1997
- Constituency: Dublin North
- In office February 1973 – June 1981
- Constituency: Dublin County North

Personal details
- Born: Raphael Patrick Burke; 30 September 1943 (age 83) Swords, County Dublin, Ireland
- Party: Fianna Fáil
- Spouse: Margaret Hillery (m. 1975)
- Children: 4
- Parent: Patrick Burke (father)
- Education: University College Cork

Raphael Patrick Burke (born 30 September 1943) is an Irish former Fianna Fáil politician who served as Minister for Foreign Affairs from June 1997 to October 1997, Minister for Justice from 1989 to 1992, Minister for Communications from 1987 to 1991, Minister for Industry and Commerce from 1988 to 1989, Minister for Energy from 1987 to 1988, Minister for the Environment from March 1982 to December 1982 and 1980 to 1981 and Minister of State at the Department of Industry, Commerce and Energy from 1979 to 1980. He served as a Teachta Dála (TD) from 1973 to 1997.

== Early life ==
Burke was born in Dublin. He was educated at O'Connell School, and he went on to study at University College Cork, before becoming an auctioneer. Burke's political career commenced when he was elected to Dublin County Council for Fianna Fáil in 1967. He was chairman of the council from 1985 to 1987.

== Career ==
Burke was elected to Dáil Éireann at the 1973 general election for the Dublin County North constituency, succeeding his father Patrick Burke, who had held the seat for 29 years. Ray Burke represented this constituency and its successor Dublin North until his resignation almost twenty-five years later.

After Fianna Fáil's landslide victory at the 1977 general election, Burke was appointed Minister of State at the Department of Industry and Commerce. He supported George Colley in the Fianna Fáil leadership contest of 1979, but after Colley's opponent Charles Haughey won out, Haughey retained Burke in his government position. Burke was subsequently a staunch and vocal defender of Haughey during several internal heaves against the latter's leadership of the party. In October 1980, Burke was promoted to Minister for the Environment, a position he held until June 1981 and again in the short-lived Fianna Fáil government of 1982. After Fianna Fáil returned to power at the 1987 general election, Burke served as Minister for Energy, where he made controversial changes to the legislation governing oil and gas exploration. In 1988, he was appointed Minister for Industry, Commerce and Communications.

Following the formation of the Fianna Fáil–Progressive Democrats coalition in 1989, he was appointed as Minister for Justice and Minister for Communications in the government of Charles Haughey. When Albert Reynolds succeeded Haughey in 1992, he did not re-appoint Burke to the cabinet. Following the 1997 general election, Fianna Fáil was back in office, and Burke was appointed Minister for Foreign Affairs, by Taoiseach Bertie Ahern.

== Corruption allegations ==
Within months of his appointment as Minister for Foreign Affairs, allegations resurfaced that Burke had received IR£80,000 from a property developer regarding the former Dublin County Council. Burke denied the allegations but resigned from the cabinet and the Dáil, on 7 October 1997, after just four months in office. This allegation led to the setting up of the Planning Tribunal chaired by Justice Feargus Flood. In an interim report of the Tribunal, Flood judged Burke to be "corrupt".

After Burke's re-election in 1989, he had made it clear in interviews that he believed that RTÉ, the national broadcaster, was biased against him and Fianna Fáil in its election coverage, and several RTÉ employees reported that while off-air at RTÉ's election coverage, he remarked "I'm going to fucking screw RTÉ". After the election he was appointed Minister for Justice, while retaining the Communications brief.

Burke was responsible for controversial legislation that severely limited RTÉ's ability to collect advertising revenue and allowed for the establishment of a series of local radio stations and one independent national radio station, Century Radio. RTÉ were ordered to provide a national transmission service for Century Radio at a price that RTÉ complained was far below the economic cost of providing such a service. For example, they were required by the service level agreement to have engineers on standby covering the entire country 24 hours a day, when the final payment for the entire transmission service was roughly equal to the salary for just one engineer.

Nevertheless, Century Radio failed to gain a significant audience share and closed in 1991. An interim report of the Flood Tribunal found as fact that the backers of Century Radio had paid large bribes to Burke to secure favourable ministerial decisions. One of the local stations established was 98FM and in 2006 its owner, businessman Denis O'Brien won a record €750,000 damages from the Irish Daily Mirror which had claimed that O'Brien had paid a bribe of IR£30,000 to Burke to secure a licence for the station.

== Prison time ==
In July 2004, Burke pleaded guilty to making false tax returns. The charges arose from his failure to declare for tax purposes the payments that he had received from the backers of Century Radio. On 24 January 2005, he was sentenced to six months in prison for these offences, making him one of the most senior Irish politicians to serve time in prison. He was released in June 2005, after four and a half months, earning a 25% remission of sentence because of good behaviour. He served his time in Arbour Hill Prison in Dublin.

== Retirement ==
Burke has maintained a low profile since completing his prison sentence but attended the state funeral of Charles Haughey in June 2006, his political patron. Several former associates of Burke, from his days as a member of Dublin County Council, continue to be the subjects of tribunals of inquiry set up to investigate irregularities in the planning process in Dublin.

Burke is entitled to two public service pensions, one as a former TD at the maximum rate for over 20 years' service, and another as a former Minister. His barrister at his 2005 sentencing hearing stated these were his only income. As well as general criticism that such pensions are overly generous, Burke's continued receipt of these pensions while in prison and after his condemnation in the Flood report attracted criticism. Their combined income value was €66,000 in 2003 and €103,838 in 2011.

== See also ==
- Mahon Tribunal
- List of members of the Oireachtas imprisoned since 1923

Political offices
New office	Minister of State at the Department of Industry and Commerce; 1978–1980	Succeeded by Denis Gallagher
Preceded by Sylvester Barrett	Minister for the Environment; 1980–1981	Succeeded by Peter Barry
Preceded by Peter Barry	Minister for the Environment; Mar. 1982–Dec. 1982	Succeeded by Dick Spring
Preceded by John Wilson	Minister for Communications; 1987–1991	Succeeded by Séamus Brennan as Minister for Tourism, Transport and Communication
Preceded by Michael Noonan	Minister for Energy; 1987–1988	Succeeded by Michael Smith
Preceded by Albert Reynolds	Minister for Industry and Commerce; 1988–1989	Succeeded by Desmond O'Malley
Preceded by Gerry Collins	Minister for Justice; 1989–1992	Succeeded by Pádraig Flynn
Preceded by Dick Spring	Minister for Foreign Affairs; Jun. 1997–Oct. 1997	Succeeded by David Andrews

Dáil	Election	Deputy (Party)	Deputy (Party)	Deputy (Party)	Deputy (Party)
19th	1969	Patrick Burke (FF)	Des Foley (FF)	Mark Clinton (FG)	Justin Keating (Lab)
20th	1973	Patrick Burke (FF)	Seán Walsh (FF)	Mark Clinton (FG)	Justin Keating (Lab)
21st	1977	Ray Burke (FF)	Joe Fox (FF)	John Boland (FG)	3 seats 1977–1981
22nd	1981	Constituency abolished. See Dublin North			

Dáil	Election	Deputy (Party)	Deputy (Party)	Deputy (Party)	Deputy (Party)	Deputy (Party)	Deputy (Party)	Deputy (Party)	Deputy (Party)
4th	1923	Alfie Byrne (Ind.)	Francis Cahill (CnaG)	Margaret Collins-O'Driscoll (CnaG)	Seán McGarry (CnaG)	William Hewat (BP)	Richard Mulcahy (CnaG)	Seán T. O'Kelly (Rep)	Ernie O'Malley (Rep)
4th	1925 by-election	Alfie Byrne (Ind.)	Patrick Leonard (CnaG)	Margaret Collins-O'Driscoll (CnaG)	Oscar Traynor (Rep)	William Hewat (BP)	Richard Mulcahy (CnaG)	Seán T. O'Kelly (Rep)	Ernie O'Malley (Rep)
5th	1927 (Jun)	Alfie Byrne (Ind.)	John Byrne (CnaG)	Margaret Collins-O'Driscoll (CnaG)	Oscar Traynor (SF)	Denis Cullen (Lab)	Richard Mulcahy (CnaG)	Seán T. O'Kelly (FF)	Kathleen Clarke (FF)
6th	1927 (Sep)	Alfie Byrne (Ind.)	John Byrne (CnaG)	Margaret Collins-O'Driscoll (CnaG)	Patrick Leonard (CnaG)	James Larkin (IWL)	Richard Mulcahy (CnaG)	Seán T. O'Kelly (FF)	Eamonn Cooney (FF)
6th	1928 by-election	Alfie Byrne (Ind.)	John Byrne (CnaG)	Margaret Collins-O'Driscoll (CnaG)	Patrick Leonard (CnaG)	Vincent Rice (CnaG)	Richard Mulcahy (CnaG)	Seán T. O'Kelly (FF)	Eamonn Cooney (FF)
6th	1929 by-election	Thomas F. O'Higgins (CnaG)	John Byrne (CnaG)	Margaret Collins-O'Driscoll (CnaG)	Patrick Leonard (CnaG)	Vincent Rice (CnaG)	Richard Mulcahy (CnaG)	Seán T. O'Kelly (FF)	Eamonn Cooney (FF)
7th	1932	Alfie Byrne (Ind.)	John Byrne (CnaG)	Margaret Collins-O'Driscoll (CnaG)	Oscar Traynor (FF)	Cormac Breathnach (FF)	Richard Mulcahy (CnaG)	Seán T. O'Kelly (FF)	Eamonn Cooney (FF)
8th	1933	Alfie Byrne (Ind.)	Patrick Belton (CnaG)	Vincent Rice (CnaG)	Oscar Traynor (FF)	Cormac Breathnach (FF)	Richard Mulcahy (CnaG)	Seán T. O'Kelly (FF)	Eamonn Cooney (FF)
9th	1937	Constituency abolished. See Dublin North-East and Dublin North-West							

Dáil	Election	Deputy (Party)	Deputy (Party)	Deputy (Party)	Deputy (Party)
22nd	1981	Ray Burke (FF)	John Boland (FG)	Nora Owen (FG)	3 seats 1981–1992
23rd	1982 (Feb)	Ray Burke (FF)	John Boland (FG)	Nora Owen (FG)	3 seats 1981–1992
24th	1982 (Nov)	Ray Burke (FF)	John Boland (FG)	Nora Owen (FG)	3 seats 1981–1992
25th	1987	Ray Burke (FF)	John Boland (FG)	G. V. Wright (FF)	3 seats 1981–1992
26th	1989	Ray Burke (FF)	Nora Owen (FG)	Seán Ryan (Lab)	3 seats 1981–1992
27th	1992	Ray Burke (FF)	Nora Owen (FG)	Seán Ryan (Lab)	Trevor Sargent (GP)
28th	1997	Ray Burke (FF)	Nora Owen (FG)	G. V. Wright (FF)	Trevor Sargent (GP)
28th	1998 by-election	Seán Ryan (Lab)	Nora Owen (FG)	G. V. Wright (FF)	Trevor Sargent (GP)
29th	2002	Seán Ryan (Lab)	Jim Glennon (FF)	G. V. Wright (FF)	Trevor Sargent (GP)
30th	2007	James Reilly (FG)	Michael Kennedy (FF)	Darragh O'Brien (FF)	Trevor Sargent (GP)
31st	2011	James Reilly (FG)	Alan Farrell (FG)	Brendan Ryan (Lab)	Clare Daly (SP)
32nd	2016	Constituency abolished. See Dublin Fingal			
