= Brian McCracken =

Irish judge (born 1934)

Judge of the Supreme Court
- In office 4 May 2002 – 12 July 2006
- Nominated by: Government of Ireland
- Appointed by: Mary McAleese

Judge of the High Court
- In office 13 March 1995 – 3 May 2002
- Nominated by: Government of Ireland
- Appointed by: Mary Robinson

Personal details
- Born: 13 August 1934 (age 91) Cork, Ireland
- Education: Trinity College Dublin; King's Inns

Brian Moore McCracken (born 13 July 1934) is a retired Irish judge who served as a Judge of the Supreme Court from 2002 to 2006 and a Judge of the High Court from 1995 to 2002. He is an officer of Trinity College Dublin – Visitor of the College.

== Early life and career ==
McCracken was born in Cork in 1934. He was educated at The High School, Dublin, and later at Trinity College Dublin and the King's Inns. He became a barrister in 1957 and a senior counsel in 1975.

== Judicial career ==
McCracken was appointed a High Court judge in 1995 and was elevated to Ireland's Supreme Court in 2002. His in-depth expertise in the field of intellectual property law was widely recognised but he also had expertise in both chancery and commercial law.

== McCracken Tribunal ==
Judge McCracken was appointed as the sole member of the McCracken Tribunal which was set up by the Bruton Government in February 1997 to investigate reports of secret payments by Ben Dunne Jnr. to former Taoiseach Charles Haughey and former cabinet Minister Michael Lowry and others.

The Tribunal heard evidence in July 1997 and produced a 100-page report the following month. This report found that Haughey had given untrue evidence under oath and that Lowry was knowingly assisted by Dunne in evading tax. As a result of the findings and revelation of substantial funds in secret Ansbacher accounts, owned by Haughey, the new Ahern Government established a more extensive follow-up, the Moriarty Tribunal to investigate the financial affairs of the two politicians.

Charles Haughey faced criminal charges for obstructing the work of the McCracken tribunal. His trial on these charges was postponed indefinitely after the judge in the case found that he would not be able to get a fair trial following prejudicial comments by Tánaiste Mary Harney.

Compared to the succeeding, and other tribunals, the McCracken Tribunal was praised for its efficiency in concluding within months.

He retired from the Supreme Court on 12 July 2006.

== See also ==
- Public inquiries in Ireland
- Tribunal
- Public Inquiry
- Beef Tribunal
- Moriarty Tribunal
- Mahon Tribunal
