= Alan Mahon (judge) =

Irish judge (born 1951)

Judge of the Court of Appeal
- In office 24 October 2014 – 6 July 2018
- Nominated by: Government of Ireland
- Appointed by: Michael D. Higgins

Judge of the Circuit Court
- In office 14 April 2002 – 20 October 2014
- Nominated by: Government of Ireland
- Appointed by: Mary McAleese

Personal details
- Born: 3 March 1951 (age 75) Tullamore, County Offaly, Ireland
- Education: University College Dublin; King's Inns

Alan Mahon (born 3 March 1951) is a retired Irish judge who served as a Judge of the Court of Appeal from 2014 to 2018 and a Judge of the Circuit Court from 2002 to 2014.

He was educated at Clongowes Wood College, University College Dublin and the King's Inns. He was called to the Bar in 1976, and to the Inner Bar in 1988.

He was appointed as a Circuit Court judge in April 2002. He was appointed as a judge of the Tribunal of Inquiry into Certain Planning Matters and Payments in September 2002 and appointed chairman of the tribunal in July 2003. In October 2014, he became a judge of the Court of Appeal.

On 24 April 2018, the Government of Ireland decided to recommend Mahon for appointment as the new Ombudsman for the Defence Forces, for a three-year period with effect from 6 July 2018. Mahon was recommended following an open competition run by the Public Appointments Service. Mahon resigned as a Judge of the Court of Appeal to take up the position, which is a non-judicial position.
