= Michael Lowry (politician) =

Irish politician (born 1953)

Michael Lowry TD
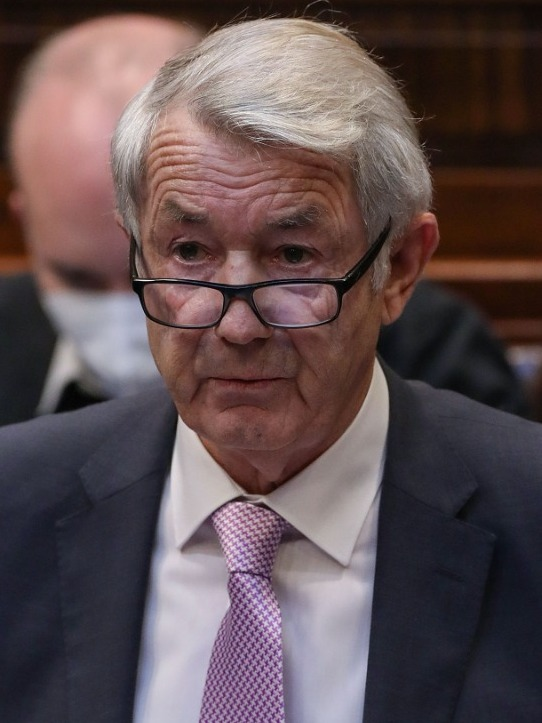
- Lowry in 2022

Teachta Dála
- Incumbent
- Assumed office November 2024
- In office February 1987 – February 2016
- Constituency: Tipperary North
- In office February 2016 – November 2024
- Constituency: Tipperary

Minister for Transport, Energy and Communications
- In office 15 December 1994 – 30 November 1996
- Taoiseach: John Bruton
- Preceded by: Brian Cowen
- Succeeded by: John Bruton

Personal details
- Born: 13 March 1953 (age 73) Thurles, County Tipperary, Ireland
- Party: Independent (since 1997)
- Other political affiliations: Fine Gael (until 1997)
- Spouse: Catherine McGrath (m. 1981, separated)
- Children: 3
- Education: CBS Thurles
- Website: michaellowry.ie

Michael Lowry (born 13 March 1953) is an Irish independent politician who has served as a Teachta Dála (TD) since 1987, currently for the Tipperary North constituency. He previously served as Minister for Transport, Energy and Communications from 1994 to 1996 and Chair of the Fine Gael parliamentary party from 1993 to 1994.

Lowry is a former chair of the Fine Gael party and was Minister for Transport, Energy and Communications between 1994 and 1996. He resigned from his ministry in some controversy. Fine Gael barred him from standing for the party again. Thereafter he ran as an Independent candidate and has maintained his seat in the Dáil ever since. The Moriarty Tribunal concluded "beyond doubt" that Lowry was a tax evader and had assisted businessman Denis O'Brien's Esat Digifone consortium in acquiring a lucrative mobile phone licence in the mid-1990s, during Lowry's time as Communications Minister. O'Brien went on to become one of the richest men in Ireland.

Lowry initiated a defamation lawsuit against an Irish Independent journalist, Sam Smyth, over an article that Smyth had written regarding the Moriarty Tribunal as well as comments that Smyth made on a TV3 show. The lawsuit was thrown out of several courts and Lowry was ordered to pay Smyth's legal costs. More recently his relationship with Kevin Phelan has come under scrutiny, with the emergence of a recorded conversation in which Lowry claims to have made an undeclared payment of €250,000.

== Early and personal life ==
Lowry was born in County Tipperary and educated at CBS Thurles. He was elected to North Tipperary County Council in 1979. In the early 1980s he was a Gaelic Athletic Association (GAA) administrator, and was the youngest-ever chair of that body's Tipperary County Board. He runs a commercial refrigeration business, Streamline Enterprises, that he founded in controversial circumstances in 1988. Later, as chair of the Semple Stadium Development Committee, he was involved in raising the necessary funds for the refurbishment of the stadium in preparation for the All-Ireland Centenary Hurling final in 1984.

He married Catherine McGrath in 1981, and they had three children. They are separated.

== National politics ==
=== Fine Gael ===
Lowry was first elected to Dáil Éireann as a Fine Gael TD for Tipperary North at the 1987 general election and in 1993 he became Chair of the Fine Gael parliamentary party.

In 1994 he was appointed Minister for Transport, Energy and Communications in the Rainbow Coalition government.

A succession of political scandals pursued Lowry throughout his time in office. These included allegations of irregularities relating to the granting of a mobile phone licence to Esat Telecom, which were later investigated by the Moriarty Tribunal, plans for the Dublin Light Rail System and the closure of rural post offices. The 1997 McCracken Tribunal revealed supermarket tycoon Ben Dunne had paid IR£395,000 for an extension to Lowry's home in Tipperary. The Tribunal concluded that Lowry had evaded tax.

This allegation prompted Lowry's resignation from the Cabinet in November 1996. Taoiseach John Bruton announced that Lowry would not be allowed to stand as a Fine Gael candidate at the next election, and he resigned from the party.

=== Independent ===
Lowry announced that he would stand as an independent candidate in the 1997 general election. He topped the poll in his constituency in that election, and did so again in the 2002 and 2007 general elections.

Lowry is backed by a strong local organisation in Tipperary, known informally as "Team Lowry".

Lowry was re-elected to represent Tipperary North at the 2011 general election, heading the poll on the 1st count with 14,010 votes. He was elected again, for Tipperary, at the 2016 general election. He voted for Enda Kenny as Taoiseach on 6 May 2016. Shortly after Ceann Comhairle Seán Ó Fearghaíl confirmed the result, Lowry was seen to offer a handshake to Kenny.

==== 2025 Speaking rights row ====
Following the 2024 Irish general election Lowry led a group of independent TDs in negotiations with Fianna Fáil and Fine Gael on government formation leading to the agreement of a programme for government on 15 January 2025. Lowry announced that the group were "in this for 5 years…We’re a strong, cohesive, united group". Despite his explicit support for the government, the appointment of members of the Independents group as Ministers of State in the government, and the coalition's support for the election of Verona Murphy, a member of the group, as Ceann Comhairle, Lowry and two other members of the group sought to avail of opposition speaking time in the Dáil and to sit on the opposition benches. This was strongly opposed by all opposition parties and led to a stand off in the Dáil on its first sitting of 2025 which delayed the election of Micheál Martin as Taoiseach.

Lowry rejected a subsequent demand by opposition parties that he and the other Independents supporting the government would be excluded from Dáil Leaders' Questions time however, Ceann Comhairle, Verona Murphy later ruled that members of the Regional Independents Group could not form a Technical Group for the purposes of speaking rights saying she was not satisfied that Lowry and other members of the group were "in Opposition" as required by the relevant standing order. Lowry accepted the ruling by the Ceann Comhairle but called for "new procedures" to accommodate Independent TDs who are supportive of the government. He was critical of the Ceann Comhairle's handling of the issue saying that the time taken to make the decision was "excessive and caused problems for everyone".

== Business interests ==
Lowry has directorships listed with the Companies Registration Office. He has two roles with Garuda Ltd, a manufacturer of electric domestic appliances; Abbeygreen Consulting, which involves construction work and special trades; and Gdlc Business Consultants Ltd., a business and management consultancy registered in Dublin. He also has an unlimited company called Glebeland Farm, which manages his bloodstock and livestock interests.

Lowry had some success with horse racing as a quarter-partner in the MALM partnership, but has in recent times taken to flat-race breeding.

Lowry owned a horse named Wedding Morn, though the price he paid for the horse is not known. The horse was covered by Coolmore's Danehill Dancer, from the stable of John Magnier. He would have paid up to €75,000 to have the horse covered. Wedding Morn was delivered of three foals, including one called Probably, and the three were sold for a total of €410,000 by Lowry between 2009 and 2011. Lowry sold Wedding Morn in 2012 for €361,849.

== Moriarty Tribunal: investigation and results ==
One of the remits of the Moriarty Tribunal, which sat from 1997 to 2011, was the investigation of payments to Lowry. In early 2007 Lowry announced that he had made a full and final settlement of all outstanding payments with the Revenue Commissioners in response to the findings concerning his tax evasion. His company Garuda had to pay €1.2 million after a Revenue audit. He also paid almost €200,000 to settle his personal taxes.

In March 2011 the second and final report from the Moriarty Tribunal found that, during his time as Communications Minister, Michael Lowry assisted businessman Denis O'Brien's consortium Esat Digifone in acquiring a lucrative mobile phone licence in the mid-1990s which ultimately made O'Brien one of the richest men in Ireland.

It concluded "beyond doubt" that Lowry gave what it termed "substantive information to Denis O'Brien, of significant value and assistance to him in securing the licence". The Tribunal report found that Lowry, displayed "an appreciable interest" in the process and had "irregular interactions with interested parties at its most sensitive stages". It also found that one of Lowry's interventions, which cut the selection process to the advantage of Esat, was "disgraceful" and "insidious", and that he had misled the Government, his party leader John Bruton and his own civil servants to influence the selection process in Esat's favour.

The tribunal also found that Lowry sought to procure unwarranted rent increases that over a seven-year period would have benefited businessman Ben Dunne. Lowry sought to influence the outcome of an arbitration being conducted in 1995 in relation to the rent payable by the then state-owned Telecom Éireann for Marlborough House to a company owned and controlled by Dunne. The report said that the matter was "profoundly corrupt to a degree that was nothing short of breathtaking".

The report also summarised the cumulative payments made to Lowry, and says "In aggregating the known payments from Denis O'Brien to Michael Lowry, it is apposite to note that, between the granting of the second GSM licence to Esat Digifone in May 1996, and the transmission of £420,000 sterling to complete the purchase of the latter of Lowry's English properties in December 1999, O'Brien had made or facilitated payments to Lowry of £147,000 sterling, £300,000 sterling and a benefit equivalent to a payment in the form of O'Brien's support for a loan of £420,000 sterling."

Lowry had addressed the Dáil saying that if he had been trying to hide a lot of money he would have "put it in an offshore account", implying that no such account existed. The Tribunal found that he actually had at least four such accounts that he used for the purpose of evading tax, and had not disclosed these accounts to the previous McCracken Tribunal.

Lowry rejected the Moriarty report, claiming that it was flawed and that the assumptions and conclusions that Justice Moriarty arrived at were totally baseless. Nonetheless, the Criminal Assets Bureau and the Bureau of Fraud were called in on 29 March 2011 to begin investigating his finances, given that his €1.4 million settlement with the Revenue Commissioners did not grant him immunity from prosecution.

On 31 March 2011, following the Moriarty Report's publication, the Dáil passed an all-party motion calling on Lowry to voluntarily resign his seat.

== Lowry v. Sam Smyth ==
Lowry launched a defamation lawsuit against Irish Independent journalist Sam Smyth in 2010, over an article Smyth had written regarding the Moriarty Tribunal as well as comments Smyth had made on a TV3 show describing Lowry as having been "caught with his hand in the till". Smyth defended the defamation claim, stating he "did not call Michael Lowry TD a thief, but did believe he was a liar and a tax cheat". Lowry's defamation lawsuit was thrown out in the Circuit court, and again on appeal to the High Court. High Court Justice Nicholas Kearns noted that Lowry "did not dispute that he engaged in tax fraud", and ordered Lowry to pay Smyth's legal costs.

== Undeclared land interest ==
It emerged in October 2012 that Lowry owned land in Wigan which he had failed to declare in his register of members' interests. Between 2001 and 2003 the 25-acre site had been owned by Liam Carroll and Vineacre Ltd, a UK property company owned by him and Lowry. Vineacre Ltd was removed from the title in 2003 and Lowry declared his Vineacre interest until the company was dissolved in 2008. The land then became Lowry's and Carroll's in their own names, but he failed to declare his interest from 2008 onwards.

On 6 November 2012, Lowry amended his declaration to the Oireachtas to include the land interest, despite claiming previously that the land was "worthless". An unprecedented 380 complaints were made by members of the public in relation to the scandal, partly prompted by an article written by author Elaine Byrne. According to rules, the property must be worth more than €13,000 to be declared an interest. Lowry claimed the complaints were part of an "orchestrated campaign" against him.

As of December 2012, the probe into Lowry's failure to declare the land interest had been transferred to the Standards in Public Office Commission (SIPO).

== Relationship with Kevin Phelan ==
In March 2013, Northern Ireland land scout Kevin Phelan revealed that Lowry had made payments to him in 2002, of which only half had been disclosed to the Moriarty Tribunal. The Sunday Independent released a secret recording of a telephone conversation made by Phelan, in which Lowry asks for nothing to be revealed about the payment to the tribunal. This was also broadcast on Tonight with Vincent Browne. In November 2015, it was announced that Lowry had launched High Court proceedings against INM in relation to the tapes.

== Tax affairs ==
Lowry availed himself of the Tax Amnesty in 1993. He made a settlement with the Revenue again in 2003. In 2007 he paid a settlement of €192,000, which was due to the emergence of secret payments to him by businessman Ben Dunne. His company Garuda Limited made a settlement of €1.1m in 2005. In 2014 he faced five charges, including knowingly completing incorrect tax returns on a number of dates between 2003 and 2007. In 2018 he was found guilty on one of the charges, relating to a €372,000 payment received in 2002 but not recorded until 2006.

== State board appointments lobbying ==
In January 2015 it was revealed that he lobbied Taoiseach Enda Kenny to have his female former press adviser reappointed to a State board. Lowry passed a note to the Taoiseach in the Dáil chamber asking him to consider re-appointing Valerie O'Reilly, who runs her own successful public relations agency, to the board of the National Transport Authority (NTA). The note read "Taoiseach, would you please consider re-appointing Valerie O'Reilly to the board of the NTA. A woman, bright, intelligent and not bad looking either!" Her initial appointment by the previous government in March 2010 provoked charges of cronyism. The incident came just three months after Kenny and Fine Gael were engulfed in another cronyism scandal involving John McNulty and the Irish Museum of Modern Art. The then Fianna Fáil senator Averil Power expressed surprise at the tone of the note, and said: "She probably does have strong business credentials, but to be referred to in this Father Ted 'lovely girls' sort of way is every women's worst nightmare. It also shows that we need far greater transparency when it comes to State board appointments".

Lowry was also revealed to have lobbied Minister for Transport Paschal Donohoe on the same matter. Donohoe told journalists at UCD that he had been "briefly" approached by Lowry. Lowry himself confirmed he had spoken to Donohoe in the Seanad chamber's anteroom. "I had been following a debate on a health-related issue in the Seanad and, out of courtesy, I informed Mr Donohoe, when I met him, that I had sent a note to the Taoiseach on the reappointment", claimed Lowry. When asked to respond to media coverage of the affair, Lowry said: "It is a load of nonsense and, frankly, more irritating than anything else."

== 2019 local elections ==
In May 2019, five members of Lowry's political group ("Team Lowry"), including his son Micheál, were elected as independents at the Tipperary County Council election. Three had been elected in 2014.

Political offices
Preceded by Brian Cowen	Minister for Transport, Energy and Communications; 1994–1996	Succeeded by John Bruton
Party political offices
Preceded by Tom Enright	Chair of the Fine Gael parliamentary party 1993–1994	Succeeded by Jim Higgins

Dáil	Election	Deputy (Party)	Deputy (Party)	Deputy (Party)
13th	1948	Patrick Kinane (CnaP)	Mary Ryan (FF)	Daniel Morrissey (FG)
14th	1951	John Fanning (FF)	Mary Ryan (FF)	Daniel Morrissey (FG)
15th	1954	John Fanning (FF)	Mary Ryan (FF)	Daniel Morrissey (FG)
16th	1957	John Fanning (FF)	Mary Ryan (FF)	Patrick Tierney (Lab)
17th	1961	John Fanning (FF)	Thomas Dunne (FG)	Patrick Tierney (Lab)
18th	1965	John Fanning (FF)	Thomas Dunne (FG)	Patrick Tierney (Lab)
19th	1969	Michael O'Kennedy (FF)	Thomas Dunne (FG)	Michael Smith (FF)
20th	1973	Michael O'Kennedy (FF)	Thomas Dunne (FG)	John Ryan (Lab)
21st	1977	Michael O'Kennedy (FF)	Michael Smith (FF)	John Ryan (Lab)
22nd	1981	David Molony (FG)	Michael Smith (FF)	John Ryan (Lab)
23rd	1982 (Feb)	David Molony (FG)	Michael O'Kennedy (FF)	John Ryan (Lab)
24th	1982 (Nov)	David Molony (FG)	Michael O'Kennedy (FF)	John Ryan (Lab)
25th	1987	Michael Lowry (FG)	Michael O'Kennedy (FF)	Michael Smith (FF)
26th	1989	Michael Lowry (FG)	Michael O'Kennedy (FF)	Michael Smith (FF)
27th	1992	Michael Lowry (FG)	John Ryan (Lab)	Michael Smith (FF)
28th	1997	Michael Lowry (Ind.)	Michael O'Kennedy (FF)	Michael Smith (FF)
29th	2002	Michael Lowry (Ind.)	Máire Hoctor (FF)	Michael Smith (FF)
30th	2007	Michael Lowry (Ind.)	Máire Hoctor (FF)	Noel Coonan (FG)
31st	2011	Michael Lowry (Ind.)	Alan Kelly (Lab)	Noel Coonan (FG)
32nd	2016	Constituency abolished. See Tipperary and Offaly		

Dáil	Election	Deputy (Party)	Deputy (Party)	Deputy (Party)
34th	2024	Michael Lowry (Ind.)	Alan Kelly (Lab)	Ryan O'Meara (FF)

Dáil	Election	Deputy (Party)	Deputy (Party)	Deputy (Party)	Deputy (Party)	Deputy (Party)	Deputy (Party)	Deputy (Party)
4th	1923	Dan Breen (Rep)	Séamus Burke (CnaG)	Louis Dalton (CnaG)	Daniel Morrissey (Lab)	Patrick Ryan (Rep)	Michael Heffernan (FP)	Seán McCurtin (CnaG)
5th	1927 (Jun)	Seán Hayes (FF)	Séamus Burke (CnaG)	John Hassett (CnaG)	Daniel Morrissey (Lab)	William O'Brien (Lab)	Michael Heffernan (FP)	Andrew Fogarty (FF)
6th	1927 (Sep)	Seán Hayes (FF)	Séamus Burke (CnaG)	John Hassett (CnaG)	Daniel Morrissey (Lab)	Timothy Sheehy (FF)	Michael Heffernan (FP)	Andrew Fogarty (FF)
7th	1932	Seán Hayes (FF)	Séamus Burke (CnaG)	John Hassett (CnaG)	Daniel Morrissey (Ind.)	Timothy Sheehy (FF)	Dan Breen (FF)	Andrew Fogarty (FF)
8th	1933	Seán Hayes (FF)	Séamus Burke (CnaG)	Richard Curran (NCP)	Daniel Morrissey (CnaG)	Martin Ryan (FF)	Dan Breen (FF)	Andrew Fogarty (FF)
9th	1937	William O'Brien (Lab)	Séamus Burke (FG)	Jeremiah Ryan (FG)	Daniel Morrissey (FG)	Martin Ryan (FF)	Dan Breen (FF)	Andrew Fogarty (FF)
10th	1938	Frank Loughman (FF)	Richard Curran (FG)	Jeremiah Ryan (FG)	Daniel Morrissey (FG)	Martin Ryan (FF)	Dan Breen (FF)	Andrew Fogarty (FF)
11th	1943	Richard Stapleton (Lab)	William O'Donnell (CnaT)	Jeremiah Ryan (FG)	Daniel Morrissey (FG)	Martin Ryan (FF)	Dan Breen (FF)	Andrew Fogarty (FF)
12th	1944	Frank Loughman (FF)	William O'Donnell (CnaT)	Richard Mulcahy (FG)	Daniel Morrissey (FG)	Mary Ryan (FF)	Dan Breen (FF)	Andrew Fogarty (FF)
12th	1947 by-election	Frank Loughman (FF)	Patrick Kinane (CnaP)	Richard Mulcahy (FG)	Daniel Morrissey (FG)	Mary Ryan (FF)	Dan Breen (FF)	Andrew Fogarty (FF)
13th	1948	Constituency abolished. See Tipperary North and Tipperary South						

Dáil	Election	Deputy (Party)	Deputy (Party)	Deputy (Party)	Deputy (Party)	Deputy (Party)
32nd	2016	Séamus Healy (WUA)	Alan Kelly (Lab)	Jackie Cahill (FF)	Michael Lowry (Ind.)	Mattie McGrath (Ind.)
33rd	2020	Martin Browne (SF)	Alan Kelly (Lab)	Jackie Cahill (FF)	Michael Lowry (Ind.)	Mattie McGrath (Ind.)
34th	2024	Constituency abolished. See Tipperary North and Tipperary South				
