= Moriarty Tribunal =

Irish investigation into politicians

The Moriarty Tribunal, officially called the Tribunal of Inquiry into certain Payments to Politicians and Related Matters, was an Irish Tribunal of Inquiry established in 1997 into the financial affairs of politicians Charles Haughey and Michael Lowry. It has revealed significant tax evasion by these and other politicians and leading businessmen. As a consequence, the tax authorities have recovered millions of euro in settlements and penalties from many individuals. The final report of the tribunal was expected to be published in mid-January 2010, but was delayed and was published 22 March 2011.

== Background ==
As a result of change of management in Dunnes Stores, a leading retail group in Ireland, it was revealed in the press that Ben Dunne had made substantial secret payments to the former Taoiseach Charles Haughey and Minister Michael Lowry. In response the Bruton Government established The McCracken Inquiry in 1997 to investigate. The inquiry reported in late 1997 and confirmed the facts and revealed monies in secret Ansbacher accounts owned by Haughey for which it could not determine the source.

=== Establishment ===
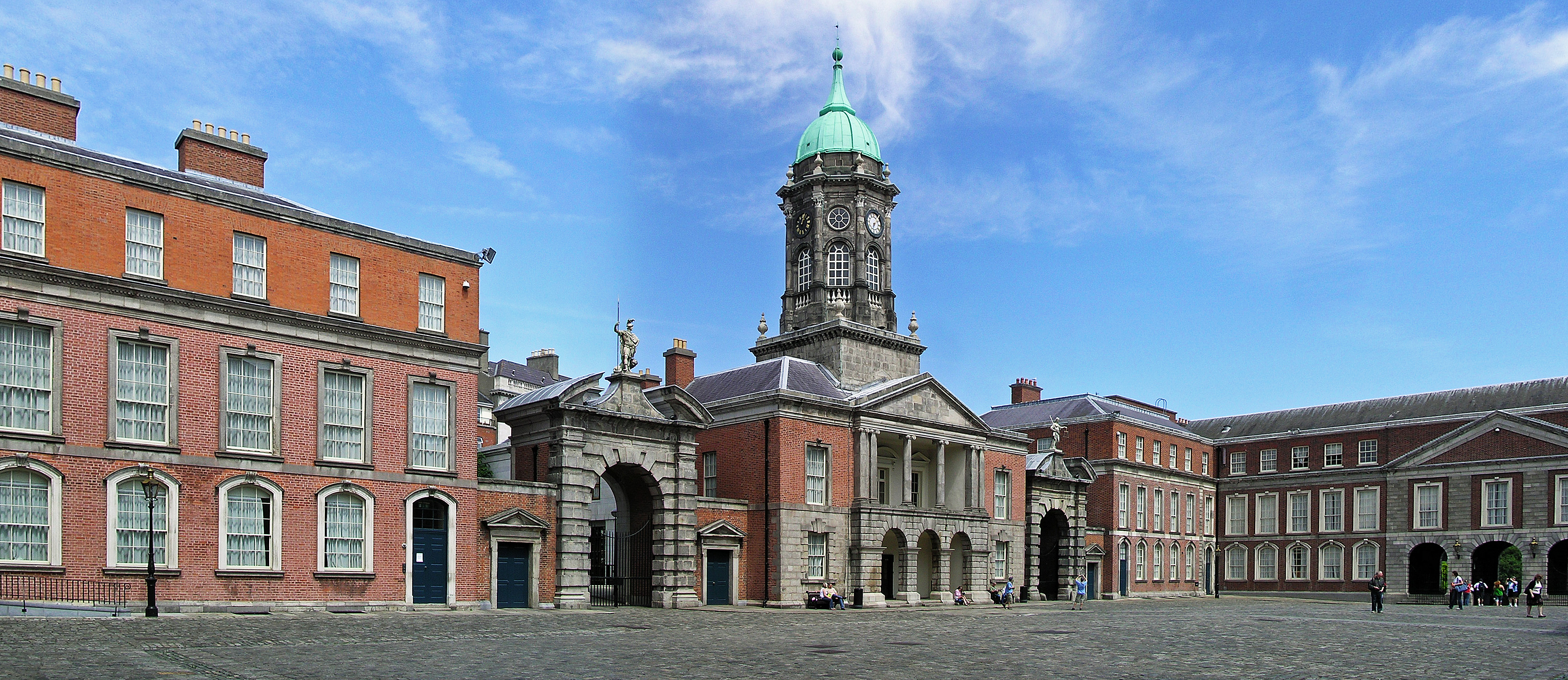
The tribunal sat in Dublin Castle

In response to the McCracken Report, the new Ahern Government issued terms of reference for a new follow-up tribunal on 26 September 1997. The sole member of the Tribunal is the Honourable Mr Justice Michael Moriarty, leading to the name Moriarty Tribunal.

The terms were inquiry into (inter alia):

- whether substantial payments which might not have been ethical to receive were made to Charles Haughey (Taoiseach during part of the time concerned) and Michael Lowry between 1 January 1979 and 31 December 1996,
- the source of those payments,
- whether payments were made to people holding public office,
- whether Mr Haughey made any decisions benefiting a person making such a payment,
- the source of money in various bank accounts in Ireland, the Channel Islands, and the Isle of Man,
- whether the Republic's tax authorities were properly and timely informed of the existence of various payments and gifts to Messrs. Haughey and Lowry.

The preliminary report into the Haughey payments was published on 19 December 2006. The final reports were published in 2011.

=== Costs and delays ===
The Tribunal sat for the first time on 31 October 1997 and heard its first witness on 28 January 1999. By September 2004, the Tribunal had sat on 286 days but sittings were suspended pending a High Court hearing in which mobile phone entrepreneur Denis O'Brien tried unsuccessfully to prevent the tribunal from investigating Michael Lowry's involvement in his purchase of Doncaster Rovers F.C. The tribunal ended up lasting much longer than anticipated and cost the state millions in direct costs and legal assistance to witnesses, something that has been criticised by the people whom the tribunal investigated.

In March 2010, it was estimated the tribunal had cost the state approximately €39 million, with final costs expected to exceed €100 million.

== Volume I ==
- Dunne payments to Haughey
- Use of accounts in Ansbacher by Haughey
- Management of Haughey's financial affairs by Des Traynor
- Sale of Glen Ding Woods to CRH plc
- Management of donations for a liver transplant for Brian Lenihan

=== 2006 Findings ===
- Confirmation of facts regarding payments by Dunne to Haughey and Lowry
- Confirmation of use of the Ansbacher accounts by Haughey
- Mr. Haughey had obstructed the tribunal
- Tax avoidance findings
- Mr. Haughey stole a "sizeable proportion" from the Brian Lenihan medical fund and took steps to conceal his actions
- Claims that Mr. Haughey knew little about his own personal finances were rejected
- Charles Haughey accepted cash in return for favours throughout his political career.

=== Consequences ===
- Investigations of Mr Haughey and Mr Lowry for tax evasion by the Revenue Commissioners. Settlements by both
- Advance sale and leaseback of his home, Abbeville, by Mr Haughey
- Revelations of use of the Ansbacher accounts by other businessmen and politicians for tax avoidance. An interim report on the lead to an investigation by the Department of Trade and Enterprise which named the holders, and led to Denis Foley TD leaving Fianna Fáil. The Cayman island scandal which was investigated by the Moriarty tribunal involved Guinness and Mahon bank and has not yielded a single prosecution, as of March 2013, because of a lack of "original documentation. However, the Revenue Commissioner documents state that as of the end of 2013 a "total yield" of €112.69m has been obtained from 141 Ansbacher account cases. This is made up of €50.1m in tax paid and €62.59m in penalties".
- Related press investigations on corruption, such as that on Beverley Flynn TD
- Related investigations by the Dáil Public Accounts committee on the use of foreign accounts for tax evasion, leading to settlements by the banks, and thousands of individuals.

== Volume II ==
=== Awarding of the second mobile phone licence ===
The circumstances surrounding the awarding of the second GSM mobile phone licence to the Esat Digifone consortium in 1996 (the biggest contract ever awarded by the State to a private company) by the Rainbow Coalition government was the focus of the work of the tribunal from 2007. The tribunal investigated whether money changed hands prior to the awarding of the licence to Esat Digifone by former Minister for Transport, Energy and Communications Michael Lowry TD. Denis O'Brien claimed preliminary findings by the tribunal effectively state that the Esat consortium was "illegally" issued with the state's second mobile-phone licence because he had a "corrupt" relationship with Michael Lowry. A number of failed bidders are suing the state over the handling of the competition process.

==== Esat Digifone ====
Esat Digifone logo

In 1995, Esat Digifone was a consortium made up of Denis O'Brien's Communicorp (40%), Telenor AB (40%) and the remaining 20% held by institutional shareholders. Esat Digifone won the 1995 competition process and entered into exclusive negotiations with the Department of Transport, Energy and Communications.

===== Exclusive negotiations and new shareholding by Dermot Desmond =====
It transpired that during the contracting period a change in the shareholding in Esat Digifone had occurred with financier Dermot Desmond's IIU Nominees taking a share of 25% of the company and Communicorp and Telenor AB holding the remainder between them. The Department of Communications decided that the 25% holding by IIU Ltd. was unacceptable in May 1996 and demanded a return to the 40-40-20 structure, but this information was not communicated to the Attorney-General's office at the time.

The department and Lowry demanded that the 40:40:20 breakdown of the shares in Esat should be restored prior to the issuing of the licence, which resulted in Desmond selling part of his shareholding to Communicorp and Telenor. The licence was awarded to Digifone in May 1996, with Lowry announcing Digifone the winner before civil servants involved in judging the competition made their final decision.

===== Legal opinion of Richard Nesbitt SC =====
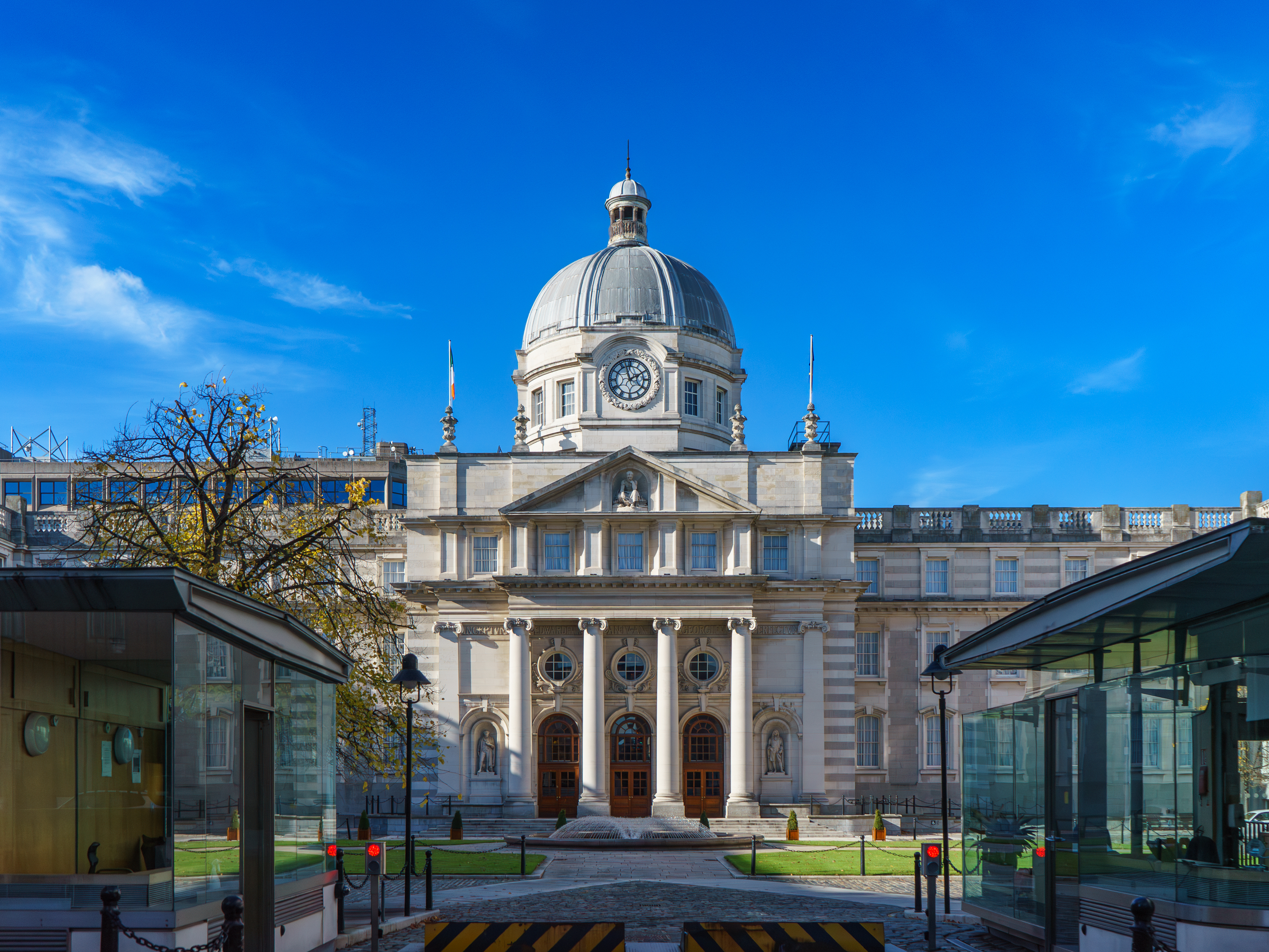
Government Buildings location of the Attorney-General's Office

In May 1996, the Attorney-General's office sought the advice of barrister Richard Nesbitt regarding the change in shareholding. Nesbitt advised the government that the licence could be awarded regardless of the fact that Dermot Desmond had joined the consortium at a later date. The advice of Nesbitt as recalled by Denis McFadden – a barrister in the A-G's office – was to the effect that IIU's entry was not a material change and merely amounted to "equity finance".

===== Moriarty's findings =====
In February 2008, Judge Moriarty gave a legal finding that the written advice given by Richard Nesbitt in 1996 to the Attorney General's office did not cover what is known as "the ownership issue". This finding followed a private meeting of tribunal counsel in October 2002 recalled by Denis McFadden BL and attended by, amongst others, John Gormley BL and Richard Nesbitt SC, Jerry Healy SC for the tribunal described Nesbitt's advice to the government as "shite". Following the addition of new evidence, Judge Moriarty conceded that the advice of Richard Nesbitt did cover the acquisition of a 25% shareholding by IIU and that he would reappraise his interim findings that it did not. Judge Moriarty admitted to making "not insignificant mistakes" in regards to the license issue which would have to be "taken on the chin and acknowledged".

==== Statements by key participants ====
A media war broke out in early 2010 over the preliminary findings of the tribunal with Denis O'Brien, Michael Lowry TD and Judge Moriarty each making statements about the process.

===== O'Brien Statement =====
Denis O'Brien sent a letter to the chairman of the tribunal Judge Moriarty alleging that the tribunal's "activities really reaches a new low in Irish judicial history" and was "totally biased" O'Brien has claimed that the tribunal had set out to "get his scalp", but "must now admit they were wrong" Denis O'Brien established the website MoriartyTribunal.com on 16 October 2009. The site was created by the O'Brien team to present his perspective on the work of the Moriarty Tribunal

===== Lowry statement =====
In January 2010 Michael Lowry TD issued a 3,400-word statement (available here) outlining his perspective on the tribunal. Lowry's claims relate principally to the involvement of financier Dermot Desmond as a 20 per cent shareholder in the Esat Digifone consortium and outlining that it was not possible for him to meddle in the process or direct a result without the collusion of civil servants. Lowry has also criticised the tribunal in the Dáil, pointing out the high costs and delay involved.

===== Moriarty Statement =====
Judge Moriarty has said his report will be "founded unequivocally on evidence" and not on speculation and working hypotheses and that he was not "trying to cobble together a report that will unjustly condemn" people on "flimsy evidence". He was mystified as to why this "unthinkable suggestion" should be made concerning someone who had been appointed by both Houses of the Oireachtas. He had learned as a judge to be "big enough and humble enough to correct errors" but he was not saying errors had been made and important matters remained to be canvassed in evidence. Judge Moriarty also hit back at the media campaign against the tribunal claiming he was "not going to be distracted by the prevalence of spin, and other controversies...that would not be welcomed by the courts."

=== 2011 Findings ===
==== Conclusions ====
- Lowry "secured the winning" of the 1995 mobile licence for O'Brien.
- O'Brien made two payments to Lowry in 1996 and 1999 totalling IR£500,000 (£147,000 and £300,000) and supported a loan of £420,000 given to Lowry in 1999, a benefit equivalent to a payment.
- Lowry imparted substantive information to O'Brien which was "of significant value and assistance to him in securing the licence".
- Lowry bypassed consideration by his Cabinet colleagues and thereby not only influenced, but delivered the result for Esat Digifone.
- A US$50,000 donation to Fine Gael was made through Telenor on behalf of Esat Digifone.
- Lowry sought to influence a hike in the lease for Marlborough House (Telecom Éireann headquarters) following a request from Mr Dunne. These rent increases would have improperly enriched Dunne, and were deemed to be "profoundly corrupt".
- Lowry was criticised for his "cynical and venal abuse of office" and his brazen refusal to acknowledge the impropriety of his financial arrangements with O'Brien and Dunne.

==== Recommendations ====
- Greater precautions ought to have been taken to segregate those conducting the evaluation of the mobile phone licence bids from their political master.
- All donations to politicians or political parties should be reported to the SIPO (Standards in Public Office) Commission.
- All recommendations by public office holders to the Revenue Commissioners be in writing.

=== Criminal investigation ===
Following the publication of the final report of the tribunal copies were sent to the Revenue Commissioners, the Garda Commissioner and the Director of Public Prosecutions. A team of detectives, led by the Criminal Assets Bureau (CAB) chief, DCS Eugene Corcoran, investigated if the report could identify any criminal wrongdoing that could be then investigated.

== See also ==
- Mahon Tribunal
- Public inquiries in the Republic of Ireland
- McCracken Tribunal
- Beef Tribunal
