= Frank Dunlop (civil servant) =

Irish lobbyist (born 1947)

Frank Dunlop (born 9 October 1947) is an Irish lobbyist, former civil servant and former broadcast journalist with Raidió Teilifís Éireann (RTÉ). Originally from County Kilkenny, he was a key witness to the Mahon Tribunal which investigated improper payments by property developers to Irish politicians and will be a key witness in pending political corruption cases involving property developers and politicians to whom he paid bribes on their behalf.

== Early life and education ==
Dunlop was born in Kilkenny on 9 October 1947. He attended St James's Christian Brothers School. At the age of 22, he attended University College Dublin. In his biography, Dunlop states that his family received candidates running for election within the Fianna Fáil party were more warmly received at his home. At UCD, Dunlop began to become involved in politics and he joined Kevin Barry Cumann, the branch of Fianna Fáil's youth wing in the university. Initially he wanted to pursue a career as a reporter for Raidió Teilifís Éireann in current affairs and news.

== Public service career ==
=== Party and Government Press Secretary ===
He was appointed Press Secretary of the Fianna Fáil party in 1974, based at Leinster House. He was head of the Irish Government's Information Service and Government Press Secretary from 1977 to 1982, a position that had been established on Dunlop's recommendation. This role involved developing relationships with media outlets, including RTÉ, The Irish Times, Irish Independent amongst others. There were no other authorised radio stations in Ireland at this stage although there were quite a number of illegal broadcasters. The Government Information Service, prior to Dunlop's time, was the established unit of the Taoiseach's office for the dissemination of information relating to the activities of the Government. Dunlop described its role to The Mahon Tribunal in 2003, as being a 'post office' – "it just delivered copies of statements, speeches, announcements, CSO details to the news desks of newspapers; there was no substantive policy discussions with the media prior to that time".

The objective was to facilitate an understanding in the media of what Fianna Fáil was doing or was about at that time. This role enabled Dunlop to develop significant relationships with political correspondents, news reporters, editorial personnel and politicians.

=== Civil servant at the Department of Education and Environment ===
Following a change in government, Dunlop was an established civil servant with the rank of Assistant Secretary. He moved to the Department of Education when Fine Gael politician John Boland was Minister and his role was liaison with the media. He made some inputs on policy matter on education.

He subsequently moved with Boland to the Department of the Environment and worked there for about two years as Assistant Secretary with responsibility for media matters but he had no input on planning matters.

== Private career ==
=== Public relations consultant ===
Dunlop left the civil service in 1986 and became a public relations consultant with Dublin firm, Murray Consultants. He had a director's role which involved developing a portfolio of clients and he head a target fee income to deliver annually. Access to government enables a public relations consultant to be, in effect, a public affairs consultant and Dunlop's immediate prior experience made him uniquely qualified in this respect.

He resigned from Murray Consultants in 1989 and established his own firm, Frank Dunlop & Associates. He brought his client portfolio with him, paying the partners of Murray Consultants an agreed sum over a period of two or three years. By this stage Dunlop had garnered a knowledge of the essential elements of the Irish planning process although he has no formal training in planning or architecture.

Dunlop told The Mahon Tribunal, in June 2006, that he kept a stash of cash to bribe county councillors on a regular basis in the 18 property development transactions he was involved with as a public relations consultant. He has described how several politicians telephoned him in panic trying to discover how much he had paid them when bribery allegations first emerged. Liam Lawlor introduced him to landowners and developers.

=== Television presenter ===
From 1997 to 2000, he presented the Network 2 show Later on 2 with Fergus Finlay former the chef de cabinet of the Labour Party. RTÉ replaced him in favour of Jackie Gallagher after Tom Gilmartin alleged that Dunlop had made payments to politicians at The Mahon Tribunal.

=== Legal studies ===
Dunlop studied for an LL.B degree in Irish Law in Griffith College Dublin, Ireland's largest law school, graduating with a first class honours in 2007.

== Tribunal and investigation ==
=== The Mahon Tribunal ===
The Irish Government established a "Tribunal of Inquiry into Certain Planning Matters and Payments", The Mahon Tribunal, formerly known as The Flood Tribunal, on 4 November 1997. Frank Dunlop was a key witness to its deliberations. Dunlop was initially brought to the attention of the Tribunal by Tom Gilmartin, who alleged that Dunlop was being used as a bag-man for developers wishing to pay bribes to politicians in return for favours. When he first took the witness stand in 2000, after failing to provide a written statement, Chairman Flood responded to his evidence by asking him to reflect overnight on his position. The following day, Dunlop began to reveal payments that he had made to politicians. His eventually ended 124 days on the witness stand in March 2008

=== Criminal Assets Bureau Investigation ===
The Criminal Assets Bureau successfully obtained a High Court order on 26 July 2006 freezing land assets of 107 acres (0.43 km^{2}) at Carrickmines, County Dublin owned by Jackson Way Properties Ltd and preventing their sale. This means that these cannot be sold or pledged as collateral without the consent of the High Court. CAB contended that these lands had been rezoned on 16 December 1997 by Dún Laoghaire–Rathdown County Council from agricultural to industrial after Dunlop bribed and made corrupt payments to councillors to secure their support in the rezoning vote. That rezoning vote increased the value of just 17 acres (69,000 m^{2}) of the property from €8 million to €61 million. CAB has interviewed and took statements from Dunlop between 2004 and 2006. He will be called to testify in the criminal trial.

If this case succeeds the potential money realised by CAB will be substantially more than the yield from gangland criminals since 1996. Other similar cases are likely to ensue involving lands investigated by The Mahon Tribunal.

=== Prison time ===
Dunlop himself has been charged with corruption – to which his reply was 'we always knew this day was coming and I will not be contesting the charges'.

The lands in question have been the subject of investigation by The Mahon Tribunal in 2003 and 2004.

On 26 May 2009, he was sentenced to two years in prison for corruption, with the final six months suspended. He was released from prison on 10 July 2010, having served 14 months.

== Personal life ==
Dunlop is married to Sheila, and has one daughter, Sinéad, and one son, Cathal, who died aged 16 from cancer. They live outside of Dunshaughlin, County Meath.
