= Irish political scandals =

Since at least the 1970s, many Irish political scandals relating to miscarriage of justice, dereliction of duty and corruption by public officials have resulted in the establishment of extrajudicial Tribunals of Enquiry, which are typically chaired by retired High-Court judges and cannot make judgements against any of the parties. Since 2004 many such scandals have been investigated by the less costly but less transparent Commissions of Investigation. Many Irish scandals, however, have not resulted in trials or public enquiries.

== 1970s ==
- 1970 - The Arms Crisis: Division in Irish Cabinet when two ministers arranged to import arms for the IRA in Northern Ireland
- 1974 - Dublin and Monaghan Bombings Investigation: Aborted Garda investigation into alleged MI5 collusion in bombings of Dublin and Monaghan (reported 2007)
- 1976 - Thundering Disgrace: Defence Minister, Paddy Donegan refers to Uachtarán na hÉireann, Cearbhall Ó Dálaigh as a "Thundering Disgrace" in an address to troops and receives no sanction from Taoiseach, Liam Cosgrave

== 1980s ==
- 1981 - The Stardust Fire enquiry: Fire in night-club with pad-locked fire doors results in 48 deaths. Following a 12-day investigation, nobody is held accountable
- 1982 - The "GUBU" Affair: Attorney General flies abroad as fugitive double-murderer is arrested in his apartment
- 1983 - Phone tapping scandal: FF Justice Minister orders Gardaí to "tap" the phones of political journalists"
- 1984 - The Kerry Babies case: Gardaí in Kerry concoct fantastical infanticide charges against a young woman and her family

== 1990s ==
- 1990 - The Duffy Tape: FF Presidential candidate, Brian Lenihan Snr, admits attempting to influence a decision of the out-going president to dissolve the Dáil in 1982
- 1991 - Beef Export Credit Insurance scheme: ITV World in Action exposes practices of Goodman International Ltd. and other Irish Beef exporters insured directly by the Irish Government
- 1994 - BTSB anti-D scandal: Anti-D immunoglobulin contaminated with Hepatitis C was given to pregnant mothers since the 1970s. BTSB seeks to minimize compensation by delaying and contesting applications of terminally ill victims
- 1994 - Guinness Mahon/Ansbacher Cayman: Des Traynor's off-shore numbered bank account scheme for Ireland's Rich and Famous (reported 2002)
- 1995 - HIV/Hep. C contaminated haemophilia factors: BTSB and NHTC continue to provide haemophiliacs with untreated blood products after risks of HIV and Hepatitis infections were known since mid-1980s
- 1996 - Carlos Salinas de Gortari disgraced former president of Mexico is reported to be living in exile in Ireland and moving in the best social circles
- 1996 - Award of 2nd mobile network licence: While evaluating bidders, the Dept. of Transport, Energy and Communications held exclusive negotiations with the Esat Digifone consortium whose selection was prematurely announced by the minister
- 1996 - Soldier "K"'s Army deafness claim: Compensation claim for hearing damage that triggered a flood of similar claims that eventually cost the Department of Defense in excess of €290M
- 1997 - The Corrupt rezoning of land for development in County Dublin: An advert offering a £10k reward for information on planning corruption results in the state's longest-running public inquiry
- 1996 - Ben Dunne's largesse: Ben Dunne Jnr.'s unorthodox payments to politicians Charles Haughey, Minister Michael Lowry and others emerge in a report his sister commissioned from Price-Waterhouse.
- 1998 - AIB bogus off-shore bank accounts : AIB facilitated DIRT Tax evasion by allowing Irish residents to have bogus "off-shore" accounts

== 2000s ==
- 2000 - Abbeylara siege and shooting: 27-year-old John Carthy with history of psychiatric illness shot dead by the Garda Emergency Response Unit after a 25-hour siege at his home
- 2000 - The Moriarty Tribunal investigates allegations of corruption on the part of Charlie Haughey and Michael Lowry
- 2000 - FÁS expenses scandal: FÁS executives spent hundreds of thousands of euro on lavish holidays to the USA under the guise of promoting a Science Challenge programme
- 2005 - Jailing of the Rossport Five: Five Co. Mayo Farmers who refuse to allow Shell Ireland lay a gas pipeline across their land are jailed for contempt of court
- 2008 - Personal Finances of Bertie Ahern: Following criticism by both the Mahon and Moriarty tribunals, the former Taoiseach's personal finances come under scrutiny by the media
- 2008 - Anglo Irish Bank hidden directors' loans Directors of Anglo Irish Bank borrowed over €100M to buy shares in the Bank and would temporarily transfer the loans to other financial institutions so they would not appear in their audited accounts
- 2009 - Resignation of Ceann Comhairle John O'Donoghue in a controversy over expenditure on overseas travel when he served as a minister and later as speaker at Dáil Éireann.

== 2010s ==
- 2010 - RTE Prime Time Report on Symphysiotomy: It is estimated that 1,500 women unknowingly and without consent underwent an outdated obstetric procedure in the Republic of Ireland between 1944 and 1987
- 2011 - Double Irish, Dutch Sandwich & Green Jersey: Massive corporation Tax avoidance schemes facilitated by the Irish tax code enabling profit shifting to low-tax regimes
- 2013 - Garda Penalty Points Cancellation: Garda "whistleblowers" allege that Gardaí across the state were favouring certain speeding drivers by cancelling (or failing to register) thousands of penalty points
- 2014 - GSOC "Bugging" Investigation: The Garda Síochána Ombudsman Commission (GSOC) engaged UK security contractor Verrimus to "sweep" their offices.
- 2014 - Central Remedial Clinic Salary Top-Ups: Senior executives of CRC receive a statutory salary of over €100k from the HSE, which they “top-up” from charitable funds to more than double their salaries
- 2014 - Garda whistleblower scandal: Two Gardaí who made separate "protected" disclosures complaining about poor standards in the force were ostracized by colleagues and superiors and subjected to a smear campaign by various agencies of the state
- 2016 - U.S. vulture funds paying no Irish Taxes US distressed debt funds file Irish company CRO accounts with large profits on Irish investments (made from 2012 onwards), but no Irish tax payments
- 2016 - Console charity scandal: Founder of suicide charity Paul Kelly, his wife Patricia and son Tim, had run up a bill of almost €500,000 on the charity's credit card to pay for a luxury car, foreign holidays, designer clothes, and tickets to major sporting events
- 2016 - National Children's Hospital Ireland, a hospital which has been under construction since 2016 in Dublin and is still not finished as of April 2026
- 2017 - Bogus Garda Breath Tests: The Garda was forced to admit that half of the two million alcohol breath tests it claimed were carried out on motorists between 2012 and 2016, were bogus.
- 2018 - CervicalCheck cancer scandal: Hundreds of women whose Cervical Smear tests were incorrectly reported have since developed full cancer. HSE delays engagement to minimize compensation
- 2019 - CSO Report on Irish Defense Forces: Report shows that 85% of Irish military personnel earn less than the average industrial wage.

== 2020s ==
- 2020 - "Golf Gate": During the COVID-19 pandemic, the Oireachtas Golf Society hosts a post-tournament dinner at Clifden Hotel, in apparent breach of regulations. Ultimately the District Court dismissed all charges against the only four people who were prosecuted.
- 2021 - Mother and Baby Homes Commission Report: Commission of Investigation into Mother and Baby Homes publishes its long-delayed, final report omitting and redacting the testimonies of many survivors
- 2021 - Dept. of Health autism dossiers: RTÉ Investigates documentary interviews a whistleblower alleging that the Dept. of Health was secretly gathering information from private consultations about the families, parents and siblings of children with autism
- 2021 - Katherine Zappone controversy: a gathering is held in breach of COVID-19 regulations at the Merrion Hotel
- 2021 - Bóthar Charity embezzlement: Four managers of the Irish livestock charity accused of misappropriating €1.1M in funds
- 2021 - Inner City Helping Homeless: Charities Regulator winds up the company after founder and CEO is accused of sexually assaulting homeless men
- 2021 - Mica scandal: Decades-long failure to regulate building materials results in thousand of homes crumbling in counties Donegal, Roscommon, Mayo and Clare and brings mass protests to the streets of Dublin
- 2021 - The "Women of Honour" scandal: RTE radio documentary exposes institutional bullying, misogyny and sexual violence within the Irish Defense Forces.
- 2023 - The RTÉ secret payment scandal: RTÉ TV used secret funds to pay leader presenter Ryan Tubridy €345,000 between 2017 and 2023.
- 2024 - The Dáil bike shed controversy: The Office of Public Works spends €336,051 on a bike shed for the use of Dáil members at Leinster House
- 2025 - During the 2025 Irish presidential election, candidate Jim Gavin withdraws from the campaign 19 days before the election owing to a controversy in which it was revealed he failed to pay back a former tenant of his €3,300 in overpaid rent

== See also ==
- Cute hoor, a cultural concept in Ireland where a certain level of corruption of politicians or businessmen is forgiven - or sometimes even applauded.
