= Dáil bike shed =

Bicycle storage unit outside Leinster House, Dublin, Ireland

Coordinates: 53°20′26.12″N 6°15′8.83″W

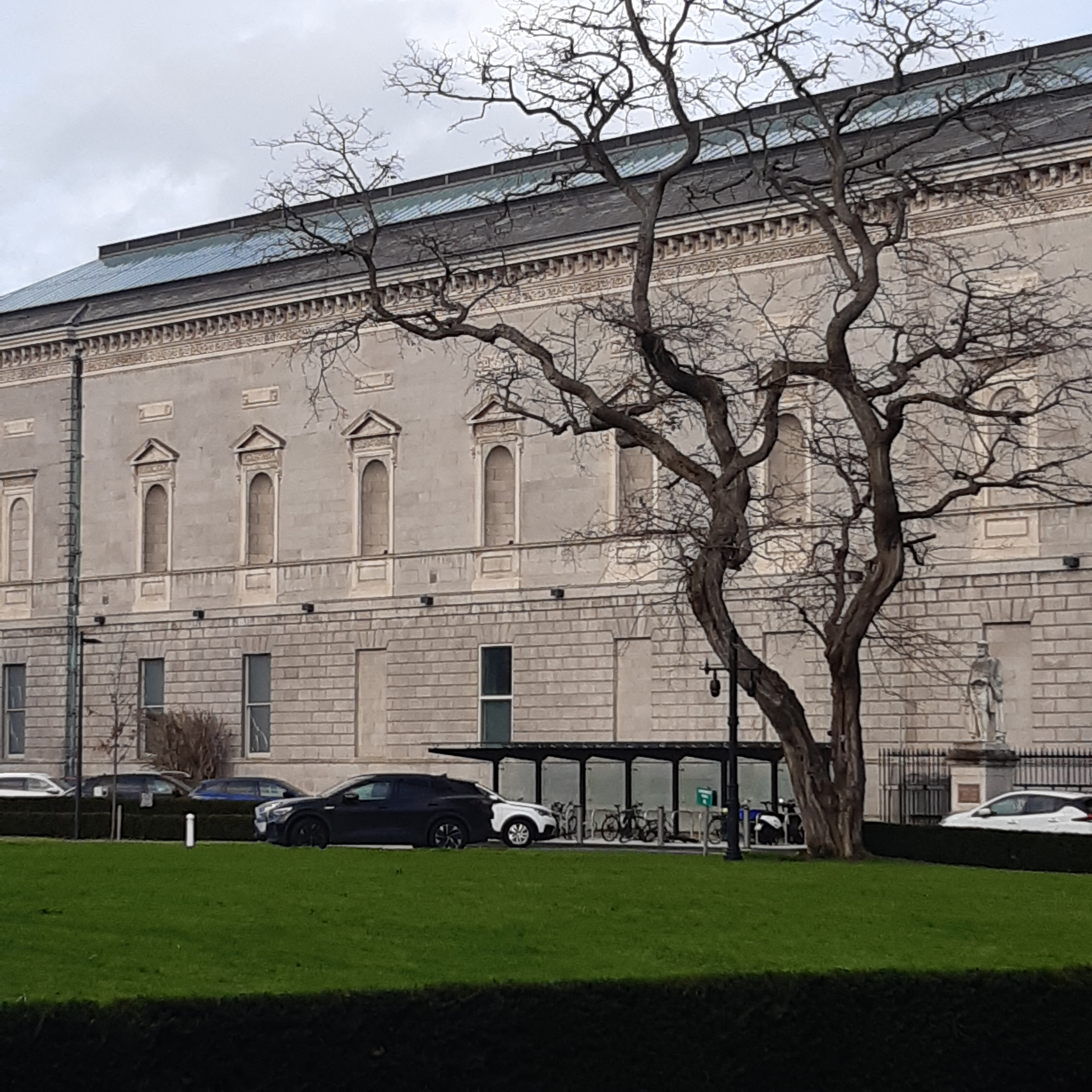
The bike shed (seen near the base of the tree) on the private grounds of Leinster House in December 2025

The Dáil bike shed, or bike shelter, is a roofed bicycle parking rack at the rear of Leinster House (the seat of the parliament of Ireland) in Dublin that was completed in April 2024 and became the subject of controversy in the Irish government and media in September 2024 after its disproportionately high cost was revealed. Construction of the shelter was outsourced by the Office of Public Works to Sensori Facilities Management, and cost taxpayers €336,051. It allows for the storage of 18 bicycles.

The bike shed is on the east side of the Leinster House complex, at the side of a green area named Leinster Lawn, which faces Merrion Square. The story received so much coverage in September 2024 and the months following, that a number of news sources applied a 'Bike Shed' tag to their articles on the subject.

== Background ==
Leinster House was built in the Georgian period of the mid-1700s and has been the meeting place of Dáil Éireann, the lower house and principal chamber of the Oireachtas (parliament of Ireland), since 1922.

An Oireachtas spokeswoman told RTÉ News in 2024 that a plan for the provision of a bicycle shelter "had been brought before the Oireachtas Commission" in June 2021 and was approved. The planning application was lodged in October 2022 and granted the following month. In April 2023, the OPW estimated that the bike shelter project would cost €350,000, however the Oireachtas Commission were not informed of this cost at that stage.

The contractor Sensori Facilities Management was appointed by the OPW to build the shelter in December 2023, and works commenced in January 2024. The bike shelter was initially expected to have been finished "around" 14 January 2024, however it was delayed by a number of issues, including efforts not to disturb the Dáil, and was eventually completed in mid-April 2024.

TheJournal.ie notes that in April 2024, while the bike shed was still under construction, Transport Minister Eamon Ryan welcomed its addition to Leinster House, adding "It's an example of the type of changes taking place right across the public service, as part of the Public Sector Climate Action Mandate." In July 2024, it was noted that Labour Party leader Ivana Bacik had "pushed" for new bike shelters at Leinster House, but the acting Ceann Comhairle at the time, Seán Ó Fearghaíl, thought it "extremely unlikely" that planning permission would be provided for the addition, and that the "existing (bike shed) facilities were underused."

== Construction ==
The shed, technically not a shed but an L-shaped canopy, was constructed using Irish granite, glass and steel. Green Party TD Neasa Hourigan suggested it could have been built for "half the money", and as an unenclosed structure, there was no guarantee it would even keep the rain off the bicycles - "So your bike's possibly still going to get wet".

The Office of Public Works (OPW), who oversaw the construction of the structure, said in an information note that:

The work referred to was carried out (...) as part of the ongoing essential maintenance and upgrade works that are undertaken within the Leinster House Complex and other OPW-owned buildings. This is one of the core functions and responsibilities of OPW and to this end there is a continuous programme of essential fabric and upgrade works identified by the OPW team responsible for the complex, working with Oireachtas Facilities.

TheJournal.ie noted that a "breakdown of costs from the Office of Public Works" showed that €322,282 was spent on the main construction and installation project, while €2,952 was spent on archaeological services and a further €10,816 paid for quantity surveying services and "contract administration services". The OPW defended their pricing, stating that "a high-quality structure was needed because of its sensitive location."

In an audit carried out by consultants Deloitte into how the bike shed was managed, it was revealed in May 2025 that "while some practices in the Public Spending Code were followed by the OPW", there was no "value-for-money assessment" carried out. Deloitte stated that "the reasons for the costs associated with the Bike Shelter project should have been documented in a value-for-money assessment which should have been performed within the OPW as part of a robust options appraisal process". A report conducted by the consultancy concluded that the "project management process for elective capital projects less than €500k in value requires review and update".

In June 2025, RTÉ News reported that during the construction of the bike shed in August 2023, a two-foot-wide manhole was discovered onsite which had not been "spotted when drawing up site plans" and delayed the project. The manhole as well as a "significant piece of below ground drainage infrastructure" delayed the project as the OPW had to re-examine the structure of the intended bicycle shelter, and whether any changes would be needed. The delay meant that the OPW missed their opportunity to carry out works onsite while the Dáil had broken up for their summer recess. RTÉ News noted that "in the past (the) OPW were not permitted to work outside these recess periods", however this was not the case anymore at the time of the building works.

In January 2024, the builders also unexpectedly came across "large blocks of concrete" underground which took time to remove in a sensitive manner. The project was also generally beset by delays as strict conditions onsite regulated when work could take place, to ensure "full dust containment" and to avoid any of the debris entering the easily blocked historic drains. Works were also held up as the OPW were cautious not to hoard-off TD's and Senator's car parking spaces while the Dáil was sitting.

In internal Oireachtas records seen by the Carlow Nationalist, an email dating from September 2023 revealed how the original plans for the shelter had included the provision of EV charging points for electric bicycles, but this plan was eventually dropped as a "significant fire risk" onsite.

=== Contractor ===
Speaking in September 2024, John Conlon, chairman of the OPW, noted that the bike shed project had been outsourced to south Dublin contractor Sensori Facilities Management, who had further outsourced it themselves. Conlon noted that Sensori, along with PJ Hegarty, "currently holds the OPW tender for smaller-scale measured term maintenance contracts (MTMC)", such as the bike shed project.

Sensori, a facilities company, had also been paid €21 million under an OPW contract which outsources the maintenance of state buildings. Peadar Tóibín, leader of the political party Aontú, highlighted some concerns about the transparency of the Sensori contract on X (Twitter) in the weeks following the breaking of the scandal.

== Revelation and controversy ==
The story first appeared on 1 September 2024, in an article written by journalist Ken Foxe in the online newspaper TheJournal.ie, which was subsequently republished some hours later in The Irish Times. (Note: Note: The number of bicycles initially reported on 1 September 2024 as being able to park at the bike shed was revised from 36 (in TheJournal.ie article) to 18 (in the Irish Times article).) Foxe listed a breakdown of the €335,000+ cost of the structure, and noted that, when "asked for a copy of the business case for the project", the OPW had replied that "none had been needed". Foxe reported that the stand of the shelter was built with a "special cantilevered canopy that is designed to protect from the prevailing northerly winds", but noted that the structure had not, however, been fully enclosed.

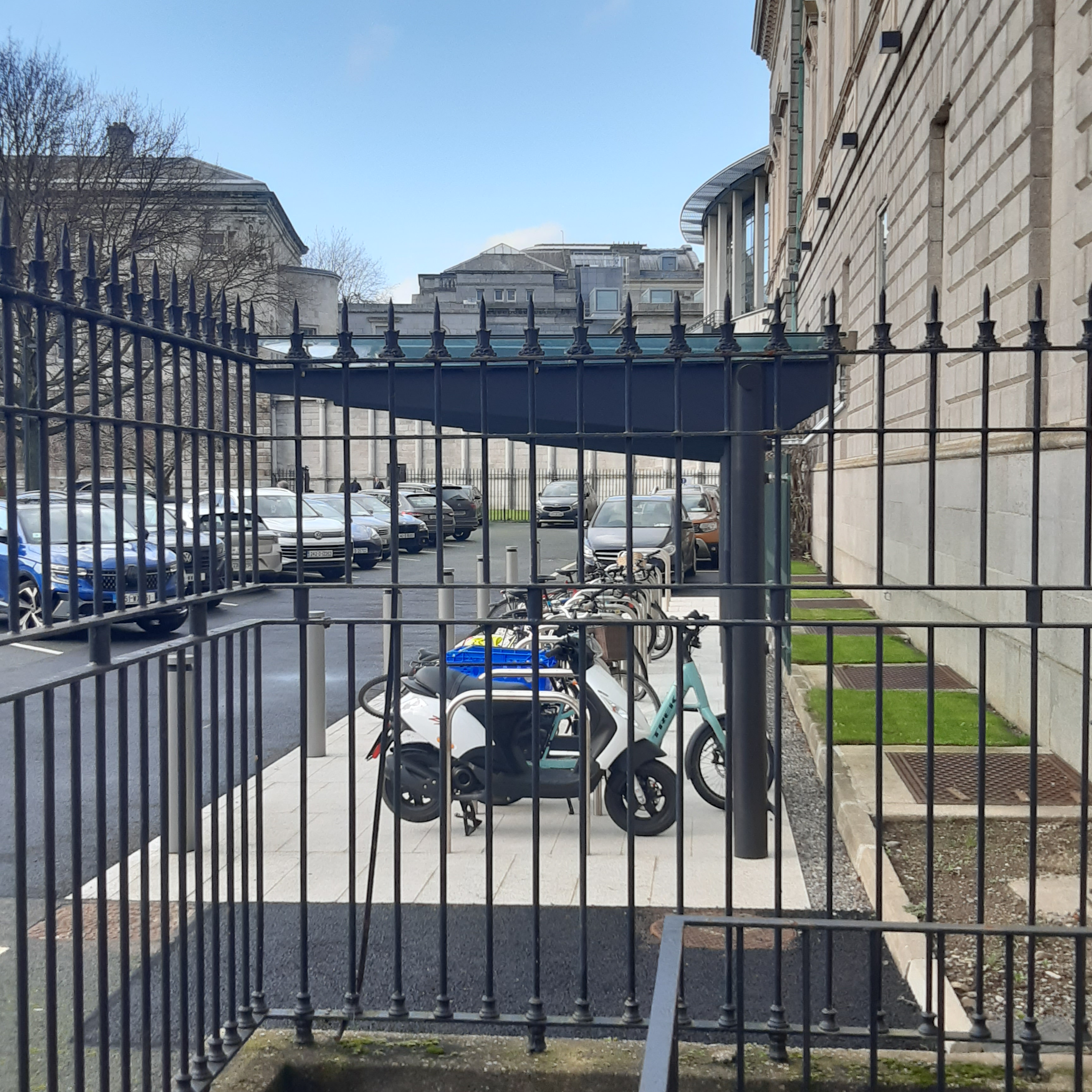
The bike shed, as seen through the railings of the National Gallery of Ireland

The independent radio station Newstalk picked up the story the following day, noting that the Irish Examiner political correspondent Michelle McLean had described the cost as "concerning." Minister for Transport Eamon Ryan, when questioned about the subject on 2 September, replied that "there were questions that need to be answered by the OPW on this", and despite having been "very much in favour of the installation of the bike shed" previously, had only been "made aware of the cost, seemingly, yesterday." McLean added that "at least [the bike shed] will be used," in comparison to the €808,000 Komori printer, bought in 2019, which was found to be too large to fit inside the room in the Dáil where it was intended to be used.

The "infamous bike shelter, or shed" was featured on RTÉ Radio 1's Drivetime programme on 3 September 2024, in which Fianna Fáil TD Paul McAuliffe was interviewed by Cormac Ó hEadhra. Speaking that same day, Public Accounts Committee (PAC) member Marc Ó Cathasaigh said he was "raging about it", adding:

I think it plays into the worst type of stereotypes we have about Irish politics and Irish politicians, that we spend lavish money on things for our politicians. Meanwhile, we can't get basic services in parts of the economy that we need (..) There is nobody who can convince me that the bike shelter we see on the grounds of Leinster House is worth that kind of money. I think there are serious questions to be asked about value for money for the taxpayer, and I absolutely empathise with that frustration.

The Irish Times noted that the cost to build the structure "came in at about twice" what it would typically cost to build a five-star hotel in Ireland per square metre, and about 200 times more expensive than a "flat-pack bike shelter of roughly the same size" that could be bought online. Kieran Cuddihy, presenter of Newstalk's The Hard Shoulder mentioned that the price was comparable to the price of building a three-bedroom house in Dublin, whilst Ó Cathasaigh noted that "a four-bed semi-detached home in Collins Avenue, a "really nice part of Waterford," would also cost €335k."

In an Irish Times article dated 6 September 2024, and titled 'Why did the Leinster House bike shed cost so much and what happens next?', journalist Conor Pope noted that as "public anger mounted" following the previous weeks' exposure of the cost, the OPW stated that it recognised "the importance of ensuring that public money is spent transparently" and defended their costing of the project, as it had involved "several unique challenges" due to its proximity to Leinster House. Pope wrote that "We" (the Irish public) had since found out that the structure "consists of a steel-framed, glazed canopy to ensure long-term durability", composed of Irish granite, glass and steel carefully selected "not only for their durability, but also for their compatibility with the historic setting of our national parliament".

On Newstalk radio, journalist Simon Tierney said that while he agreed the cost of the bike shelter was excessive, he also considered the amount of outrage as excessive, claiming that "If this money had been spent on a new car park, I don't think anyone would have batted an eyelid". Tierney considered that we (the Irish) do not apply the same standards of criticisms to infrastructure involving cars as bicycles.

=== Alternate industry quotes ===
On 4 September 2024, TheJournal.ie noted that Tuam-based company Larkin Engineering Street Products had advertised that they could build a similar bike shed to that at the Dáil "for less than a tenth of the fee paid by the Office of Public Works" at a cost of €19,995, or an even cheaper alternative for €7,000. Stephen Larkin, the general manager of Larkin Engineering, told the online newspaper that "Something (had) gone very wrong in the pricing" for the bike shed at the Dáil:

He added: "Going into a building like Leinster House, you're always going to put a bit of a premium on it, because it's a protected building. "You'll add on maybe 15% due to unforeseen things that might come up, but from chatting to people, the estimation that most people are coming up with for all the work is around €60,000." While Larkin said these estimations do not include the granite flooring of the bike shed, he added: "If you go over the top and add on another €50,000 for granite, you're still only in the region of €110,000."

== Criticism in the Dáil ==
Taoiseach Simon Harris described the price as "inexcusable and inexplicable", adding that it was "the sort of thing that rightly angers and annoys people".

On 18 September 2024, the Dáil returned to session after its summer recess, and the Irish Times noted the issue of the bike shed as one of the political items to "look out for" in the new Dáil term. In his opening remarks on the resumption of the Dáil that same day, the Ceann Comhairle (chairperson of Dáil Éireann) Seán Ó Fearghaíl "strongly criticised" the spending of €336,000 on the bike shelter, adding that it was a "profound embarrassment" for the government and that the public were "justifiably angry". Ó Fearghaíl asked the OPW chairman to attend the next meeting of the Oireachtas Commission to answer questions about the cost, and why the "value for money test was not applied when the huge cost of the shed became clear." He adding that the final figure was "galling for people struggling to pay their bills", and vowed that there would "never be a repeat of such an unwarranted spending of taxpayers' money."

Mr Ó Fearghaíl said that "there were security measures in place because of threatened protests outside", but did not elaborate whether the protests were as a result of the bike shed controversy or not.

On 30 September 2024, the Irish Times reported that the issue of the bike shed, along with housing and immigration concerns, were the Government issues which the public had noticed most in a recent Ipsos Snapshot poll.

== Accountability ==
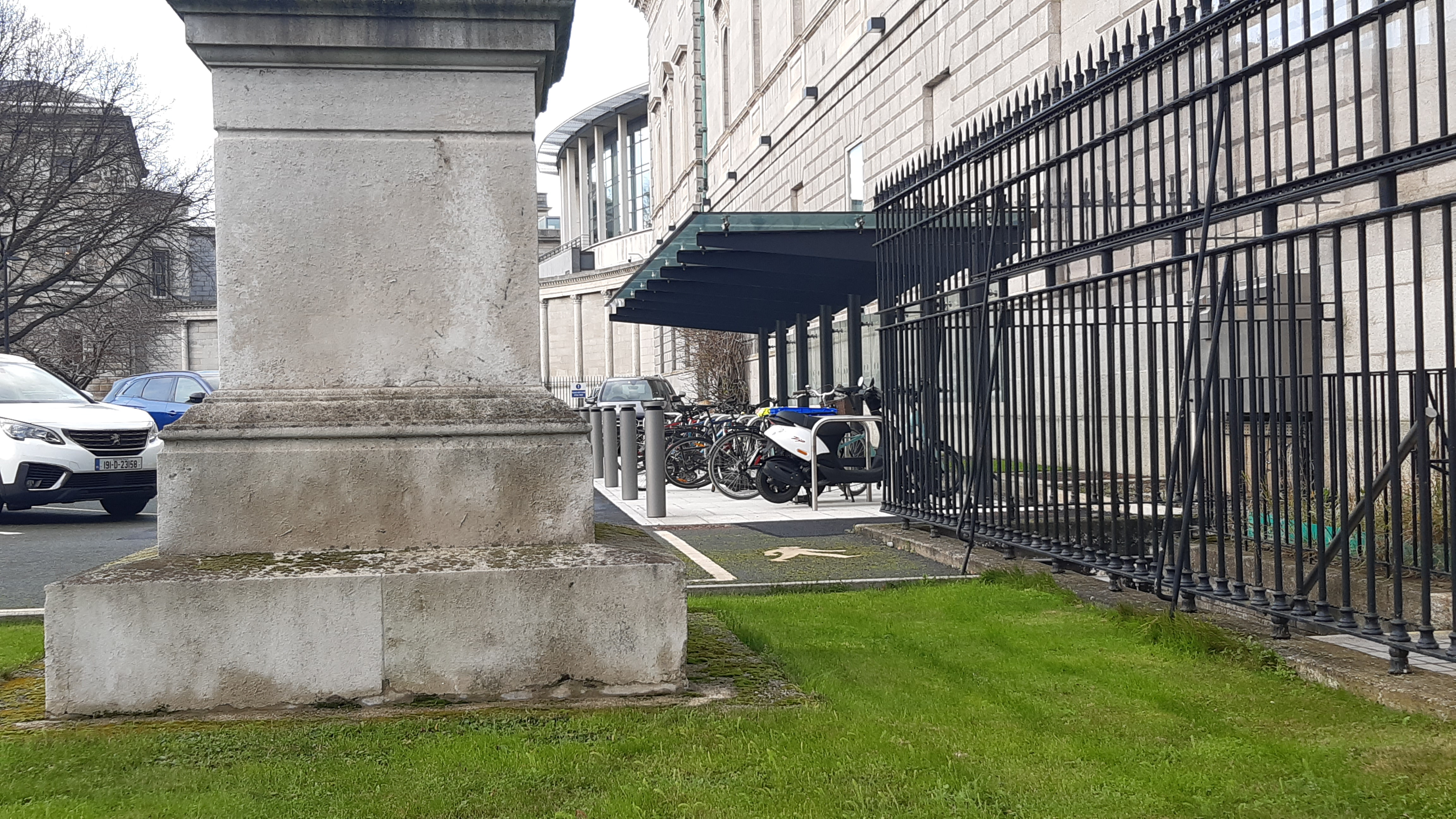
The bike shed, as seen between the base of a statue of Robert Prescott Stewart and the railings of the National Gallery of Ireland

Fine Gael junior minister Patrick O'Donovan, the minister who had "responsibility for the OPW while the Dáil bike shelter was being planned and built", told Newstalk on 4 September 2024 that he "only learned the sky-high price of the deal this week" while reading about it in a newspaper. O'Donovan told reporters that, as minister, he had "no role in signing off on the project", and that ministers "don't sign off on an expenditure within the OPW", adding that the accounting officer goes before the Public Accounts Committee periodically "to be held accountable for expenditure", and expressed support for successor Kieran O'Donnell's decision to request a report into what had happened.

"Ministers don't sign off on an expenditure within the OPW, any more than they do in other Government departments. It's a matter for the accounting officer and the relevant accounting officer at a particular level in the organisation will have looked at that."

— Fine Gael junior minister Patrick O'Donovan

O'Donovan stated that the controversy had "done a lot of damage to the reputation of what is a very good organisation" in the OPW. TheJournal.ie noted that the OPW had been invited to appear before the Oireachtas Public Accounts Committee (PAC) on 10 October 2024 to answer questions about the project.

According to the Irish Times, politicians "disavowed responsibility for the high costs", "pointing the finger" instead at the OPW, who in turn requested consultants at Deloitte to conduct an audit of the controversial project. As of May 2025, their report was expected to be published shortly.

The Irish Independent noted in May 2025 that after the Deloitte report had found there was no value-for-money evaluation done on the project, the Dáil's spending watchdog was "likely to examine the process around public projects like the controversial Leinster House bike shed."

An Oireachtas spokeswoman told RTÉ News in 2024 that although the plan for the provision of a bicycle shelter had been brought before, and approved, by the Oireachtas Commission in June 2021, the "Houses of the Oireachtas Commission had no role in relation to the approval of capital expenditure for the bicycle shelter in Leinster House (and) The cost was not paid from the Commission's budget."

On 24 September 2024, The Irish Examiner noted that John Conlon, the chairman of the OPW, "took responsibility for the controversial spend" ahead of a meeting before the Oireachtas Finance Committee the next day, at which OPW members were expected to be "grilled on the project". Conlon acknowledged that the OPW "could have done better."

== Procedural changes ==
On 24 September 2024, the Office of Public Works published its own internal report into the construction of the bike shed entitled "Review of the Covered Bicycle Parking Project Leinster House". In it, John Conlon, chairman of the organisation, stated that a more "cost-effective" option had initially been proposed by the OPW to the Houses of the Oireachtas Commission (the body responsible for the administration of Leinster House and Government Buildings) in late 2020, but this option had been rejected on security concerns. Conlon acknowledged in the report that "at no point" were the Houses of the Oireachtas Commission informed about what the bike shelter was going to cost.

Prior to the bike shed controversy, "just one person at principal officer level" in the OPW was required to sign off on projects where spending amounted to less than €500,000. These procedures were changed in light of the bike shed scandal.

== See also ==
- Cute hoor, a cultural concept in Ireland where a certain level of corruption is forgiven - or sometimes even applauded - of politicians or businessmen
- Irish political scandals
- National Children's Hospital Ireland, a hospital under construction since 2016 in Dublin that has been the subject of criticism for government mismanagement
