= Michael Ahern (Irish politician) =

Irish former politician (born 1949)

Minister of State
- 2002–2008: Enterprise, Trade and Employment
- 1992–1993: Industry and Commerce

Teachta Dála
- In office February 1982 – February 2011
- Constituency: Cork East

Personal details
- Born: 20 January 1949 (age 77) Cork, Ireland
- Party: Fianna Fáil
- Spouse: Margaret Monahan (m. 1971)
- Children: 3
- Parent: Liam Ahern (father)
- Education: University College Dublin

Michael Ahern (born 20 January 1949) is an Irish former Fianna Fáil politician who served as a Minister of State from 1992 to 1993 and from 2002 to 2008. He served as a Teachta Dála (TD) for the Cork East constituency from 1982 to 2011.

== Early life ==
Michael Ahern was born in Dungourney, County Cork. He was educated at Dungourney National School, Rockwell College, County Tipperary, and University College Dublin where he graduated with a Bachelor of Arts in Economics, Politics and Psychology. He also attended Holy Ghost Missionary College, Kimmage Manor, Dublin, where he studied Theology. For a brief period in the early 1970s, Ahern worked as a secondary school teacher. In 1973, he became an accountancy student at Coopers & Lybrand, Cork. In 1977, he became financial controller with a building construction firm in Cork.

== Personal life ==
He is married to Margaret Monahan and they have three daughters, one of whom, Barbara Ahern, contested the 2016 general election in Cork East for Fianna Fáil unsuccessfully.

Michael Ahern is the son of Liam Ahern, a Senator between 1957 and 1973, and a TD from 1973 until 1974. Ahern's Grand-uncle, John Dinneen, was also a member of the Dáil between 1922 and 1927. Michael Ahern's brother Maurice Ahern was a long-standing Fianna Fáil member of Cork County Council but lost his seat in the 2009 local elections.

== Political career ==
Ahern was first elected to Dáil Éireann at the February 1982 general election and held the until 2011. In 1984, he received his first major promotion when he became Fianna Fáil Deputy spokesperson on Transport in Charles Haughey's front bench. During his career in the Dáil, Ahern has served on a number of committees, including the Public Accounts Committee, the Joint Committee of Health and Children and the Joint Committee on Finance and Public Service. Between 1992 and 1993, he served as Minister of State at the Department of Industry and Commerce with responsibility for Science and Technology. Between 1994 and 1997, he served as Opposition Spokesperson on the Office of Public Works and Taxation. In 2002, Fianna Fáil were re-elected and Ahern was appointed as Minister of State at the Department of Enterprise, Trade and Employment with responsibility for Trade and Commerce.

After the 2007 general election he was appointed as Minister of State at the Department of Enterprise, Trade and Employment with responsibility for Innovation Policy. On 13 May 2008, after Brian Cowen became Taoiseach, Ahern lost his position as Minister of State and was not appointed to any other junior ministry.

He lost his seat at the 2011 general election. He was an unsuccessful candidate for Cork County Council at the 2014 local elections.

== See also ==
- Families in the Oireachtas

== Bibliography ==
- Nealon's Guide to the 30th Dáil and 23rd Seanad, Ed. Stephen Collins, Dublin, 2007

Political offices
| New office | Minister of State for Trade and Commerce; 2002–2007 | Succeeded by John McGuinness |
| New office | Minister of State for Innovation Policy; 2007–2008 | Succeeded by Jimmy Devins |

| Dáil | Election | Deputy (Party) | Deputy (Party) | Deputy (Party) | Deputy (Party) | Deputy (Party) |
|---|---|---|---|---|---|---|
| 4th | 1923 | John Daly (Ind.) | Michael Hennessy (CnaG) | David Kent (Rep) | John Dinneen (FP) | Thomas O'Mahony (CnaG) |
| 4th | 1924 by-election | John Daly (Ind.) | Michael Hennessy (CnaG) | David Kent (Rep) | John Dinneen (FP) | Michael K. Noonan (CnaG) |
| 5th | 1927 (Jun) | John Daly (Ind.) | Michael Hennessy (CnaG) | David Kent (SF) | David O'Gorman (FP) | Martin Corry (FF) |
| 6th | 1927 (Sep) | John Daly (CnaG) | Michael Hennessy (CnaG) | William Kent (FF) | Edmond Carey (CnaG) | Martin Corry (FF) |
| 7th | 1932 | John Daly (CnaG) | William Broderick (CnaG) | Brook Brasier (Ind.) | Patrick Murphy (FF) | Martin Corry (FF) |
| 8th | 1933 | Patrick Daly (CnaG) | William Broderick (CnaG) | William Kent (NCP) | Patrick Murphy (FF) | Martin Corry (FF) |
| 9th | 1937 | Constituency abolished | | | | |

| Dáil | Election | Deputy (Party) | Deputy (Party) | Deputy (Party) |
|---|---|---|---|---|
| 13th | 1948 | Martin Corry (FF) | Patrick O'Gorman (FG) | Seán Keane (Lab) |
| 14th | 1951 | Martin Corry (FF) | Patrick O'Gorman (FG) | Seán Keane (Lab) |
| 14th | 1953 by-election | Martin Corry (FF) | Patrick O'Gorman (FG) | Richard Barry (FG) |
| 15th | 1954 | Martin Corry (FF) | John Moher (FF) | Richard Barry (FG) |
| 16th | 1957 | Martin Corry (FF) | John Moher (FF) | Richard Barry (FG) |
| 17th | 1961 | Constituency abolished | | |

| Dáil | Election | Deputy (Party) | Deputy (Party) | Deputy (Party) | Deputy (Party) |
|---|---|---|---|---|---|
| 22nd | 1981 | Carey Joyce (FF) | Myra Barry (FG) | Patrick Hegarty (FG) | Joe Sherlock (SF–WP) |
| 23rd | 1982 (Feb) | Michael Ahern (FF) | Myra Barry (FG) | Patrick Hegarty (FG) | Joe Sherlock (SF–WP) |
| 24th | 1982 (Nov) | Michael Ahern (FF) | Myra Barry (FG) | Patrick Hegarty (FG) | Ned O'Keeffe (FF) |
| 25th | 1987 | Michael Ahern (FF) | Joe Sherlock (WP) | Patrick Hegarty (FG) | Ned O'Keeffe (FF) |
| 26th | 1989 | Michael Ahern (FF) | Joe Sherlock (WP) | Paul Bradford (FG) | Ned O'Keeffe (FF) |
| 27th | 1992 | Michael Ahern (FF) | John Mulvihill (Lab) | Paul Bradford (FG) | Ned O'Keeffe (FF) |
| 28th | 1997 | Michael Ahern (FF) | David Stanton (FG) | Paul Bradford (FG) | Ned O'Keeffe (FF) |
| 29th | 2002 | Michael Ahern (FF) | David Stanton (FG) | Joe Sherlock (Lab) | Ned O'Keeffe (FF) |
| 30th | 2007 | Michael Ahern (FF) | David Stanton (FG) | Seán Sherlock (Lab) | Ned O'Keeffe (FF) |
| 31st | 2011 | Sandra McLellan (SF) | David Stanton (FG) | Seán Sherlock (Lab) | Tom Barry (FG) |
| 32nd | 2016 | Pat Buckley (SF) | David Stanton (FG) | Seán Sherlock (Lab) | Kevin O'Keeffe (FF) |
| 33rd | 2020 | Pat Buckley (SF) | David Stanton (FG) | Seán Sherlock (Lab) | James O'Connor (FF) |
| 34th | 2024 | Pat Buckley (SF) | Noel McCarthy (FG) | Liam Quaide (SD) | James O'Connor (FF) |
