= Cork North East =

Cork North East or North East Cork may refer to:

- North East Cork (UK Parliament constituency), 1885–1922
- Cork North-East (Dáil constituency), 1961–1981
