= Jerry Cronin =

Irish politician (1925–1990)

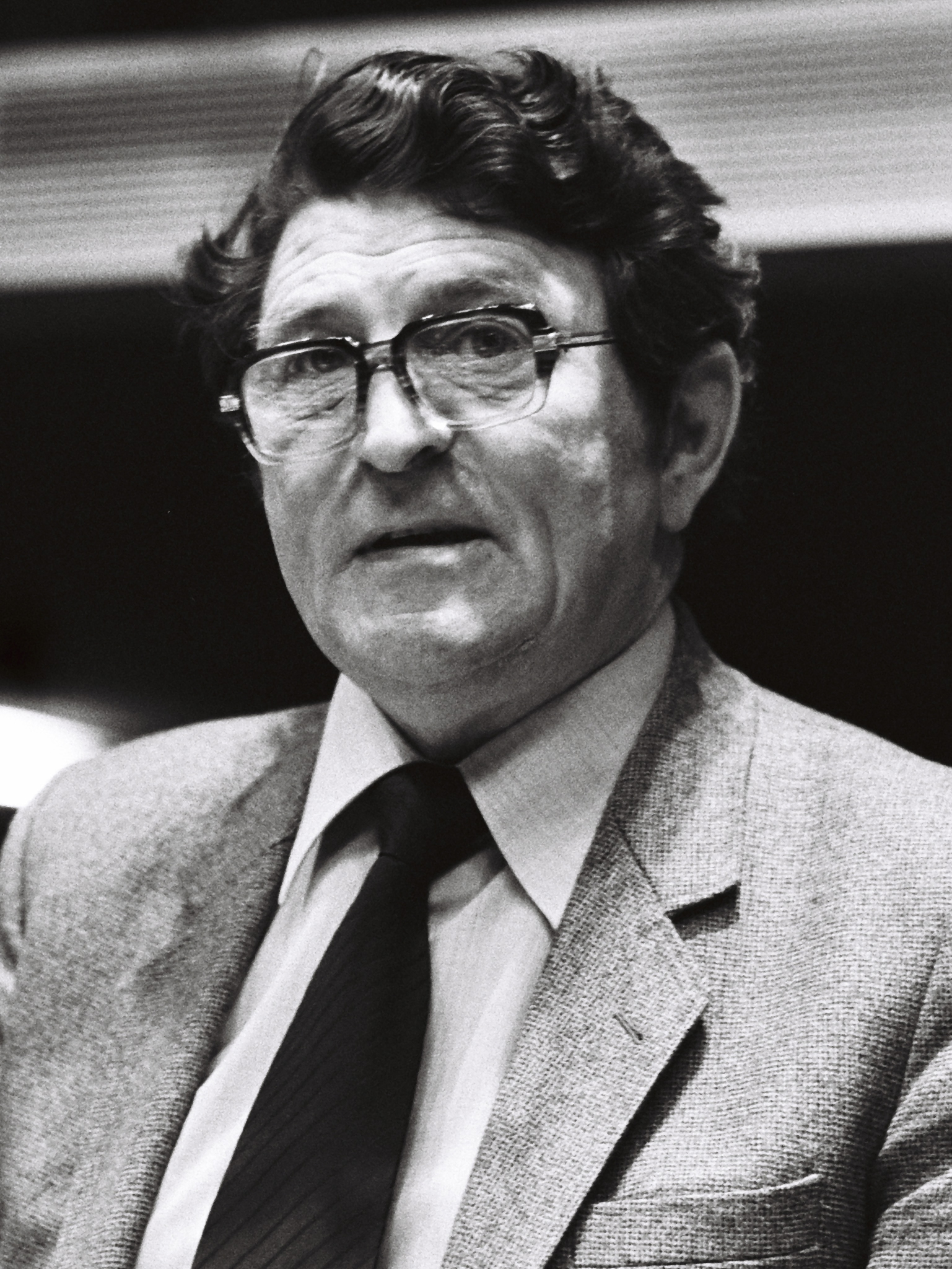
- Cronin in 1980

Minister for Defence
- In office 9 May 1970 – 14 March 1973
- Taoiseach: Jack Lynch
- Preceded by: Jim Gibbons
- Succeeded by: Paddy Donegan

Parliamentary Secretary
- 1969–1970: Agriculture and Fisheries

Teachta Dála
- In office April 1965 – June 1981
- Constituency: Cork North-East

Member of the European Parliament
- In office 7 June 1979 – 24 June 1984
- Constituency: Munster

Personal details
- Born: 14 September 1925 Fermoy, County Cork, Ireland
- Died: 19 October 1990 (aged 65) Cork, Ireland
- Party: Fianna Fáil
- Spouse: Shelia Sheehan (m. 1952)
- Children: 6

Jeremiah Cronin (14 September 1925 – 19 October 1990) was an Irish Fianna Fáil politician who served as Minister for Defence from 1970 to 1973 and Parliamentary Secretary for Agriculture and Fisheries from 1969 to 1970. He served as a Teachta Dála (TD) for the Cork North-East constituency from 1965 to 1981 and a Member of the European Parliament (MEP) for the Munster constituency from 1979 to 1984.

He was born in Currabeha, Fermoy, County Cork, the son of Alice Mulcahy and Sean Cronin. His uncle, Arthur Mulcahy, was a member of the Irish Republican Army, and was shot by British forces during the Irish War of Independence on 22 March 1921. Cronin died on 19 October 1990, having suffered with Parkinson's disease. He was married to Shelia Sheehan; they had lived in Mallow, County Cork, and had six children.

Political offices
| New office | Parliamentary Secretary to the Minister for Agriculture and Fisheries; 1969–1970 | Succeeded by Jackie Fahey |
| Preceded by Jim Gibbons | Minister for Defence; 1970–1973 | Succeeded by Paddy Donegan |

| Dáil | Election | Deputy (Party) | Deputy (Party) | Deputy (Party) | Deputy (Party) | Deputy (Party) |
|---|---|---|---|---|---|---|
| 17th | 1961 | John Moher (FF) | Martin Corry (FF) | Philip Burton (FG) | Richard Barry (FG) | Patrick McAuliffe (Lab) |
| 18th | 1965 | Jerry Cronin (FF) | Martin Corry (FF) | Philip Burton (FG) | Richard Barry (FG) | Patrick McAuliffe (Lab) |
| 19th | 1969 | Jerry Cronin (FF) | Seán Brosnan (FF) | Gerard Cott (FG) | Richard Barry (FG) | 4 seats 1969–1981 |
| 20th | 1973 | Jerry Cronin (FF) | Liam Ahern (FF) | Patrick Hegarty (FG) | Richard Barry (FG) | 4 seats 1969–1981 |
| 20th | 1974 by-election | Jerry Cronin (FF) | Seán Brosnan (FF) | Patrick Hegarty (FG) | Richard Barry (FG) | 4 seats 1969–1981 |
| 21st | 1977 | Jerry Cronin (FF) | Seán Brosnan (FF) | Patrick Hegarty (FG) | Richard Barry (FG) | 4 seats 1969–1981 |
| 21st | 1979 by-election | Jerry Cronin (FF) | Myra Barry (FG) | Patrick Hegarty (FG) | Richard Barry (FG) | 4 seats 1969–1981 |
| 22nd | 1981 | Constituency abolished. See Cork East and Cork North-West | | | | |
