= Liam Ahern =

Irish politician (1916–1974)

Teachta Dála
- In office February 1973 – 13 July 1974
- Constituency: Cork North-East

Senator
- In office 14 December 1961 – 28 February 1973
- Constituency: Administrative Panel
- In office 22 May 1957 – 14 December 1961
- Constituency: Labour Panel

Personal details
- Born: 12 January 1916 County Cork, Ireland
- Died: 13 July 1974 (aged 58) County Cork, Ireland
- Party: Fianna Fáil
- Children: Michael Maurice Ahern
- Relatives: John Dinneen (uncle)

Liam Ahern (12 January 1916 – 13 July 1974) was an Irish Fianna Fáil politician who served in both Dáil Éireann and Seanad Éireann.

== Early and personal life ==
Ahern's father, Eamon Ahern (1882–1953), was a member of Cork County Council from 1919 to 1953. He was a member of the IRA and the IRB. On Eamons' death, Liam was co-opted onto the council. Ahern's uncle, John Dinneen, was also a member of the Dáil between 1922 and 1927. Liam's uncle, Maurice Ahern (1899–1950), was captain of the East Cork 4th Battalion Number One Brigade of the IRA.

Liams' son Michael Ahern was a Fianna Fáil TD for Cork East from 1982 to 2011. Another son, auctioneer Maurice Ahern was a long-standing Fianna Fáil councillor for the Midleton electoral area of Cork County Council from 1979 to 2009. Liam's granddaughter Ann-Marie Ahern is a Fianna Fáil member of Cork County Council since 2020.

== Political career ==
A farmer and agricultural contractor, Ahern was first elected to the 9th Seanad in 1957 on the Labour Panel. In 1961 he was returned to the 10th Seanad on the Administrative Panel, and re-elected by the same panel to the 11th Seanad in 1965.

At the 1969 general election, he stood for election to the 19th Dáil in the Cork North-East constituency, but was narrowly beaten by his Fianna Fáil colleague Seán Brosnan. After his defeat, Ahern was returned to the 12th Seanad by the Administrative Panel.

At the 1973 general election, he again contested Cork North-East, where he came fourth out of the four successful candidates, unseating the sitting Fianna Fáil TD Seán Brosnan. A Fine Gael–Labour Party coalition government under Taoiseach Liam Cosgrave took power at that election, ending a sixteen-year period of Fianna Fáil government, and Ahern found himself in opposition for the first time in his career in the Oireachtas. He caused a minor sensation during the Dáil debate on the seizure of IRA arms on the MV Claudia in May 1973 when he shouted out, "More guns we want, bags of guns."

He died in July 1974, at the age of 58. This triggered a by-election on 13 November 1974, in which his seat was retained for Fianna Fáil by Seán Brosnan.

== See also ==
- Families in the Oireachtas

Dáil	Election	Deputy (Party)	Deputy (Party)	Deputy (Party)	Deputy (Party)	Deputy (Party)
17th	1961	John Moher (FF)	Martin Corry (FF)	Philip Burton (FG)	Richard Barry (FG)	Patrick McAuliffe (Lab)
18th	1965	Jerry Cronin (FF)	Martin Corry (FF)	Philip Burton (FG)	Richard Barry (FG)	Patrick McAuliffe (Lab)
19th	1969	Jerry Cronin (FF)	Seán Brosnan (FF)	Gerard Cott (FG)	Richard Barry (FG)	4 seats 1969–1981
20th	1973	Jerry Cronin (FF)	Liam Ahern (FF)	Patrick Hegarty (FG)	Richard Barry (FG)	4 seats 1969–1981
20th	1974 by-election	Jerry Cronin (FF)	Seán Brosnan (FF)	Patrick Hegarty (FG)	Richard Barry (FG)	4 seats 1969–1981
21st	1977	Jerry Cronin (FF)	Seán Brosnan (FF)	Patrick Hegarty (FG)	Richard Barry (FG)	4 seats 1969–1981
21st	1979 by-election	Jerry Cronin (FF)	Myra Barry (FG)	Patrick Hegarty (FG)	Richard Barry (FG)	4 seats 1969–1981
22nd	1981	Constituency abolished. See Cork East and Cork North-West				
