= Patrick Hegarty =

Irish politician (1926–2002)

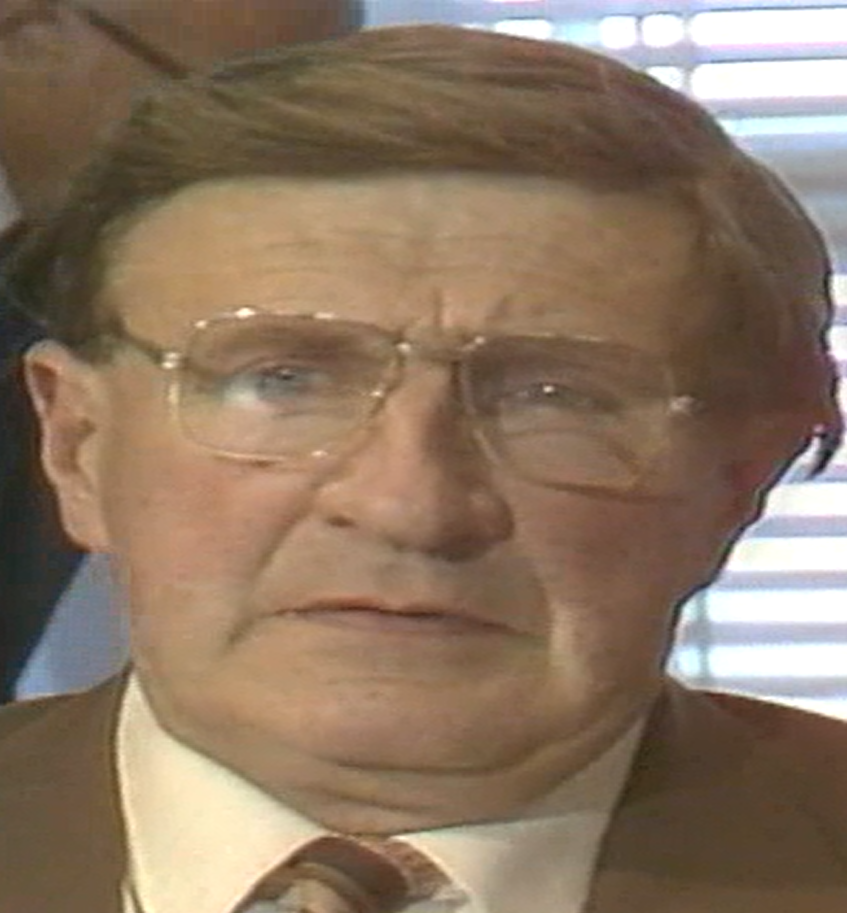
- Hegarty in 1984

Minister of State
- 1986–1987: Industry and Commerce
- 1982–1987: Agriculture

Teachta Dála
- In office June 1981 – June 1989
- Constituency: Cork East
- In office February 1973 – June 1981
- Constituency: Cork North-East

Personal details
- Born: 26 December 1926 County Cork, Ireland
- Died: 31 October 2002 (aged 75) County Cork, Ireland
- Party: Fine Gael

Patrick Hegarty (26 December 1926 – 31 October 2002) was an Irish Fine Gael politician and farmer. He was elected to Dáil Éireann as a Fine Gael Teachta Dála (TD) for the Cork North-East constituency at the 1973 general election, and was re-elected in 1977. In 1981 he was elected for the Cork East constituency, and was re-elected there at each subsequent election until he was defeated at the 1989 general election.

He also stood unsuccessfully as a candidate at the 1992 general election. He was appointed a Minister of State by the Taoiseach Garret FitzGerald, serving as Minister of State at the Department of Agriculture from 1982 to 1987 and Minister of State at the Department of Industry and Commerce from 1986 to 1987.

Political offices
Preceded by Lorcan Allen	Minister of State at the Department of Agriculture; 1982–1987	Office abolished
New office	Minister of State at the Department of Industry and Commerce; 1986–1987	Office abolished

Dáil	Election	Deputy (Party)	Deputy (Party)	Deputy (Party)	Deputy (Party)	Deputy (Party)
17th	1961	John Moher (FF)	Martin Corry (FF)	Philip Burton (FG)	Richard Barry (FG)	Patrick McAuliffe (Lab)
18th	1965	Jerry Cronin (FF)	Martin Corry (FF)	Philip Burton (FG)	Richard Barry (FG)	Patrick McAuliffe (Lab)
19th	1969	Jerry Cronin (FF)	Seán Brosnan (FF)	Gerard Cott (FG)	Richard Barry (FG)	4 seats 1969–1981
20th	1973	Jerry Cronin (FF)	Liam Ahern (FF)	Patrick Hegarty (FG)	Richard Barry (FG)	4 seats 1969–1981
20th	1974 by-election	Jerry Cronin (FF)	Seán Brosnan (FF)	Patrick Hegarty (FG)	Richard Barry (FG)	4 seats 1969–1981
21st	1977	Jerry Cronin (FF)	Seán Brosnan (FF)	Patrick Hegarty (FG)	Richard Barry (FG)	4 seats 1969–1981
21st	1979 by-election	Jerry Cronin (FF)	Myra Barry (FG)	Patrick Hegarty (FG)	Richard Barry (FG)	4 seats 1969–1981
22nd	1981	Constituency abolished. See Cork East and Cork North-West				

Dáil	Election	Deputy (Party)	Deputy (Party)	Deputy (Party)	Deputy (Party)	Deputy (Party)
4th	1923	John Daly (Ind.)	Michael Hennessy (CnaG)	David Kent (Rep)	John Dinneen (FP)	Thomas O'Mahony (CnaG)
4th	1924 by-election	John Daly (Ind.)	Michael Hennessy (CnaG)	David Kent (Rep)	John Dinneen (FP)	Michael K. Noonan (CnaG)
5th	1927 (Jun)	John Daly (Ind.)	Michael Hennessy (CnaG)	David Kent (SF)	David O'Gorman (FP)	Martin Corry (FF)
6th	1927 (Sep)	John Daly (CnaG)	Michael Hennessy (CnaG)	William Kent (FF)	Edmond Carey (CnaG)	Martin Corry (FF)
7th	1932	John Daly (CnaG)	William Broderick (CnaG)	Brook Brasier (Ind.)	Patrick Murphy (FF)	Martin Corry (FF)
8th	1933	Patrick Daly (CnaG)	William Broderick (CnaG)	William Kent (NCP)	Patrick Murphy (FF)	Martin Corry (FF)
9th	1937	Constituency abolished				

Dáil	Election	Deputy (Party)	Deputy (Party)	Deputy (Party)
13th	1948	Martin Corry (FF)	Patrick O'Gorman (FG)	Seán Keane (Lab)
14th	1951	Martin Corry (FF)	Patrick O'Gorman (FG)	Seán Keane (Lab)
14th	1953 by-election	Martin Corry (FF)	Patrick O'Gorman (FG)	Richard Barry (FG)
15th	1954	Martin Corry (FF)	John Moher (FF)	Richard Barry (FG)
16th	1957	Martin Corry (FF)	John Moher (FF)	Richard Barry (FG)
17th	1961	Constituency abolished		

Dáil	Election	Deputy (Party)	Deputy (Party)	Deputy (Party)	Deputy (Party)
22nd	1981	Carey Joyce (FF)	Myra Barry (FG)	Patrick Hegarty (FG)	Joe Sherlock (SF–WP)
23rd	1982 (Feb)	Michael Ahern (FF)	Myra Barry (FG)	Patrick Hegarty (FG)	Joe Sherlock (SF–WP)
24th	1982 (Nov)	Michael Ahern (FF)	Myra Barry (FG)	Patrick Hegarty (FG)	Ned O'Keeffe (FF)
25th	1987	Michael Ahern (FF)	Joe Sherlock (WP)	Patrick Hegarty (FG)	Ned O'Keeffe (FF)
26th	1989	Michael Ahern (FF)	Joe Sherlock (WP)	Paul Bradford (FG)	Ned O'Keeffe (FF)
27th	1992	Michael Ahern (FF)	John Mulvihill (Lab)	Paul Bradford (FG)	Ned O'Keeffe (FF)
28th	1997	Michael Ahern (FF)	David Stanton (FG)	Paul Bradford (FG)	Ned O'Keeffe (FF)
29th	2002	Michael Ahern (FF)	David Stanton (FG)	Joe Sherlock (Lab)	Ned O'Keeffe (FF)
30th	2007	Michael Ahern (FF)	David Stanton (FG)	Seán Sherlock (Lab)	Ned O'Keeffe (FF)
31st	2011	Sandra McLellan (SF)	David Stanton (FG)	Seán Sherlock (Lab)	Tom Barry (FG)
32nd	2016	Pat Buckley (SF)	David Stanton (FG)	Seán Sherlock (Lab)	Kevin O'Keeffe (FF)
33rd	2020	Pat Buckley (SF)	David Stanton (FG)	Seán Sherlock (Lab)	James O'Connor (FF)
34th	2024	Pat Buckley (SF)	Noel McCarthy (FG)	Liam Quaide (SD)	James O'Connor (FF)
