= 1974 Cork North-East by-election =

By-election to the 20th Dáil

- 13 November 1974
- Turnout: 40,374 (72.2%)
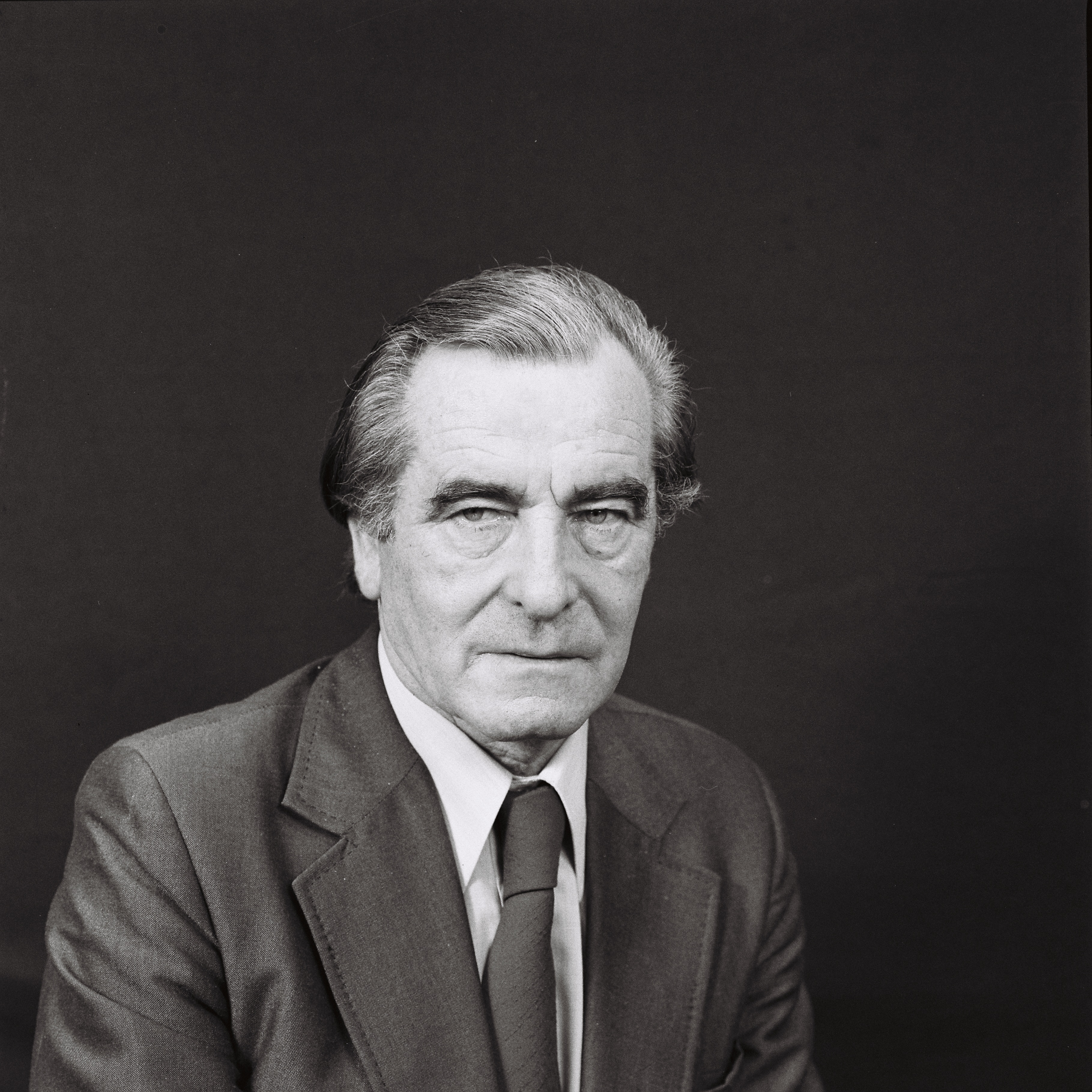

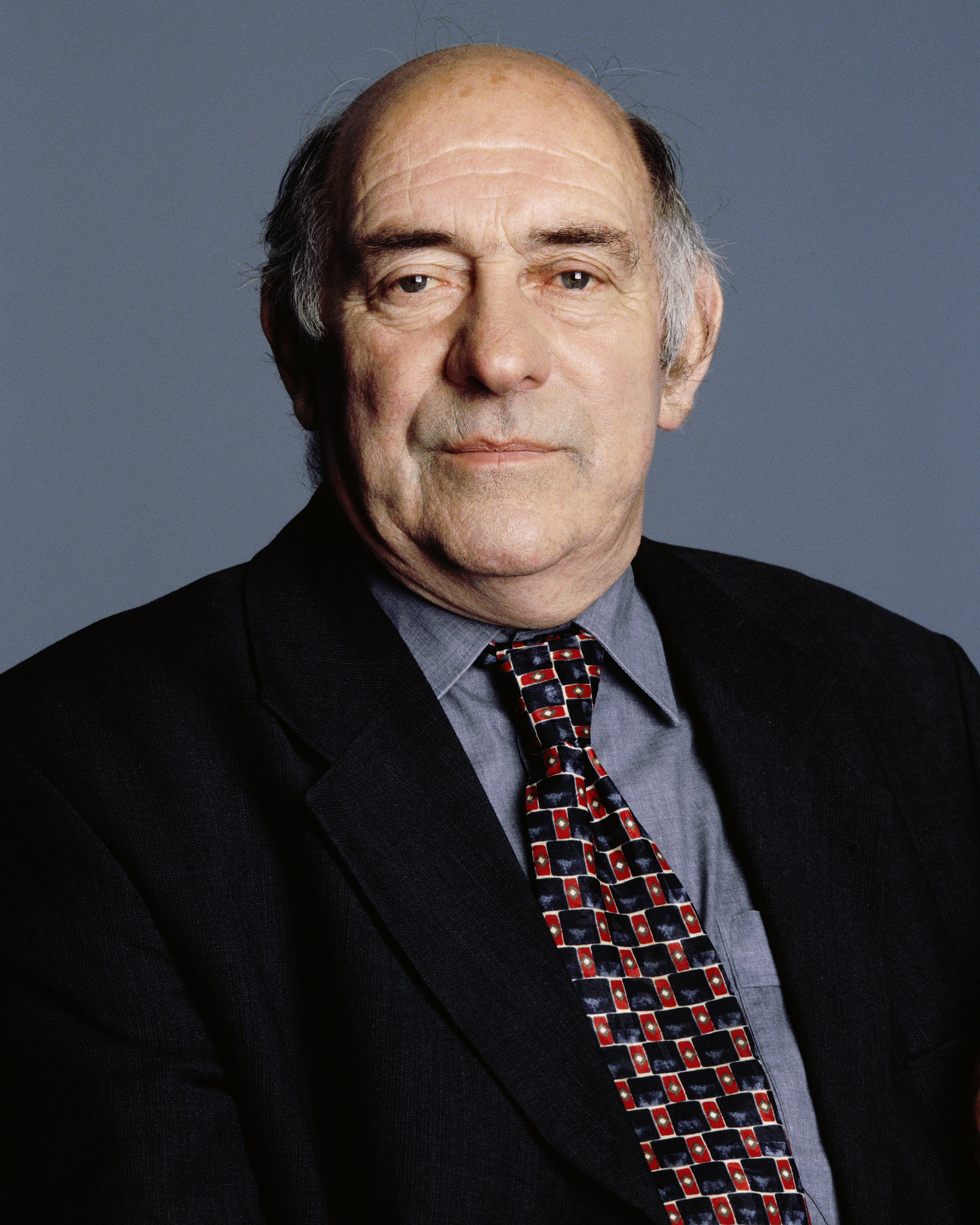
		Broderick
Nominee	Seán Brosnan	Michael Broderick	Joe Sherlock
Party	Fianna Fáil	Fine Gael	Official Sinn Féin
First preferences	19,928	13,708	5,363
Percentage	49.4%	34.0%	13.3%
Final count	21,912	16,330	–
TD before election
Liam Ahern
Fianna Fáil
TD after election
Seán Brosnan
Fianna Fáil

A Dáil by-election was held in the constituency of Cork North-East in Ireland on Wednesday, 13 November 1974, to fill a vacancy in the 20th Dáil. It followed the death of Fianna Fáil Teachta Dála (TD) Liam Ahern on 13 July 1974.

The writ of election to fill the vacancy was agreed by the Dáil on 23 October 1974.

The by-election was won by the Fianna Fáil candidate Seán Brosnan.

== Result ==
1974 Cork North-East by-election
Party	Candidate	FPv%	Count		
Party	Candidate	FPv%	1	2	3
Fianna Fáil	Seán Brosnan	49.4	19,928	20,031	21,912
Fine Gael	Michael Broderick	34.0	13,708	14,561	16,330
Official Sinn Féin	Joe Sherlock	13.3	5,363	5,659	
Labour	Liam Hurley	3.1	1,243		
Independent	Angela Cunningham	0.3	132		
Electorate: 55,388 Valid: 40,374 Quota: 20,188 Turnout: 72.2%
