= Seán Brosnan =

Irish politician (1916–1979)

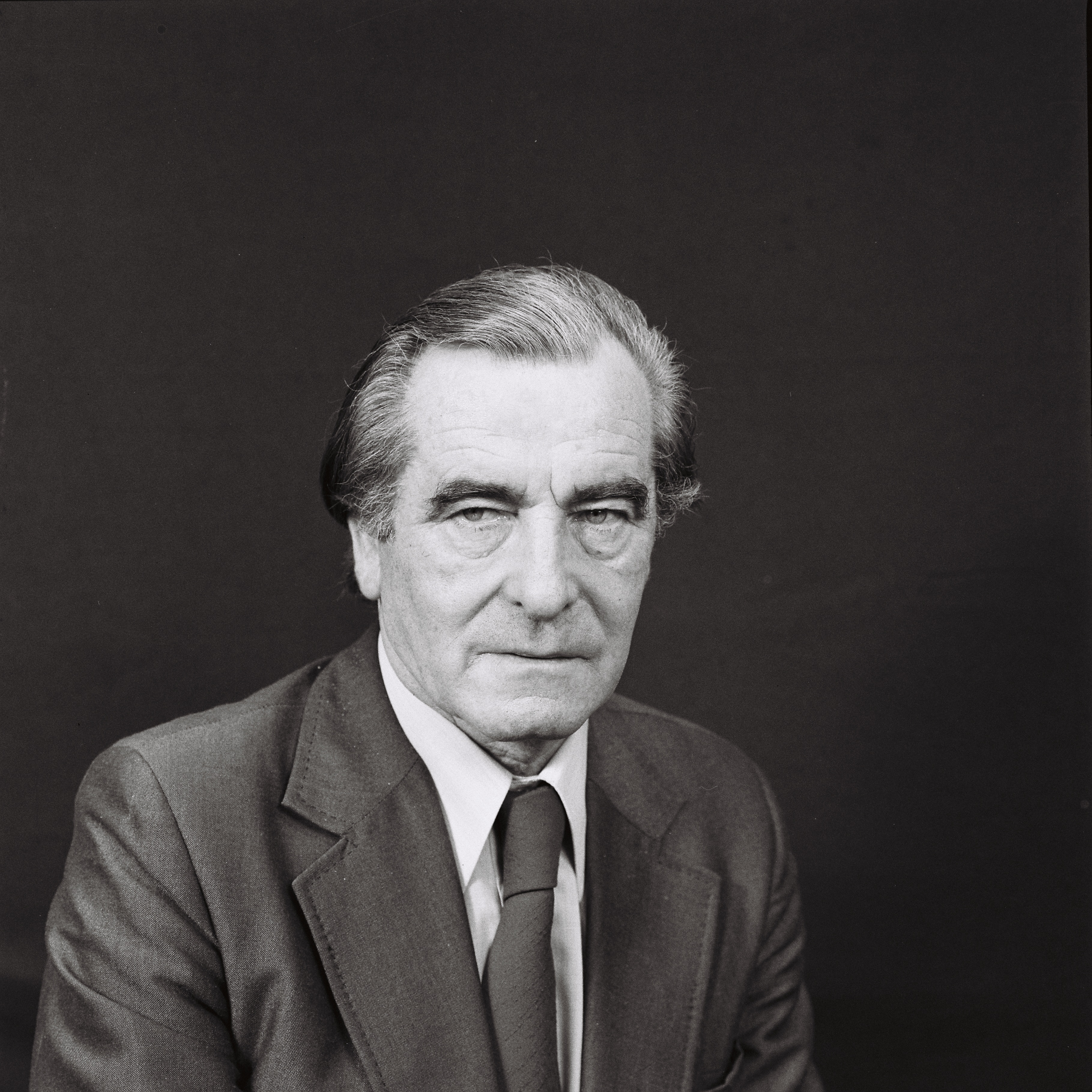

Teachta Dála
- In office November 1974 – 18 April 1979
- In office June 1969 – February 1973
- Constituency: Cork North-East

Senator
- In office 1 June 1973 – 13 November 1974
- Constituency: Administrative Panel

Member of the European Parliament
- In office December 1977 – April 1979
- Constituency: Oireachtas Delegation

Personal details
- Born: 21 December 1916 Dingle, County Kerry, Ireland
- Died: 18 April 1979 (aged 62) County Cork, Ireland
- Party: Fianna Fáil

Seán Michael Brosnan (21 December 1916 – 18 April 1979) was an Irish barrister and Fianna Fáil politician. He served for 10 years in the Oireachtas, as a Teachta Dála (TD) and as a senator.

Brosnan was a native of Dingle, County Kerry. He was a prominent Gaelic footballer and won 3 All-Ireland medals with Kerry. In 1939, he was captain of the team but could not play in the final due to influenza.

In 1933, he won an All-Ireland Minor Football Championship with Kerry. He won senior Kerry County Championship medals with Dingle GAA in 1938 and 1941. He left Dingle in the autumn of 1939.

At the 1969 general election, Brosnan was elected to the 19th Dáil as a TD for Cork North-East. It was his second attempt – he had been defeated in 1965 – and he lost his seat at the 1973 general election. He was then elected to the 13th Seanad Éireann on the Administrative Panel, but he regained his Dáil seat in a by-election in November 1974 after the death of his Fianna Fáil colleague Liam Ahern.

Brosnan was re-elected at the 1977 general election to the 21st Dáil, and also served as a Member of the European Parliament (MEP). MEPs were at that time appointed by national parliaments rather than being elected, and Brosnan was one of a 10-member delegation from the Oireachtas until the first direct elections in 1979.

After his death in 1979, the resulting by-election on 7 November was won for Fine Gael by Myra Barry.

Sporting positions
Preceded by Tom O'Connor	Kerry Senior Football Captain; 1939	Succeeded by Tom O'Connor

Dáil	Election	Deputy (Party)	Deputy (Party)	Deputy (Party)	Deputy (Party)	Deputy (Party)
17th	1961	John Moher (FF)	Martin Corry (FF)	Philip Burton (FG)	Richard Barry (FG)	Patrick McAuliffe (Lab)
18th	1965	Jerry Cronin (FF)	Martin Corry (FF)	Philip Burton (FG)	Richard Barry (FG)	Patrick McAuliffe (Lab)
19th	1969	Jerry Cronin (FF)	Seán Brosnan (FF)	Gerard Cott (FG)	Richard Barry (FG)	4 seats 1969–1981
20th	1973	Jerry Cronin (FF)	Liam Ahern (FF)	Patrick Hegarty (FG)	Richard Barry (FG)	4 seats 1969–1981
20th	1974 by-election	Jerry Cronin (FF)	Seán Brosnan (FF)	Patrick Hegarty (FG)	Richard Barry (FG)	4 seats 1969–1981
21st	1977	Jerry Cronin (FF)	Seán Brosnan (FF)	Patrick Hegarty (FG)	Richard Barry (FG)	4 seats 1969–1981
21st	1979 by-election	Jerry Cronin (FF)	Myra Barry (FG)	Patrick Hegarty (FG)	Richard Barry (FG)	4 seats 1969–1981
22nd	1981	Constituency abolished. See Cork East and Cork North-West				
