= Gerard Cott =

Irish politician (1940–2023)

Teachta Dála
- In office June 1969 – February 1973
- Constituency: Cork North-East

Personal details
- Born: 30 April 1940 County Cork, Ireland
- Died: 1 July 2023 (aged 83) County Cork, Ireland
- Party: Fine Gael
- Spouse: Denise Egan
- Children: 5

Gerard Cott (30 April 1940 – 1 July 2023) was an Irish Fine Gael politician and secondary teacher. He was elected to Dáil Éireann for the Cork North-East constituency at the 1969 general election. He did not contest the 1973 general election.

Cott was married to Denise (née Egan), and they had five children. He died in County Cork on 1 July 2023, at the age of 83.

Dáil	Election	Deputy (Party)	Deputy (Party)	Deputy (Party)	Deputy (Party)	Deputy (Party)
17th	1961	John Moher (FF)	Martin Corry (FF)	Philip Burton (FG)	Richard Barry (FG)	Patrick McAuliffe (Lab)
18th	1965	Jerry Cronin (FF)	Martin Corry (FF)	Philip Burton (FG)	Richard Barry (FG)	Patrick McAuliffe (Lab)
19th	1969	Jerry Cronin (FF)	Seán Brosnan (FF)	Gerard Cott (FG)	Richard Barry (FG)	4 seats 1969–1981
20th	1973	Jerry Cronin (FF)	Liam Ahern (FF)	Patrick Hegarty (FG)	Richard Barry (FG)	4 seats 1969–1981
20th	1974 by-election	Jerry Cronin (FF)	Seán Brosnan (FF)	Patrick Hegarty (FG)	Richard Barry (FG)	4 seats 1969–1981
21st	1977	Jerry Cronin (FF)	Seán Brosnan (FF)	Patrick Hegarty (FG)	Richard Barry (FG)	4 seats 1969–1981
21st	1979 by-election	Jerry Cronin (FF)	Myra Barry (FG)	Patrick Hegarty (FG)	Richard Barry (FG)	4 seats 1969–1981
22nd	1981	Constituency abolished. See Cork East and Cork North-West				
