= Cute hoor =

Hiberno-English phrase and Irish cultural concept

Cute hoor and, by extension, "cute hoorism", is a cultural concept in Ireland where a certain level of corruption is forgiven – or sometimes even applauded – of politicians or businessmen. This phenomenon is sometimes attributed to postcolonialism and emigration in Ireland, but also to how historically passive income and patronage were favoured, in culture and in public policy, over entrepreneurship. But the concept also references how years of net emigration had led to a situation where having a network of powerful contacts created more opportunities for a school or college leaver than work ethic, talent or academic achievement.

Cute hoorism in politics has also come to refer to the phenomenon where, because of Ireland's multi-seat constituency proportional representation, single transferable vote system, political candidates often face more of a threat in re-election from a running mate in their party than from a rival in a party with substantially different political policies. Typically, a successful method of besting a rival with identical political beliefs is by being seen to be better at dealing with parish pump issues.

However, the phrase "cute hoor" is used more widely than this in politics in Ireland, particularly when referring to cynical tactics in general, such as the difference between pre-election campaigning and post-election coalition-forming.

== Etymology ==
The phrase "cute hoor" is exemplary in Hiberno-English as it represents three different categories of the dialect: an English word with a distinct meaning in Ireland (cute, meaning shrewd), an Irish neologism in English based on Irish phonetics (hoor, derived from whore) and a compound phrase with a distinct meaning of its own (cute hoor). In the entry for "hoor", Dolan notes "it may be used affectionately as well as pejoratively, especially when qualified by the adjective 'cute'... 'that man's such a cute hoor he'd build a nest in your ear'".

The distinction between "whore" and "hoor" was significant enough for a discussion about it to be entered into Ireland's parliamentary record.

== History ==
On 10 March 1983, the Evening Herald ran an article on Terry Leyden (with reference to him and his running mate Seán Doherty) in which the phrase was first used in print:

"Few politicians understand the punters better than either. In local parlance they are cute "hoors". But it is hard to say which is the cutest.... in spite of national swings against Fianna Fáil they have managed to hold onto two out of the three seats n Roscommon over the past four elections.... If their political know-how could be repeated by Fianna Fail in other marginals Charlie Haughey would never have lost power."

A few months later, 'cute hoor' was first entered in the Dáil record on 3 July 1983 by George Birmingham:

"When the choice is presented to them between leadership and stroking, between courage and cowardice, vision and the philosophy of "the cute hoor", I have no doubt as to whom they will choose. The people have enough confidence in themselves to respond to leadership which is and will be on offer in 15 months' time."

In both instances, the implication (by rival politicians and journalists) was that cute hoor politicians had improved their careers by prioritising local concerns over the national interest. The phrase accelerated in use during the 1980s and 1990s when repeated coalition governments collapsed after corruption scandals or because the support of independent politicians was withdrawn.

== Re-election of controversial politicians ==
While politics in Ireland in the 1990s was focused on high-minded goals such as building the Celtic Tiger and the Peace process, at the ground level matters relating to political corruption were collapsing governments and being discussed in election debates. Many issues relating to corruption in planning and public procurement were investigated by tribunals such as the Moriarty Tribunal or the Mahon Tribunal. However, these tribunals did not often lead to criminal convictions and many politicians identified as having acted in an improper manner not only were re-elected but were in a position to leverage a coalition as an independent T.D.

The following are examples where the term has been applied in the Irish media in reference to a politician being re-elected after a controversy.

=== Michael Lowry ===
The 1997 McCracken Tribunal revealed that supermarket tycoon Ben Dunne had paid IR£395,000 for an extension to Michael Lowry's home in Tipperary. The Tribunal concluded that Lowry had evaded tax. This allegation prompted his resignation from the Cabinet in November 1996. Taoiseach John Bruton announced that Lowry would not be allowed to stand as a Fine Gael candidate at the next election, and he resigned from the party.

Lowry announced that he would stand as an independent candidate at the 1997 general election. He topped the poll in his Tipperary North constituency at that election, doing so again at the 2002, 2007 and 2011 general elections, and yet again in Tipperary at the general elections of 2016 and 2020.

=== Mick Wallace ===
Mick Wallace, an Independent TD, refused to resign his seat after admitting to tax evasion in 2012, stating “I am answerable to the people of Wexford who elected me, and they will discard me when they see fit”. He was re-elected in 2016.

=== Boris Johnson ===
In 2019, The Irish Times asked if Boris Johnson was Britain's first cute hoor Prime Minister, noting "Swap a hurl for a cricket bat, the word “Brussels” for “Dublin”, and Johnson would be right at home in a back bar in south Kerry, waging a derisory finger at “them up in Dublin” with one hand and knocking back a pint with the other. Their electorate is the same - tired of being condescended to by elites in a remote city, they respond well to a sly dog who they reckon can get them a good deal".

== Supporting a party in governing after resigning from that party ==
The following politicians resigned from a political party but later supported that party in government in exchange for leverage:

=== Jackie Healy-Rae ===
When Fianna Fáil refused to nominate Jackie Healy-Rae as a candidate in Kerry South, he decided to run as an Independent candidate in 1997. This move surprised the party, with many commentators giving him little chance of getting elected. However, Healy-Rae took a seat and denied Fianna Fáil the chance of taking a second seat in the constituency. However, once elected he was in a better negotiating position with the Fianna Fáil-led coalition as an independent than he would have been as a government backbencher. Healy-Rae was one of four Independent TDs (the others were Harry Blaney, Tom Gildea and Mildred Fox) who supported the government throughout its five-year term. In return for this support he secured funding for projects in his constituency and chairmanship of the Environment committee. Many of the projects, such as road improvements, involved contracts or contract lots tendered by Kerry County Council being awarded to Healy-Rae's plant-hire business.

Healy-Rae's high profile and perceived influence over the government received much coverage, and in the next general election fifteen independent TDs were returned to Dáil Éireann.

Mattie McGrath - former member of Fianna Fáil

Shane Ross - former member of Fine Gael

== Advancing local interests ==
The issue of making decisions as a government minister which benefit that minister's own constituency is a controversial one, because elected representatives from disadvantaged areas are expected to seek additional services or investment in that area. However, when this is done egregiously it is seen as a symptom of cute hoor politics.

=== Tom Parlon ===
In December 2003, Tom Parlon was attacked by other government politicians for claiming the controversial civil service decentralisation plan being implemented was because of his decision, when in fact he had no input into the plan at all and was only a junior by-stander. Parlon, with advance knowledge, erected prominent "Welcome to Parlon country" posters in his constituency as soon as the announcement was made. Also in taking up his position as Director General of the Construction Industry Federation in 2007, after having a prominent position in the Office of Public Works, led to accusations of a conflict of interest.

In 2008, Parlon publicly took credit for effecting a policy reversal by the Department of Finance on the procurement procedure for State building projects. After his lobbying, Minister for Finance Brian Lenihan agreed to allow €150m of water service projects to go ahead under old "costs plus" contracts rather than the "fixed price" contracts. In fact, the reversal was due to an administrative decision amongst local authorities and not as a consequence of any lobbying.
