= Cork North-East (Dáil constituency) =

Dáil constituency (1961–1981)

- Former Dáil constituency

Former constituency
- Created: 1961
- Abolished: 1981
- Seats: 5 (1961–1969); 4 (1969–1981)
- Local government area: County Cork
- Created from: Cork North
- Replaced by: Cork East; Cork North-West

Cork North-East was a parliamentary constituency represented in Dáil Éireann, the lower house of the Irish parliament or Oireachtas from 1961 to 1981. The constituency elected 5 deputies (Teachtaí Dála, commonly known as TDs) to the Dáil until 1969, and then 4 thereafter. The method of election was proportional representation by means of the single transferable vote (PR-STV).

== History ==
The constituency was created under the Electoral (Amendment) Act 1961, for the 1961 general election to Dáil Éireann. The constituency returned 5 deputies from 1961 to 1969. Under the Electoral (Amendment) Act 1969 this was reduced to 4 seats from 1969 onwards.

It was abolished under the Electoral (Amendment) Act 1980, when it was partially replaced by the new constituencies of Cork East and Cork North-West.

== Boundaries ==
The district electoral divisions of the former Rural District of Fermoy; former rural district of Kanturk; former rural district of Mallow; former rural district of Midleton; former rural district of Mitchelstown No. 1; former rural district of Youghal; and the urban districts of Cobh, Fermoy, Mallow, Midleton and Youghal.

== TDs ==
Teachtaí Dála (TDs) for Cork North-East 1961–1981
Key to parties: FG = Fine Gael; FF = Fianna Fáil; Lab = Labour
Dáil	Election	Deputy (Party)	Deputy (Party)	Deputy (Party)	Deputy (Party)	Deputy (Party)
17th	1961	John Moher (FF)	Martin Corry (FF)	Philip Burton (FG)	Richard Barry (FG)	Patrick McAuliffe (Lab)
18th	1965	Jerry Cronin (FF)	Martin Corry (FF)	Philip Burton (FG)	Richard Barry (FG)	Patrick McAuliffe (Lab)
19th	1969	Jerry Cronin (FF)	Seán Brosnan (FF)	Gerard Cott (FG)	Richard Barry (FG)	4 seats 1969–1981
20th	1973	Jerry Cronin (FF)	Liam Ahern (FF)	Patrick Hegarty (FG)	Richard Barry (FG)	4 seats 1969–1981
20th	1974 by-election	Jerry Cronin (FF)	Seán Brosnan (FF)	Patrick Hegarty (FG)	Richard Barry (FG)	4 seats 1969–1981
21st	1977	Jerry Cronin (FF)	Seán Brosnan (FF)	Patrick Hegarty (FG)	Richard Barry (FG)	4 seats 1969–1981
21st	1979 by-election	Jerry Cronin (FF)	Myra Barry (FG)	Patrick Hegarty (FG)	Richard Barry (FG)	4 seats 1969–1981
22nd	1981	Constituency abolished. See Cork East and Cork North-West				

Note: The columns in this table are used only for presentational purposes, and no significance should be attached to the order of columns. For details of the order in which seats were won at each election, see the detailed results of that election.

== Elections ==
*: Outgoing TD

=== 1979 by-election ===
Following the death of Fianna Fáil TD Seán Brosnan, a by-election was held on 7 November 1979. The seat was won by the Fine Gael candidate Myra Barry.

1979 by-election: Cork North-East
Party	Candidate	FPv%	Count	
Party	Candidate	FPv%	1	2
Fine Gael	Myra Barry	38.7	15,939	20,292
Fianna Fáil	John Brosnan	36.3	14,961	17,883
Sinn Féin The Workers' Party	Joe Sherlock	22.8	9,395	
Independent	Mary Ann Duggan	2.2	911	
Electorate: 60,075 Valid: 41,206 Quota: 20,604 Turnout: 68.6%

=== 1977 general election ===
1977 general election: Cork North-East
Party	Candidate	FPv%	Count						
Party	Candidate	FPv%	1	2	3	4	5	6	7
Fianna Fáil	Seán Brosnan	18.7	8,840	8,986	9,025	9,078	9,788		
Fianna Fáil	Jerry Cronin	17.6	8,352	8,440	8,501	8,632	8,828	10,221	
Fine Gael	Richard Barry	16.0	7,590	7,628	7,864	9,024	9,382	10,296	
Fine Gael	Patrick Hegarty	12.9	6,117	6,260	6,727	7,251	7,863	8,367	8,667
Fianna Fáil	Carey Joyce	11.9	5,630	5,661	5,684	5,706	5,825	6,608	6,719
Sinn Féin The Workers' Party	Joe Sherlock	9.5	4,485	4,584	4,765	4,925	5,252		
Independent	Noel Collins	5.1	2,433	2,488	2,560	2,600			
Fine Gael	Michael Broderick	4.3	2,036	2,047	2,161				
Labour	Liam Duggan	2.3	1,094	1,288					
Independent	John Kidney	1.7	788						
Electorate: 59,115 Valid: 47,365 Quota: 9,474 Turnout: 80.1%

=== 1974 by-election ===
Following the death of Fianna Fáil TD Liam Ahern, a by-election was held on 13 November 1974. The seat was won by the Fianna Fáil candidate Seán Brosnan.

1974 by-election: Cork North-East
Party	Candidate	FPv%	Count		
Party	Candidate	FPv%	1	2	3
Fianna Fáil	Seán Brosnan	49.4	19,928	20,031	21,912
Fine Gael	Michael Broderick	34.0	13,708	14,561	16,330
Official Sinn Féin	Joe Sherlock	13.3	5,363	5,659	
Labour	Liam Hurley	3.1	1,243		
Independent	Angela Cunningham	0.3	132		
Electorate: 55,388 Valid: 40,374 Quota: 20,188 Turnout: 72.2%

=== 1973 general election ===
1973 general election: Cork North-East
Party	Candidate	FPv%	Count						
Party	Candidate	FPv%	1	2	3	4	5	6	7
Fianna Fáil	Jerry Cronin	24.0	9,608						
Fine Gael	Richard Barry	18.0	7,188	7,270	7,281	7,477	8,122		
Fianna Fáil	Liam Ahern	13.5	5,403	5,946	5,963	6,098	6,169	6,470	6,671
Fianna Fáil	Seán Brosnan	12.6	5,029	5,778	5,790	5,917	5,994	6,296	6,485
Fine Gael	Patrick Hegarty	10.2	4,066	4,082	4,102	4,511	5,085	5,474	7,961
Fine Gael	Michael Broderick	7.5	2,994	3,055	3,057	3,101	3,328	4,230	
Sinn Féin	Joe Sherlock	6.2	2,488	2,608	2,629	2,707	3,071		
Labour	William Fennessy	4.7	1,887	1,914	1,923	2,093			
Independent	Noel Collins	3.0	1,228	1,237	1,240				
Independent	Cuthbert Kelly	0.3	100	102					
Electorate: 50,016 Valid: 39,991 Quota: 7,999 Turnout: 80.0%

=== 1969 general election ===
1969 general election: Cork North-East
Party	Candidate	FPv%	Count						
Party	Candidate	FPv%	1	2	3	4	5	6	7
Fianna Fáil	Jerry Cronin	23.0	8,842						
Fine Gael	Richard Barry	18.6	7,133	7,202	7,588	7,654	9,127		
Fianna Fáil	Seán Brosnan	13.7	5,281	5,731	5,831	5,908	5,945	5,959	6,363
Fianna Fáil	Liam Ahern	13.2	5,050	5,504	5,583	5,669	5,704	5,715	6,044
Labour	Patrick McAuliffe	8.7	3,335	3,462	3,560	4,800	5,123	5,197	
Fine Gael	Gerard Cott	8.2	3,162	3,165	3,858	4,038	4,531	5,616	6,373
Fine Gael	Jeremiah O'Hanlon	6.1	2,354	2,398	2,477	2,512			
Labour	Donie O'Driscoll	4.4	1,687	1,695	1,763				
Fine Gael	Daniel Casey	4.1	1,566	1,570					
Electorate: 48,840 Valid: 38,410 Quota: 7,683 Turnout: 78.6%

=== 1965 general election ===
1965 general election: Cork North-East
Party	Candidate	FPv%	Count					
Party	Candidate	FPv%	1	2	3	4	5	6
Fine Gael	Richard Barry	17.4	8,007					
Labour	Patrick McAuliffe	15.3	7,013	7,045	7,084	7,505	7,919	
Fianna Fáil	Martin Corry	14.7	6,753	6,762	6,778	7,052	9,543	
Fianna Fáil	Jerry Cronin	12.9	5,919	5,932	5,950	5,985	6,693	7,471
Fine Gael	Philip Burton	10.8	4,949	5,113	5,183	7,610	7,857	
Fianna Fáil	John Moher	10.7	4,905	4,924	4,956	4,992	5,588	6,696
Fianna Fáil	Seán Brosnan	9.9	4,542	4,563	4,572	4,837		
Fine Gael	Cornelius Carey	7.9	3,626	3,717	3,734			
Independent	John A. O'Shaughnessy	0.5	227	228				
Electorate: 58,336 Valid: 45,941 Quota: 7,657 Turnout: 78.8%

=== 1961 general election ===
1961 general election: Cork North-East
Party	Candidate	FPv%	Count					
Party	Candidate	FPv%	1	2	3	4	5	6
Fine Gael	Richard Barry	19.0	8,454					
Labour	Patrick McAuliffe	17.0	7,584					
Fianna Fáil	Martin Corry	15.9	7,093	7,151	7,170	7,496		
Fianna Fáil	Batt Donegan	11.9	5,318	5,327	5,359	5,522	5,690	5,836
Fianna Fáil	John Moher	11.9	5,304	5,397	5,414	5,681	5,925	6,089
Fine Gael	Philip Burton	11.6	5,150	5,796	5,854	6,012	8,255	
Fine Gael	Daniel Casey	8.2	3,663	3,860	3,879	4,060		
Sinn Féin	Denis O'Connor	4.4	1,939	1,972	1,993			
Electorate: 58,694 Valid: 44,505 Quota: 7,418 Turnout: 75.8%

== See also ==
- Dáil constituencies
- Politics of the Republic of Ireland
- Historic Dáil constituencies
- Elections in the Republic of Ireland
