= Paddy Donegan =

Irish politician (1923–2000)

Minister for Fisheries
- In office 9 February 1977 – 5 July 1977
- Taoiseach: Liam Cosgrave
- Preceded by: Position restructured
- Succeeded by: Brian Lenihan

Minister for Lands
- In office 2 December 1976 – 9 February 1977
- Taoiseach: Liam Cosgrave
- Preceded by: Tom Fitzpatrick
- Succeeded by: Position restructured

Minister for Defence
- In office 14 March 1973 – 2 December 1976
- Taoiseach: Liam Cosgrave
- Preceded by: Jerry Cronin
- Succeeded by: Liam Cosgrave

Teachta Dála
- In office October 1961 – June 1981
- In office May 1954 – March 1957
- Constituency: Louth

Senator
- In office 22 May 1957 – 4 October 1961
- Constituency: Agricultural Panel

Personal details
- Born: 29 October 1923 Monasterboice, County Louth, Ireland
- Died: 26 November 2000 (aged 77) Drogheda, County Louth, Ireland
- Party: Fine Gael
- Spouse: Olivia Macken (m. 1949)
- Children: 4
- Education: Castleknock College

Patrick Sarsfield Donegan (29 October 1923 – 26 November 2000) was an Irish Fine Gael politician who served as a government minister from 1973 to 1977. He served as a Teachta Dála (TD) from 1954 to 1957 and 1961 to 1981. He also served as a Senator for the Agricultural Panel from 1957 to 1961.

He was born on 29 October 1923 in Monasterboice, County Louth, son of Thomas Francis Donegan, a publican and farmer, and Rose Ann Donegan (née Butterly). He was educated at a Christian Brothers School in Drogheda, County Louth, and at the Vincentian Castleknock College, Dublin.

Donegan was elected as a Fine Gael TD for the Louth constituency at the 1954 general election. He lost his seat at the 1957 general election, but was elected to Seanad Éireann as a Senator for the Agricultural Panel. He regained his Dáil seat at the 1961 general election.

In the Fine Gael–Labour Party coalition government which took office after the 1973 general election Donegan was appointed as Minister for Defence. In October 1976, Donegan made a speech on an official visit to the opening of new kitchen facilities in an army barracks at Mullingar, County Westmeath in which he described as a "thundering disgrace" President Cearbhall Ó Dálaigh's refusal to sign the Emergency Powers Bill 1976. Ó Dálaigh had instead exercised his powers under Article 26 of the Constitution to refer it to the Supreme Court. The Taoiseach, Liam Cosgrave, refused Donegan's resignation. On 21 October, Fianna Fáil proposed a motion in the Dáil calling on the minister to resign, which was defeated. Ó Dálaigh viewed the refusal to remove the minister as an affront to his office by the government and resigned on 22 October 1976.

In December 1976, Donegan was appointed as Minister for Lands. In February 1977, this office was restructured as the Minister for Fisheries. He served in cabinet until the government lost office after the 1977 general election.

Donegan retired from politics at the 1981 general election, and died in 2000. Tributes in the Dáil were led by John Bruton as Fine Gael leader. He was buried in his home town of Monasterboice, County Louth.

Political offices
Preceded by Jerry Cronin	Minister for Defence; 1973–1976	Succeeded by Liam Cosgrave
Preceded by Tom Fitzpatrick	Minister for Lands (Minister for Fisheries from February 1977); 1976–1977	Succeeded by Brian Lenihan

Dáil	Election	Deputy (Party)	Deputy (Party)	Deputy (Party)	Deputy (Party)	Deputy (Party)
4th	1923	Frank Aiken (Rep)	Peter Hughes (CnaG)	James Murphy (CnaG)	3 seats until 1977	
5th	1927 (Jun)	Frank Aiken (FF)	James Coburn (NL)	James Murphy (CnaG)	3 seats until 1977	
6th	1927 (Sep)	Frank Aiken (FF)	James Coburn (NL)	James Murphy (CnaG)	3 seats until 1977	
7th	1932	Frank Aiken (FF)	James Coburn (Ind.)	James Murphy (CnaG)	3 seats until 1977	
8th	1933	Frank Aiken (FF)	James Coburn (Ind.)	James Murphy (CnaG)	3 seats until 1977	
9th	1937	Frank Aiken (FF)	James Coburn (FG)	Laurence Walsh (FF)	3 seats until 1977	
10th	1938	Frank Aiken (FF)	James Coburn (FG)	Laurence Walsh (FF)	3 seats until 1977	
11th	1943	Frank Aiken (FF)	James Coburn (FG)	Roddy Connolly (Lab)	3 seats until 1977	
12th	1944	Frank Aiken (FF)	James Coburn (FG)	Laurence Walsh (FF)	3 seats until 1977	
13th	1948	Frank Aiken (FF)	James Coburn (FG)	Roddy Connolly (Lab)	3 seats until 1977	
14th	1951	Frank Aiken (FF)	James Coburn (FG)	Laurence Walsh (FF)	3 seats until 1977	
14th	1954 by-election	Frank Aiken (FF)	George Coburn (FG)	Laurence Walsh (FF)	3 seats until 1977	
15th	1954	Frank Aiken (FF)	George Coburn (FG)	Paddy Donegan (FG)	3 seats until 1977	
16th	1957	Frank Aiken (FF)	George Coburn (FG)	Pádraig Faulkner (Note: Faulker served as Ceann Comhairle in the 21st Dáil from 1977 to 1981, and was returned automatically at the 1981 election.) (FF)	3 seats until 1977	
17th	1961	Frank Aiken (FF)	Paddy Donegan (FG)	Pádraig Faulkner (FF)	3 seats until 1977	
18th	1965	Frank Aiken (FF)	Paddy Donegan (FG)	Pádraig Faulkner (FF)	3 seats until 1977	
19th	1969	Frank Aiken (FF)	Paddy Donegan (FG)	Pádraig Faulkner (FF)	3 seats until 1977	
20th	1973	Joseph Farrell (FF)	Paddy Donegan (FG)	Pádraig Faulkner (FF)	3 seats until 1977	
21st	1977	Joseph Farrell (FF)	Paddy Donegan (FG)	Pádraig Faulkner (FF)	Eddie Filgate (FF)	4 seats 1977–2011
22nd	1981	Paddy Agnew (AHB)	Bernard Markey (FG)	Pádraig Faulkner (FF)	Eddie Filgate (FF)	4 seats 1977–2011
23rd	1982 (Feb)	Thomas Bellew (FF)	Bernard Markey (FG)	Pádraig Faulkner (FF)	Eddie Filgate (FF)	4 seats 1977–2011
24th	1982 (Nov)	Michael Bell (Lab)	Brendan McGahon (FG)	Pádraig Faulkner (FF)	Séamus Kirk (Note: Kirk served as Ceann Comhairle in the 30th Dáil from 2009 to 2011, and was returned automatically at the 2011 election.) (FF)	4 seats 1977–2011
25th	1987	Michael Bell (Lab)	Brendan McGahon (FG)	Dermot Ahern (FF)	Séamus Kirk (FF)	4 seats 1977–2011
26th	1989	Michael Bell (Lab)	Brendan McGahon (FG)	Dermot Ahern (FF)	Séamus Kirk (FF)	4 seats 1977–2011
27th	1992	Michael Bell (Lab)	Brendan McGahon (FG)	Dermot Ahern (FF)	Séamus Kirk (FF)	4 seats 1977–2011
28th	1997	Michael Bell (Lab)	Brendan McGahon (FG)	Dermot Ahern (FF)	Séamus Kirk (FF)	4 seats 1977–2011
29th	2002	Arthur Morgan (SF)	Fergus O'Dowd (FG)	Dermot Ahern (FF)	Séamus Kirk (FF)	4 seats 1977–2011
30th	2007	Arthur Morgan (SF)	Fergus O'Dowd (FG)	Dermot Ahern (FF)	Séamus Kirk (FF)	4 seats 1977–2011
31st	2011	Gerry Adams (SF)	Fergus O'Dowd (FG)	Ged Nash (Lab)	Séamus Kirk (FF)	Peter Fitzpatrick (FG)
32nd	2016	Gerry Adams (SF)	Fergus O'Dowd (FG)	Declan Breathnach (FF)	Imelda Munster (SF)	Peter Fitzpatrick (FG)
33rd	2020	Ruairí Ó Murchú (SF)	Fergus O'Dowd (FG)	Ged Nash (Lab)	Imelda Munster (SF)	Peter Fitzpatrick (Ind.)
34th	2024	Ruairí Ó Murchú (SF)	Paula Butterly (FG)	Ged Nash (Lab)	Joanna Byrne (SF)	Erin McGreehan (FF)
