= Corruption in the Republic of Ireland =

Corruption in Ireland describes the prevention and occurrence of corruption in the Republic of Ireland.

Transparency International's 2025 Corruption Perceptions Index scored Ireland at 76 on a scale from 0 ("highly corrupt") to 100 ("very clean"). When ranked by score, Ireland ranked 12th among the 182 countries in the Index, where the country ranked first is perceived to have the most honest public sector. For comparison with regional scores, the best score among Western European and European Union countries (Note: Austria, Belgium, Bulgaria, Croatia, Cyprus, Czechia, Denmark, Estonia, Finland, France, Germany, Greece, Hungary, Iceland, Ireland, Italy, Latvia, Lithuania, Luxembourg, Malta, Netherlands, Norway, Poland, Portugal, Romania, Slovakia, Slovenia, Spain, Sweden, Switzerland, and the United Kingdom.) was 89, the average score was 64 and the worst score was 40. For comparison with worldwide scores, the best score was 89 (ranked 1), the average score was 42, and the worst score was 9 (ranked 181, in a two-way tie).

During the years before the Celtic Tiger (1995–2007), political corruption was at its worst with many politicians suspected of corruption, while financial corruption was at its peak during the Celtic Tiger years. In 2003 Ireland signed the United Nations Convention against Corruption treaty and ratified it on 11 November 2011.

== Politics ==
=== Pre-partition ===
The Acts of Union (1800), which saw the Kingdom of Ireland become part of the United Kingdom of Great Britain and Ireland, was marked by bribery on a scale not seen before in Ireland. The Members of the Parliament of Ireland were induced by favours of titles and land to vote it out of existence.

Local politics in 19th-century Ireland came to be dominated by either Irish nationalist or unionist local councils. Both were known for their corruption, which surpassed that in Britain.

=== 1900–1940 ===
The Irish Free State was established as, in all but name, an independent state in 1922. In the 1920s, politicians were even expected to reimburse the cost of meals, and some slept in their offices due to gunfire outside.

One major case of corruption in Ireland happened in County Wicklow; dubbed the Wicklow Gold Inquiry, it involved the distribution of mining licenses in 1935. The Minister for Industry and Commerce at the time, Seán Lemass, granted a mining licence to the politicians Michael Comyn and Bob Briscoe. These licenses covered an area of 2,982 acres in Wicklow. They both leased the land to a British mining company in exchange for £12,000 and royalties on any gold found. An inquiry was launched due to Patrick McGilligan of Cumann na nGaedheal accusing Lemass of favouring members of the Fianna Fáil political party. The inquiry cleared Lemass of any wrongdoing due to the fact that he did not benefit financially.

=== 1940–1960 ===
Another tribunal was set up in 1943 after allegations that advance information was made available selectively when the Great Southern Railway and the Dublin United Transport Company were merged and nationalized to form Córas Iompair Éireann, allowing shareholders to make massive profits. It was revealed in the tribunal that several people were tipped off of this plan before it went public, in what is now known as insider trading. The organisations and people who were aware of the upcoming merger included the Bank of Ireland, the Representative Body of the Church of Ireland and the Archbishop of Dublin, John Charles McQuaid. The tribunal found that they all made financial gain from this activity, yet no action was taken against any of the lawbreakers.

The next major political scandal happened in 1946 when Dr. Francis Ward, a prominent politician from Monaghan and holder of a pig-producing licence from Seán Lemass's department, had the following allegations put forward against him by a constituency rival, Dr Patrick McCarvill;

- sacking Dr Patrick McCarvill's son from his meat factory and replacing him with his own son,
- embezzling £12,000 from his company's account,
- he was still being paid as a local doctor even though he had been replaced,
- that Ward had used public money to erect a Fianna Fáil hall on his own land.

When an inquiry was established it found all the allegations against him false, but found him guilty of tax evasion. When this was made public, Ward resigned and became the first politician in the state to resign over personal mistakes.

The last major corruption case in the 1940s occurred in 1947 when a tribunal was called to look into the sale of Locke's Distillery in Kilbeggan, County Westmeath. This sale attracted a lot of attention at the time due to a worldwide shortage of Whiskey, and with its extensive stocks, several foreign syndicates were interested. A politician from Laois, Oliver J. Flanagan, accused the Taoiseach at the time Éamon de Valera, Seán Lemass and Justice Minister Gerald Boland of political favouritism and abuse of power in relation to the sale. The tribunal sat for 18 days, most of it deciphering the mountains of allegations Flanagan made. When the allegations were dropped, it became an inquiry into the credibility of Flanagan where it concluded that Flanagan had deliberately lied in his evidence to the inquiry.

=== 1960–1980 ===
Before the 1960s it was relatively easy to get planning permission, but that changed in the year 1963 when the highly restrictive Planning Act was passed. This placed exceptional powers in the hands of newly appointed officials. Since this act was introduced it has been blamed as the principal factor of the upswing of Irish political corruption in the years after. This was proved in the following few years when Charlie Haughey, the Minister for Finance and Liam Lawlor, a TD from the Lucan area, both received planning permission for huge housing estates on land in which they owned.

The Kenny Report of 1974 attempted to bring an effective end to land speculation by nationalizing all building land, putting a capital gains tax on any profit made from the disposal of land and placing a high stamp duty rate on the transfer of any land suitable for building but Fianna Fáil, the government at the time, refused to accept any of these, or the 9 other, recommendations that were made in the report, as it was against their best interests.

Another corruption tribunal was brought to court in 1975, this one involving a Labour TD from Co. Meath, James Tully. Mr. Tully, who was the minister for local government at the time, was the subject of much suspicion regarding several planning decisions made in his name. These decisions were given the name “Tully permissions” and went completely against the rules regarding proper planning. The year before, Tully was also accused of “Tullymandering”, a take-off of gerrymandering, which involves rearranging electoral boundaries to benefit a particular political party. This tribunal was brought into being to investigate these matters and also his apparent improper relationship with a certain building contractor, Bobby Farrelly, and when the trial was over, he was cleared of any wrongdoing.

=== 1980–2000 ===
Mrs. Avril Doyle

"This report is about much more than an investigation into the beef industry, it is about how Fianna Fáil exercises power in Government, and how in Government it blatantly disregards the primacy of this House.... In the words of Dick Walsh, Fianna Fáil does not know the difference between running a democracy and owning one.”

— Dáil Éireann

In 1991 a Tribunal of Inquiry into the Beef Industry was established to investigate tax evasion, malpractice and regulatory weaknesses in Ireland's beef industry. Part of the tribunal also involved looking into the 'unhealthy' relationship between Taoiseach Charlie Haughey and leading beef magnate, Larry Goodman. The government were accused, by Labour TD Pat Rabbitte, of providing export insurance to him in respect of his sale of beef in Iraq and in effect, giving him favourable treatment. When the results of the tribunal were published it uncovered many serious malpractices in the industry. The report also cleared the taoiseach of any wrongdoing and stated; “There is no evidence to suggest that either the Taoiseach at the time or the Minister for Industry and Commerce at the time was personally close to Mr. Goodman or that Mr. Goodman had any political associations with either of them or the party that they represented.”

The McCracken Tribunal of 1997 investigated reports of secret payments by Ben Dunne to former Taoiseach, Charles Haughey and former cabinet minister Michael Lowry. This tribunal found that Haughey had given untrue evidence under oath and that Lowry was knowingly assisted by Dunne in evading tax. When this was made public, the tribunal attempted to initiate criminal proceedings against both men, but failed when it was judged that Haughey would not get a fair trial due to prejudicial comments by Tánaiste Mary Harney.

The Moriarty Tribunal of 1997 was a follow-up from the McCracken Tribunal which was an inquiry into the financial affairs of politicians Charles Haughey and Michael Lowry. The tribunal lasted 14 years and was finally concluded in March 2011, five years after Charles Haughey had died. In the findings it was reported that;

- Mr. Haughey stole a "sizeable proportion" from the Brian Lenihan medical fund and took steps to conceal his actions.
- Charles Haughey accepted cash in return for favours throughout his political career.
- Confirmation of facts regarding payments by Dunne to Haughey and Lowry.

After these were reported, the tribunal stated the sums paid to the former Taoiseach were worth €45m in today's money. In return for these secret payments, the tribunal declared Mr Haughey did a number of favours for wealthy businessmen.

The last major tribunal before the new millennium was the Mahon Tribunal. This inquiry was to investigate allegations of corrupt payments to politicians regarding political decisions. The tribunal ran from November 1997 to March 2012 and was the longest-running and most expensive public inquiry ever held in the Republic of Ireland. It mostly investigated planning permissions and land rezoning issues in the 1990s in the Dublin County Council area. Despite its steep costs, the tribunal has also yielded some benefits, with about €50 million collected by the Revenue Commissioners and the Criminal Assets Bureau in light of the information it has garnered. As a result of the tribunal George Redmond, who devised a system that if a new planning application was made without his assistance, the service charges and levies would be fixed at least 100% more than with his help, and Ray Burke, who opened and maintained offshore bank accounts in the Isle of Man for the purpose of receiving and concealing corrupt payments, have served prison sentences for tax evasion and Liam Lawlor has served three prison sentences for non-co-operation with the inquiry.

=== 2000– ===
In June 2012, the first-ever corruption and bribery law reforms were brought for approval to the Minister for Justice and Equality, Alan Shatter. Some of the proposed laws include; Prison terms of up to 10 years and unlimited fines on any member of government, or civil servant, who commits an act of corruption.

==== Bertie Ahern ====
Mr. Bertie Ahern

"What I got personally in my life, to be frank with you is none of your business. If I got something from somebody as a present or something like that I can use it."

— Interview

Bertie Ahern was criticised by the Moriarty Tribunal for signing blank cheques for the Taoiseach Charles Haughey, without asking what those cheques were for. In September 2006, The Irish Times printed claims allegedly leaked from the Mahon Tribunal that Ahern had received money from a millionaire businessman while Minister for Finance in 1993, his response to these allegations is quoted to the right.

On 3 October 2006 Ahern made a 15-minute statement in Dáil Éireann defending his actions in taking loans totalling IR£39,000 (€50,000) from friends in Ireland and £8,000 (€11,800) as a gift from businessmen in Manchester in 1993 and 1994.

When further questions were raised about IR£50,000 (€63,300) he had lodged to his bank account in 1994, Mr. Ahern claimed this was money he had saved over a substantial period of time when he had had no active bank account. During this period he was Minister for Labour and subsequently Minister for Finance. He was asked by Pat Rabbitte whether, in the absence of a bank account, he had kept the money in a 'sock in the hot-press' and by Joe Higgins if he had kept the money 'in a shoe-box'. Ahern replied that he had kept the money 'in his own possession'. In May 2007, it emerged that Ahern's then partner, Celia Larkin, received £30,000 from the businessman Micheál Wall to contribute towards the refurbishment of the house that Ahern was to buy later. When he appeared at the Mahon Tribunal in 2007, the Tribunal chairman Judge Alan Mahon said there were "significant gaps in the money trail provided by Mr Ahern which "would have made it impossible for the tribunal to follow the trail"

== Business corruption ==
According to the World Economic Forum's Global Competitiveness Report 2013–2014, surveyed business executives do not consider corruption a problem for doing business in Ireland while factors such as access to financing, inefficient government bureaucracy and restrictive labour regulations are ranked as the most problematic factors. According to the Eurobarometer 2012, Irish respondents’ perception of corruption in the business culture exceeds others in the EU, with 86% considering corruption to be part of the Irish business culture, compared to the EU average of 67%. Companies should note that the new Criminal Justice (Corruption) Bill 2012 is awaiting enactment in Parliament, which will not consolidate anti-corruption legislation and introduce new provisions that will create criminal liability for companies for any corrupt practice by its employees and agents, and it will require companies to “take all responsible steps” and “exercise all due diligence” to avoid legal liability for corrupt behaviour of employees, directors, subsidiaries and agents anywhere in the world - in line with the “adequate procedure” requirement of the UK Bribery Act 2010.

== Financial corruption ==
=== Miler Magrath ===
Miler Magrath was a Franciscan Priest, and Anglican Archbishop of Cashel in the 16th century. He was portrayed as a figure of hatred for both Protestant and Catholic historians, owing to his ambiguous and corrupt activities during the Reformation where "dissolved churches and lands became battlegrounds for profit and cultural hegemony". On the Protestant side, he was blamed for financial corruption and on the Catholic side as a collaborator in the destruction of the church (and appropriation of church lands) by the new ruling class. He made a fortune by holding several Dioceses and up to 70 parishes, barely looking after each of them. However ironically for Protestant colonists such as Edmund Spenser "the destruction of monk and lord - especially when portrayed as partial self-destruction - provided an attractive scenario for the eager newcomer who could express shock at their sins and yet happily inherit their land" as Spenser and other New English did in most cases.

=== William Robinson ===
William Robinson was an architect and Surveyor General of Ireland who designed many notable buildings in Ireland in the 1600s, some of which include the Royal Hospital Kilmainham, St. Mary's Church, Dublin and developmental works on Dublin Castle. Robinson was knighted and admitted to the Privy Council of Ireland, but during his time in Ireland, he received so many official titles and amassed such a fortune that suspicions of corruption were rife, and served time in jail for it in 1710. This case is notable for being one of the first official cases of corruption in the colonial administration of Ireland.

=== Denis O’Brien ===
In 1995, Denis O'Brien was head of one of six corporations looking for a lucrative second Irish mobile phone operator's licence. When he was chosen to receive the license, there was major controversy as he was suspected of bribing Fine Gael government TD and Minister for Communications Michael Lowry. The license procurement, which ultimately made O'Brien one of the richest men in Ireland, was proven to be corrupt in an investigation by the Moriarty Tribunal, where it was proven that;

- O'Brien gave substantial sums of money to Fine Gael in order to make friends with people in the party.
- Denis O’Brien, or persons close to him, subsequently sought to give large amounts of money to Michael Lowry.
- Michael Lowry, in return, sought to be involved to a greater degree in the licensing process, seeking information about it on a number of occasions and influencing the decision and selection process in Esat's favour.

=== Seán FitzPatrick ===
Seán FitzPatrick was head of Anglo Irish Bank from 1986 until 2008, when he resigned after it emerged he had taken secret loans worth €155 million from the bank, hiding them from auditors for eight years. He later defaulted on these loans due to the Great Recession and was unable to repay his debts, although he retired from his position with a pension of €4 million a year.

=== Michael Fingleton ===
Michael Fingleton was chief executive of the Irish Nationwide Building Society up until 2009, when he resigned due to the effects of the Irish banking crisis. Fingleton was responsible for arranging loans for politicians and other public figures, with some loans totalling over €10 million. Among those who received loans from Fingleton include; Charlie McCreevy, Don Lydon, Francis O'Brien and Celia Larkin who received a loan without requiring any proof of income.

=== Willie McAteer ===
Willie McAteer was chief executive and chief risk officer of Anglo Irish Bank up until January 2009 when he resigned. McAteer was arrested in 2012 in relation to a failed attempt to boost Anglo's share price after a stock market collapse. He was responsible for giving unlawful financial assistance to a select group of businessmen to purchase shares after the bank's value plummeted in 2008. At the time of the alleged incident, McAteer had the second-largest number of shares in the bank, totalling 3.5 million.

== Tax evaders (politicians) ==
=== Charlie Haughey ===
Of the €45million Charlie Haughey was said to have amassed due to corrupt dealings, he made a deal with Revenue where he only paid €6.5 million in back taxes and penalties in relation to what he called 'undeclared political donations'. Haughey was not convicted for evading tax on his vast private income but was charged with obstructing the McCracken tribunal.

=== Mick Wallace ===
Mick Wallace, an independent politician from Wexford, was revealed in 2012 to have had knowingly made false declarations to the authorities regarding payment of VAT. In total his undeclared VAT liabilities totalled €2,133,708, but he stated that he believes that none of the money will ever be paid in full to Revenue because his company is insolvent and he is not personally liable. Mr. Wallace's company went into receivership in November 2011 when his company was said to have owed over €19million to ACC Bank.

=== George Redmond ===
George Redmond, the former assistant city and county manager in Dublin, was revealed in 1999 to owe £500,000 to the Revenue Commission for unpaid taxes. In total it was claimed he had over 20 different bank accounts to hide corrupt payments. When interest and penalties are added in, he was said to have owed in excess of £2 million.

=== Denis Foley ===
In 2000 Denis Foley, a Fianna Fáil politician from Kerry North, was accused of having an offshore account to evade tax. He eventually was forced to pay €580,000 to the Revenue Commission to cover his undeclared income.

=== Ray Burke ===
In 2005 Ray Burke became one of the most senior politicians to be jailed on criminal charges, after he was convicted of tax offences. It was revealed in the Mahon Tribunal that Mr. Burke had received over £200,000 corrupt payments and made incorrect tax returns on these. He received a 6-month sentence but only served 4½.

=== Michael Collins ===
Michael Collins, a politician from Limerick, hit the headlines in 2003 when it was revealed that he had set up a bogus offshore account to evade paying tax. He settled the bill with the Revenue Commissioners, paying over €130,000 in taxes, interest and penalties. He was charged with cheating the Collector General and obtaining a tax clearance certificate with fake pretences by falsely claiming to be tax compliant.

== See also ==
- RTÉ secret payment scandal
- Irish political scandals
