= Office of Public Works =

Irish Government agency

Office of Public Works (formally the Commissioners of Public Works in Ireland)

Agency overview
- Formed: 15 October 1831; 195 years ago
- Preceding agency: Barrack Board and Board of Works / Civil Buildings Commissioners (subsumed the Office of the Surveyor General), Directors-General of Inland Navigation (subsumed the Fisheries Commissioners), Postmaster General (partly), Public Works Loans Commissioners
- Type: State agency
- Jurisdiction: Republic of Ireland
- Headquarters: Jonathan Swift Street, Trim, County Meath
- Employees: c. 2400 (~1950 full-time, ~450 seasonal / part-time)
- Annual budget: €424 million + €90 million (2018, last reported)
- Ministers responsible: Jack Chambers, Minister for Public Expenditure, Infrastructure, Public Service Reform and Digitalisation; Patrick O'Donovan, Minister of State at the Department of Public Expenditure, Infrastructure, Public Service Reform and Digitalisation
- Agency executive: John Conlon, Chairman
- Parent department: Department of Public Expenditure, Infrastructure, Public Service Reform and Digitalisation
- Child agency: Heritage Ireland, Government Publications Office
- Key document: Extension and Promotion of Public Works in Ireland Act 1831
- Website: www.opw.ie

The Office of Public Works (OPW) (Irish: Oifig na nOibreacha Poiblí; legally the Commissioners of Public Works in Ireland) is a major Irish Government agency, which manages most of the Irish State's property portfolio, including hundreds of owned and rented Government offices and police properties, oversees National Monuments and directly manages some heritage properties, and is the lead State engineering agency, with a special focus on flood risk management. It lies within the remit of the Minister for Public Expenditure, Infrastructure, Public Service Reform and Digitalisation, with functions largely delegated to a Minister of State at the Department of Public Expenditure, Infrastructure, Public Service Reform and Digitalisation with special responsibility for the Office. The OPW has a central role in driving the Government's property asset management reform process, both in respect of its own portfolio and that of the wider public service. The agency was initially known as the Board of Works, a title inherited from a preceding body, and this term is still sometimes encountered.

The second oldest state agency in all of Ireland, the OPW subsumed the functions of the Commissioners and Overseers of Barracks (the Barrack Board) and the Board of Works / Civil Buildings Commissioners (which two agencies had in turn taken on the functions of the Office of the Surveyor General in 1762), the Directors-General of Inland Navigation (which had taken on the functions of the Fisheries Commissioners), and some functions of the Postmaster-General, and those of the Public Works Loans Commissioners.

In the 21st century, the OPW includes the Government Publications Office, and publishes the State gazette, Iris Oifigiúil, and also manages some aspects of the household of the President of Ireland. It for many years oversaw aspects of public procurement, including the first centralised national procurement office. Its fisheries functions later moved to more specialised departments, the inland navigation functions were largely transferred to Waterways Ireland in 1999, and many purchasing functions moved to the Office of Government Procurement in 2014.

== Name ==
The body is formally The Commissioners of Public Works in Ireland, though the full title is rarely used, other than in legislation, with Office of Public Works the main working title, even in parliamentary documents and accounts, and Board of Works is also used. Legally the Office's powers are vested in its three commissioners, though operationally it has a broader management team.

== History ==
=== Preceding bodies ===
Until the late 17th century, public buildings in Ireland were financed, constructed and maintained by royal officials, most notably the Surveyor General of Ireland, without any involvement of parliamentary authorities, but in 1700, the Irish Parliament created two bodies, a set of land trustees (the Trustees of Barracks), and the Commissioners and Overseers of Barracks (informally known as the Barrack Board) to handle military accommodation, using funds allocated by parliamentary vote. In 1759, the role of the Barrack Board was extended to include fortresses and other public buildings, and its name became the Barrack Board and Board of Works. The body of seven salaried commissioners were made responsible for forts, palaces and other public buildings, including Dublin Castle, specifically covering their furnishing and maintenance. The Surveyor General of the time, who was also, as had been the convention for at least decades, the Engineer General of the Board of Ordnance, raised some concerns about the potential interference of the new commissioners with his role, and in 1761, responsibility for fortifications was moved from the Barrack Board and Board of Works to the Board of Ordnance. However, in 1762, it was decided to abolish the office of Surveyor General, and this was completed by 1763, with most of its work transferred to the Barrack Board and Board of Works, and the remainder was continued by the staff of the Board of Ordnance, within which a reduced version of the role was created.

=== Establishment ===
Public Works (Ireland) Act 1831 (Note: The citation of this act by this short title was authorised by section 1 of, and the first schedule to, the Short Titles Act 1896. Due to the repeal of those provisions it is now authorised by section 19(2) of the Interpretation Act 1978.)
- Act of Parliament
- Parliament of the United Kingdom
- Long title: An Act for the Extension and Promotion of Public Works in Ireland.
- Citation: 1 & 2 Will. 4. c. 33
- Territorial extent: United Kingdom

Dates
- Royal assent: 15 October 1831
- Commencement: 15 October 1831 (Note: The Acts of Parliament (Commencement) Act 1793.)
- Repealed: 18 December 1953
Other legislation
Repealed by	Glebe Loan (Ireland) Act 1870; Statute Law Revision Act 1874; Statute Law Revision Act 1890; Statute Law Revision Act 1953

Status: Repealed

Text of statute as originally enacted

The office was created on 15 October 1831 by the Public Works (Ireland) Act 1831 (1 & 2 Will. 4. c. 33), which provided for a body of three commissioners, with powers to employ staff, pay for works, and make loans to other bodies, accountable quarterly to the Treasury in London. The Westminster Parliament took this step partly to better manage a sum of £500,000 which had been made available to deal with poverty caused by the 1831 famine in Ireland, and partly to reduce the cost and complexity arising from the proliferation of public bodies in the area of public works in Ireland. It was formed to assume the functions of the Commissioners for Public Buildings / Board of Works, the Commissioners and Overseers of Barracks (commonly known as the Barrack(s) Board), and the Directors-General of Inland Navigation (which had taken on the work of the former Fisheries Commissioners). The office also took on functions from other bodies, most specifically concerned with Ireland, including the Postmaster General and the Public Works Loan Commissioners, which continued to operate for several decades alongside the OPW, but also including the Commissioners of Woods and Forests (a United Kingdom-wide authority). The commissioners were given the power to pay salaries but not to promise or pay pensions. The body was, and sometimes still is, informally known as the Board of Works, from the name of one of the predecessor authorities.

=== Development in the 19th century ===
==== Loans ====
The Commissioners of Public Works were given responsibility for administration and recovery of funds provided for public relief works under Public Works Loans Act 1817 (57 Geo. 3. c. 34), and given powers to extend further loans for construction or improvement of works, so long as there was some income from which to repay these loans, and to a cap of half a million pounds outstanding at any one time. Power to make outright grants, of up to 50,000 pounds, was also given. By 1845, the OPW had already disbursed more than a million pounds in loans and grants.

==== Harbours, fisheries and roads ====
Already from 1831, the OPW was made responsible for the completion of the part-built Kingstown Harbour (the town having been recently renamed), and Dunmore Harbour. Howth Harbour, as completed in the early 1820s, and the road from the village to Dublin city, were transferred from the Commissioners for Woods and Forests in 1836, and other royal harbours, at Ardglass and Donaghadee, were transferred to OPW control in 1838. The Commissioners of Public Works were initially assigned responsibility to collect repayment on loans advanced by the former Irish Fisheries Commissioners, as well as completing any fisheries pier construction projects already underway. A temporary commission sitting from 1834 made recommendations which resulted in a new act of Parliament, the Fisheries (Ireland) Act 1842 (5 & 6 Vict. c. 106), which expanded the OPW's remit around fisheries considerably, and was followed by further related acts over the following five years, which also added a role in the promotion of deep-sea fishing.

The Office of the Postmaster General had responsibility for several hundred miles of road built from the 1820s on by county Grand Juries, mostly in more remote parts of Ireland, while the Directors of Inland Navigation had also grant-funded the development of hundreds of miles of roads, and all of these were transferred to the Commissioners of Public Works.

==== Inland navigation ====
Inland navigation responsibilities transferred from the Directors General of Inland Navigation were initially focused on the upper River Shannon, including two of its major lakes and estuarine tributary the Maigue, and the River Boyne and the Tyrone Navigation. In 1839, the Shannon Commission, a body of three officials, was created to take responsibility for the whole Shannon Navigation system, but this body was dissolved already in 1846, and its functions transferred to the Office of Public Works, which was assigned two additional commissioners to take account of the increased workload. The navigation work employed considerable numbers of people during the Great Famine, and over half a million pounds was spent on channel deepening, and the building of piers, embankments and bridges by 1850. Later works included the construction of the Ballinamore and Ballyconnell Canal, and further major developments on the Shannon system from 1880 to 1884, as well as a separate project on the River Suck system.

==== Drainage and flood risk management ====
Drainage (Ireland) Act 1842
- Act of Parliament
- Parliament of the United Kingdom
- Long title: An Act to promote the Drainage of Lands, and Improvement of Navigation and Water Power in connexion with such Drainage, in Ireland.
- Citation: 5 & 6 Vict. c. 89
- Territorial extent: Ireland (Note: Long title.)

Dates
- Royal assent: 5 August 1842
- Commencement: 5 August 1842 (Note: The Acts of Parliament (Commencement) Act 1793.)
- Repealed: 2 March 1954
Other legislation
Amended by	Drainage (Ireland) Act 1846; Statute Law Revision Act 1861
Repealed by	Erne Drainage and Development Act (Northern Ireland) 1950; Inland Navigation Act (Northern Ireland) 1954

Status: Repealed

Text of statute as originally enacted

Drainage (Ireland) Act 1846
- Act of Parliament
- Parliament of the United Kingdom
- Long title: An Act to amend the Acts for promoting the Drainage of Lands, and Improvement of Navigation and Water Power in connexion with such Drainage, in Ireland; and to afford Facilities for increased Employment for the labouring Classes in Works of Drainage during the present Year.
- Citation: 9 & 10 Vict. c. 4
- Territorial extent: United Kingdom

Dates
- Royal assent: 5 March 1846
- Commencement: 1 January 1847 (Note: Section 1.)
- Repealed: 28 June 1950 (Note: The Lough and River Erne Drainage and Navigation Board (Dissolution) Order 1950 (SR&O 1950/112).)
Other legislation
Amends	Drainage (Ireland) Act 1842; Drainage (Ireland) Act 1845
Repealed by	Drainage and Improvement of Lands (Ireland) Act 1853; Statute Law Revision Act 1875; Statute Law Revision Act 1891; Erne Drainage and Development Act (Northern Ireland) 1950

Status: Repealed

Text of statute as originally enacted

The Office's involvement with drainage began in its early years, and extended with the Drainage (Ireland) Act 1842 (5 & 6 Vict. c. 89), after which large-scale drainage schemes followed, and extended further after the passage of the Drainage (Ireland) Act 1846 (9 & 10 Vict. c. 4), which enabled the OPW to fully fund works.

The Arterial Drainage Act 1945, codified the work of the OPW in this area, and required the elaboration of a national drainage plan. From 1948 to 1992 works were carried out on more than 30 rivers, protecting 647,050 acres of land.

==== The Famine years ====
The commissioners were asked to provide work to help mitigate the effects of the Great Famine, with four acts passed at Westminster in 1846 for what were called "relief works", respectively for general public works, county works, building of piers, harbours and fisheries facilities, and drainage projects. These were followed by additional acts to support the issuing of loans to finance further employment, but there were issues with quality control, coordination across districts, and management of the large workforces involved.

==== Civic buildings ====
From the Commissioners of Civic Buildings, management of Dublin Castle, the Phoenix Park, and official residences and court buildings was moved to the OPW from its inception, followed by district-level mental asylums in 1834. In 1836, the Treasury Building at Dublin Castle was converted as a base for the newly formed Irish Constabulary (which later became the Royal Irish Constabulary (RIC)) and placed in OPW care, and in 1842 the Royal Hospital Kilmainham, and the new Smithfield Prison, were also taken in hand, followed in 1845 by the Queen's Colleges at Cork, Galway and Belfast – which later became University College Cork, University College Galway and Queen's University Belfast – and Maynooth College. Management of coast guard and customs facilities was also assumed in 1845, and by 1857 properties concerned with the Revenue Commissioners, the Post Office and the National Education Board were also under OPW management.

The OPW had responsibility for the building of primary school teacher housing and national school buildings from 1856, and for local dispensaries, and provision of financial help towards housing for the working classes, both urban and farm labouring. Major works were performed concerning other public buildings, including the erection of the National Museum and National Library, with a budget of 100,000 pounds.

==== Railways and trams ====
The OPW was responsible from 1842 for interactions between railways and inland waterways, with the aim to ensure there was no interference with inland navigation passage, or drainage. The OPW was additionally given powers under legislation concerning tram and light rail systems, from 1860, 1861 and 1889, and could advance loans towards construction and maintenance costs. Later in the 19th century, the OPW was further given the power to fund railway construction in congested districts in the western side of Ireland, and it was involved with at least one such project, in County Donegal.

==== National monuments ====
The OPW assumed powers over some heritage properties from 1869, with transfers of historic buildings formerly vested in the Church of Ireland taking place over following years. These included the remains of major monastic settlements, such as Glendalough, the Rock of Cashel, Clonmacnoise and Monasterboice, as well as later monasteries, abbeys and friaries, some cathedrals, round towers, high crosses and monks' cells; also transferred were some ogham stones. Eighteen additional properties were assigned to the care of the OPW in 1882, under the Ancient Monuments Protection Act 1882, including stone forts such as the complex of megalithic monuments including Newgrange, Knowth and Dowth, now known as Brú na Bóinne, the Grianan of Aileach and Staigue Fort, the stone circles at Moytura, Cong, County Mayo, the Hill of Tara, Navan Fort, Slieve na Calliagh, and, in County Sligo, Queen Meave's Tomb and the Knocknarea passage tomb.

In 1892 the OPW was given general powers concerning any "ancient or medieval structure of historic or architectural interest", with further powers granted in 1903 and 1923. Some powers required the consent of land owners, and this was sometimes refused, as by the Lord Dunsany in 1893, concerning Trim Castle. By 1983 over 400 monuments were registered with the Commission of Public Works and another 417 were subject to preservation orders.

==== The 20th century ====
Up until the early 1920s, the OPW was, as all parts of the Irish Executive, the branch of the British Government in Ireland, an all-Ireland body. After the independence of most of Ireland in December 1922, the OPW ceased to be an all Ireland body and its reporting line moved from the Treasury to the Department of Finance in the new Irish Free State, where it remained for decades (before moving to the Department of Public Expenditure and Reform in 2011).

From the 1980s, the OPW led work on Dublin Castle, the former Royal College of Science on Merrion Street turned Government Buildings, and the Royal Hospital, Kilmainham. The original Ballinamore and Ballyconnell Canal having failed, and been transferred to the relevant local authorities, the canal and associated waters were transferred back to the modern OPW and reworked as the Shannon–Erne Waterway between 1990 and 1994, when it reopened on time and within budget.

Between 1998 and 2000, the OPW managed the development of a new office complex for Leinster House, with offices for more than 100 members and staff of the Oireachtas and new committee and party leader rooms. 2000 also saw the delivery of a new visitor and educational building for the National Botanic Gardens, the completion of work on Rathfarnham Castle, two projects at the Irish Museum of Modern Art, and the beginning of work to make Farmleigh usable as the State's premium accommodation for visiting dignitaries. The OPW also delivered projects outside Ireland, at the United Nations Plaza in New York, and for Expo 2000. From 2000, the OPW assumed responsibility for acquisition of sites for both primary and post-primary schools.

=== Heritage sites ===
The OPW had general responsibility for the majority of heritage sites within the Republic of Ireland prior to 1996. In 1996 the management of most of these sites was transferred to a new agency, Dúchas, branded as Dúchas: The Heritage Service, within another department of government. Dúchas, which also included the National Parks and Wildlife Service (NPWS), adopted a stylised version of the traditional OPW logo, with the OPW changing its logo to match its new focus on its buildings and maintenance functions. In 2003 Dúchas was wound up and some of its functions are now operated by a standalone National Parks and Wildlife Service, and some by the National Monuments Service (NMS) at the Department of Housing, Local Government and Heritage, while functions not transferred to the NPWS or the NMS reverted to being OPW responsibilities, which mainly relate to built heritage sites; these functions are operated under the brand Heritage Ireland.

=== The 21st century ===
The OPW continued an annual programme of property acquisition by purchase and lease, and disposal, including civil service, police, prison and educational facilities, as well as managing a range of strategic projects. In 2001, the Office funded a major study of the River Tolka for three local authorities, and managed projects on the Irish Colleges in Paris and Rome, and the Island of Ireland Peace Park in Mesen, Belgium, and in 2002, projects included civic offices, laboratories, the completion of a new wing at the National Gallery of Ireland, the erection of new exhibitions at the National Museum of Ireland, Collins Barracks, and the launch of an online version of the State gazette. In 2003, the OPW was assigned the task of locating and contracting, fitting-out or adapting offices for 10,000 civil servants scheduled to move out from Dublin to various other urban areas in a mass decentralisation programme, in addition to which it completed a new Garda Siochana command centre at Harcourt Square, and a passport production facility in Balbriggan. In 2004–2005, projects included the construction of new staff offices, a restaurant and entrance facilities at Dublin Zoo, and the completion of a multi-year restoration of the Victorian Palm House at the Botanic Gardens and of the glass houses on Garinish Island, as well as supporting both the development of the Aviva Stadium and of the new National Sports Campus at Abbotstown, County Dublin.

In 2006, it was announced that the OPW's own headquarters would be decentralised to Trim, County Meath, and an internal competition was held for the design of a new headquarters building. The Trim Headquarters officially opened in late 2008 with staff moving in in the following months. A small number of staff remained in 52 St Stephen's Green which was part of the former Dublin Headquarters (51 St Stephen's Green). The Backwestern Laboratory project, which cost over 200 million euro was completed, and the sale by the OPW of state property in Ballsbridge yielded over 170 million euro. In 2010, the head office of the OPW move to Trim, while the National Convention Centre in Dublin opened, under a public-private partnership, and a major wave of flood risk management studies got underway, including reviews of Cork's River Lee, and Dublin's River Dodder. In 2011, the OPW noted that visitor numbers to its managed properties exceeded 3.5 million, and it managed aspects of the State visits of both Queen Elizabeth II and President Barack Obama. In 2012, the Office set up a central IT system for its libraries, and a construction management system for National Monuments sites. Major works were also completed at Clonmacnoise and the Hill of Tara, and 230 bridges were repaired or replaced. The National Procurement Service continued to operate within the OPW, and the Government appointed its first Chief Procurement Officer.

In 2014, visitor numbers to major OPW-managed heritage sites passed 4 million, while the Irish presidency of the EU was hosted at a much lower cost than a decade earlier due to use of OPW-managed office premises and Dublin Castle. The National Procurement Service was moved from the OPW to an independent establishment under the same government department.

In 2021, the 300 remaining Dublin staff vacated 52 St Stephen's Green and moved to 1GQ on George's Quay, Dublin 2, bringing to an end to their decades long presence on the iconic Dublin Georgian square.

In September 2024, the agency was involved in a "huge political controversy" when it was revealed that a bike shed at Leinster House, the construction of which the OPW had managed, cost €336,051. Speaking in September 2024, John Conlon, chairman of the OPW, noted that the bike shed project had been outsourced to south Dublin contractor Sensori Facilities Management, who had in turn outsourced it themselves. The Irish Examiner noted that Conlon "took responsibility for the controversial spend" ahead of a meeting before the Oireachtas Finance Committee, and acknowledged that the OPW "could have done better."

== Functions ==
The OPW operates as a service provider and facilitator of expertise to government departments, offices and other agencies in the areas of:

- Property management and maintenance – services include architecture, valuation, quantity surveying and project management, engineering, as well as ongoing facilities management, and estate portfolio management
- Heritage property oversight, and management for selected major heritage properties - including the conservation, preservation and presentation of heritage and cultural properties, and the running of the annual lottery for attendance at Newgrange for the winter solstice
- Flood risk management – the OPW is the lead agency for flood risk management in Ireland, responsible for developing and implementing comprehensive policies and strategies for flood risk management. It leads and co-ordinates a whole of government approach to flood risk management across three strategic and policy areas of prevention, protection and preparedness.

The OPW also:

- manages the State Art Collection, comprising more than 16,000 works, with around 90% on public display in State offices and heritage properties,
- operates the Government Publications Office, including managing a sales facility to the public for government publications - this part of the Office also produces Iris Oifigiúil, the Irish government's gazette.

Central functions of the Office include multiple libraries.

=== Property management and maintenance ===
The OPW is the main provider of services to departments and agencies of the Irish government related to property procurement, construction and fit-out, and management. Specific services related to construction and fit-out include design and architecture, valuation and quantity surveying, project management, and engineering. For ongoing holdings, the OPW can deliver facilities management, and it also manages the overall State estate portfolio. As part of this work, it manages aspects of the Presidential household.

=== Flood risk management ===
The OPW's early work in flood risk management was centred on arterial drainage, working from minor and major rivers, and accounting for 11,500 km of channels. This work continues in the 21st century, with channels maintained in 1- to 20-year cycles, most commonly at 4- to 6-year intervals.

As of 2019, the OPW oversaw 434 watercourse monitoring stations, with more than half a million visits to the Office's water level data website. 580 projects had been completed under a scheme for minor flood works, and coastal protection, and 45 flood relief schemes for a total investment of around US$400 million.

=== Former functions ===
The OPW oversaw aspects of public procurement, including the first centralised national procurement office, with most of these moved to the Office of Government Procurement in 2014. It had a number of fisheries-related functions, later moved to more specialised departments, while its inland navigation functions, concerning major canals and the Shannon and Erne Navigations, were largely transferred to the Minister for Arts, Culture and the Gaeltacht in 1996, and to Waterways Ireland in 1999.

== Organisation ==
The Commissioners comprise a Chairman (as of 2021, Maurice Buckley) and two other commissioners. The OPW's management board, which includes the chairman and commissioners, and heads of divisions - including the State Architect - is the group which directs the activities of the Office, and advises the relevant Minister and Minister of State on policy.

The Commissioners of Public Works operate under the mandate of, and are responsible for the exercise of the powers, duties and functions conferred on them by, the Public Works (Ireland) Act 1831 and subsequent legislation, to, the Minister for Public Expenditure, Infrastructure, Public Service Reform and Digitalisation. This authority has largely been delegated to the Minister of State at the Department of Public Expenditure, Infrastructure, Public Service Reform and Digitalisation with responsibility for the Office of Public Works, to whom the Office's annual report is submitted. The Minister for Public Expenditure, Infrastructure, Public Service Reform and Digitalisation remains responsible to Dáil Éireann for the exercise and performance of any powers and duties delegated to the Minister of State, and the use of certain powers by the Commissioners requires ministerial consent.

The staff of the organisation comprise part of the Civil Service of the State. The OPW is a "scheduled Office" under the Public Service Management Act 1997, which sets out arrangements for the management of Departments and Offices and the specification of individual responsibilities and accountability at a senior level. The Chairman of the Commissioners is the administrative Head of the OPW and is also the Accounting Officer for the OPW. The OPW is the subject of a specific Vote of the Oireachtas for annual funding, currently Vote 13, and receives also funding from client departments, offices and agencies - the resulting accounts are submitted to the Comptroller and Auditor-General annually.

== Publications ==
=== Official publications ===
The Commissioners of Public Works published an annual report from 1832 and 1939, halting during The Emergency, as World War II was known in Ireland. The report was resumed by the OPW in 1990, and continues to issue annually, with an electronic archive online holding reports since 2000.

The OPW also publishes a range of internal documents, including a semi-annual internal magazine, Obair.

=== Books and booklets ===
The OPW has historically published a wide range of books and booklets on Ireland's heritage properties, as well as the State's official gazette, Iris Oifigiúil, copies of bills, Acts of the Oireachtas and various other materials.

== See also ==
- Heritage sites (Republic of Ireland)
- Heritage Council (Ireland)
- Department for Communities (DfC)
- Ministry of Finance (Northern Ireland)
- Northern Ireland Environment Agency (NIEA)
