= 30th Dáil =

TDs from 2007 to 2011

←	29th Dáil	31st Dáil	→

Overview
- Legislative body: Dáil Éireann
- Jurisdiction: Ireland
- Meeting place: Leinster House
- Term: 14 June 2007 – 1 February 2011
- Election: 2007 general election
- Government: 27th government of Ireland (2007–2008); 28th government of Ireland (2008–2011)
- Members: 166
- Ceann Comhairle: Séamus Kirk — John O'Donoghue until 13 October 2009
- Taoiseach: Brian Cowen — Bertie Ahern until 7 May 2008
- Tánaiste: Mary Coughlan — Brian Cowen until 7 May 2008
- Chief Whip: John Curran — Pat Carey until 23 March 2010 — Tom Kitt until 7 May 2008
- Leader of the Opposition: Enda Kenny

Sessions
- 1st: 14 June 2007 – 5 July 2007
- 2nd: 26 September 2007 – 10 July 2008
- 3rd: 24 September 2008 – 10 July 2009
- 4th: 16 September 2009 – 8 July 2010
- 5th: 29 September 2010 – 1 February 2011

The 30th Dáil was elected at the 2007 general election on 24 May 2007 and met on 14 June 2007. The members of Dáil Éireann, the house of representatives of the Oireachtas (legislature) of Ireland, are known as TDs. It sat with the 23rd Seanad as the two Houses of the Oireachtas.

The 30th Dáil lasted 3 years, 232 days, and saw a change of Taoiseach from Bertie Ahern to Brian Cowen. The 30th Dáil was dissolved by President Mary McAleese on 1 February 2011, at the request of the Taoiseach Brian Cowen.

== Composition of the 30th Dáil ==
- 27th, 28th government coalition parties (Note: When the Progressive Democrats dissolved, their TDs became Independent politicians and remained members of the government.)

Party	May 2007	Jan. 2011	Change
Fianna Fáil	78	71	▼7
Fine Gael	51	51	Steady
Labour	20	20	Steady
Green	6	6	Steady
Sinn Féin	4	5	▲1
Progressive Democrats	2	—N/a	▼2
Independent	5	8	▲3
Ceann Comhairle	—N/a	1	▲1
Vacant	—N/a	4	▲4
Total	166		Steady

=== Graphical representation ===
This is a graphical comparison of party strengths in the 30th Dáil in January 2011, shortly before its dissolution. This was not the official seating plan.

== Ceann Comhairle ==
- Ceann Comhairle:
  - John O'Donoghue (Fianna Fáil), until 13 October 2009
  - Séamus Kirk (Fianna Fáil), from 13 October 2009
- Leas-Cheann Comhairle: Brendan Howlin (Labour Party), from 26 June 2007

On 14 June 2007, John O'Donoghue (FF) was proposed by Bertie Ahern for the position of Ceann Comhairle. Ruairi Quinn (Lab) was proposed by Pat Rabbitte and seconded by Enda Kenny. O'Donoghue was approved by a vote of 90 to 75.

On 13 October 2009, O'Donoghue resigned as Ceann Comhairle. Séamus Kirk was proposed by Brian Cowen and seconded by Mary Coughlan. Dinny McGinley (FG) was proposed by Enda Kenny and seconded by Pádraic McCormack. Kirk was approved by a vote of 87 to 51.

== Political leadership ==
=== Government ===
- Taoiseach:
  - Bertie Ahern, until 7 May 2008
  - Brian Cowen, from 7 May 2008
- Tánaiste:
  - Brian Cowen, until 7 May 2008
  - Mary Coughlan, from 7 May 2008
- Leader of Fianna Fáil:
  - Bertie Ahern, until 7 May 2008
  - Brian Cowen, until 22 January 2011
  - Micheál Martin, from 26 January 2011
- Leader of the Green Party:
  - Trevor Sargent, until 17 July 2007
  - John Gormley, from 17 July 2007 (Left government on 23 January 2011)
- Leader of the Progressive Democrats:
  - Mary Harney, until 17 April 2008
  - Ciarán Cannon, until 24 March 2009
  - Noel Grealish, from 24 March 2009 to 20 November 2009

=== Opposition ===
- Leader of the Opposition and Leader of Fine Gael: Enda Kenny
- Leader of the Labour Party:
  - Pat Rabbitte, until 6 September 2007
  - Eamon Gilmore, from 6 September 2007
- Leader of the Technical Group: Caoimhghín Ó Caoláin (Sinn Féin), from 10 December 2010

== List of TDs ==
This is a list of TDs elected to Dáil Éireann in the 2007 general election, sorted by party. The Changes table below records all changes in party affiliation.

Party	Name	Constituency
Fianna Fáil (78)	Bertie Ahern	Dublin Central
Fianna Fáil (78)	Dermot Ahern	Louth
Fianna Fáil (78)	Michael Ahern	Cork East
Fianna Fáil (78)	Noel Ahern	Dublin North-West
Fianna Fáil (78)	Barry Andrews	Dún Laoghaire
Fianna Fáil (78)	Chris Andrews	Dublin South-East
Fianna Fáil (78)	Seán Ardagh	Dublin South-Central
Fianna Fáil (78)	Bobby Aylward	Carlow–Kilkenny
Fianna Fáil (78)	Joe Behan	Wicklow
Fianna Fáil (78)	Niall Blaney	Donegal North-East
Fianna Fáil (78)	Áine Brady	Kildare North
Fianna Fáil (78)	Cyprian Brady	Dublin Central
Fianna Fáil (78)	Johnny Brady	Meath West
Fianna Fáil (78)	Séamus Brennan	Dublin South
Fianna Fáil (78)	John Browne	Wexford
Fianna Fáil (78)	Thomas Byrne	Meath East
Fianna Fáil (78)	Dara Calleary	Mayo
Fianna Fáil (78)	Pat Carey	Dublin North-West
Fianna Fáil (78)	Niall Collins	Limerick West
Fianna Fáil (78)	Margaret Conlon	Cavan–Monaghan
Fianna Fáil (78)	Seán Connick	Wexford
Fianna Fáil (78)	Mary Coughlan	Donegal South-West
Fianna Fáil (78)	Brian Cowen	Laois–Offaly
Fianna Fáil (78)	John Cregan	Limerick West
Fianna Fáil (78)	Martin Cullen	Waterford
Fianna Fáil (78)	John Curran	Dublin Mid-West
Fianna Fáil (78)	Noel Dempsey	Meath West
Fianna Fáil (78)	Jimmy Devins	Sligo–North Leitrim
Fianna Fáil (78)	Timmy Dooley	Clare
Fianna Fáil (78)	Frank Fahey	Galway West
Fianna Fáil (78)	Michael Finneran	Roscommon–South Leitrim
Fianna Fáil (78)	Michael Fitzpatrick	Kildare North
Fianna Fáil (78)	Seán Fleming	Laois–Offaly
Fianna Fáil (78)	Pat "the Cope" Gallagher	Donegal South-West
Fianna Fáil (78)	Mary Hanafin	Dún Laoghaire
Fianna Fáil (78)	Seán Haughey	Dublin North-Central
Fianna Fáil (78)	Máire Hoctor	Tipperary North
Fianna Fáil (78)	Billy Kelleher	Cork North-Central
Fianna Fáil (78)	Peter Kelly	Longford–Westmeath
Fianna Fáil (78)	Brendan Kenneally	Waterford
Fianna Fáil (78)	Michael Kennedy	Dublin North
Fianna Fáil (78)	Tony Killeen	Clare
Fianna Fáil (78)	Séamus Kirk	Louth
Fianna Fáil (78)	Michael Kitt	Galway East
Fianna Fáil (78)	Tom Kitt	Dublin South
Fianna Fáil (78)	Brian Lenihan	Dublin West
Fianna Fáil (78)	Conor Lenihan	Dublin South-West
Fianna Fáil (78)	Micheál Martin	Cork South-Central
Fianna Fáil (78)	Jim McDaid	Donegal North-East
Fianna Fáil (78)	Tom McEllistrim	Kerry North
Fianna Fáil (78)	Mattie McGrath	Tipperary South
Fianna Fáil (78)	Michael McGrath	Cork South-Central
Fianna Fáil (78)	John McGuinness	Carlow–Kilkenny
Fianna Fáil (78)	Martin Mansergh	Tipperary South
Fianna Fáil (78)	John Moloney	Laois–Offaly
Fianna Fáil (78)	Michael Moynihan	Cork North-West
Fianna Fáil (78)	Michael Mulcahy	Dublin South-Central
Fianna Fáil (78)	M. J. Nolan	Carlow–Kilkenny
Fianna Fáil (78)	Darragh O'Brien	Dublin North
Fianna Fáil (78)	Éamon Ó Cuív	Galway West
Fianna Fáil (78)	Charlie O'Connor	Dublin South-West
Fianna Fáil (78)	Willie O'Dea	Limerick East
Fianna Fáil (78)	John O'Donoghue	Kerry South
Fianna Fáil (78)	Seán Ó Fearghaíl	Kildare South
Fianna Fáil (78)	Noel O'Flynn	Cork North-Central
Fianna Fáil (78)	Rory O'Hanlon	Cavan–Monaghan
Fianna Fáil (78)	Batt O'Keeffe	Cork North-West
Fianna Fáil (78)	Ned O'Keeffe	Cork East
Fianna Fáil (78)	Mary O'Rourke	Longford–Westmeath
Fianna Fáil (78)	Christy O'Sullivan	Cork South-West
Fianna Fáil (78)	Peter Power	Limerick East
Fianna Fáil (78)	Seán Power	Kildare South
Fianna Fáil (78)	Dick Roche	Wicklow
Fianna Fáil (78)	Eamon Scanlon	Sligo–North Leitrim
Fianna Fáil (78)	Brendan Smith	Cavan–Monaghan
Fianna Fáil (78)	Noel Treacy	Galway East
Fianna Fáil (78)	Mary Wallace	Meath East
Fianna Fáil (78)	Michael Woods	Dublin North-East
Fine Gael (51)	Bernard Allen	Cork North-Central
Fine Gael (51)	James Bannon	Longford–Westmeath
Fine Gael (51)	Seán Barrett	Dún Laoghaire
Fine Gael (51)	Pat Breen	Clare
Fine Gael (51)	Richard Bruton	Dublin North-Central
Fine Gael (51)	Ulick Burke	Galway East
Fine Gael (51)	Catherine Byrne	Dublin South-Central
Fine Gael (51)	Joe Carey	Clare
Fine Gael (51)	Deirdre Clune	Cork South-Central
Fine Gael (51)	Paul Connaughton Snr	Galway East
Fine Gael (51)	Noel Coonan	Tipperary North
Fine Gael (51)	Simon Coveney	Cork South-Central
Fine Gael (51)	Seymour Crawford	Cavan–Monaghan
Fine Gael (51)	Michael Creed	Cork North-West
Fine Gael (51)	Lucinda Creighton	Dublin South-East
Fine Gael (51)	Michael W. D'Arcy	Wexford
Fine Gael (51)	John Deasy	Waterford
Fine Gael (51)	Jimmy Deenihan	Kerry North
Fine Gael (51)	Andrew Doyle	Wicklow
Fine Gael (51)	Bernard Durkan	Kildare North
Fine Gael (51)	Damien English	Meath West
Fine Gael (51)	Olwyn Enright	Laois–Offaly
Fine Gael (51)	Frank Feighan	Roscommon–South Leitrim
Fine Gael (51)	Charles Flanagan	Laois–Offaly
Fine Gael (51)	Terence Flanagan	Dublin North-East
Fine Gael (51)	Brian Hayes	Dublin South-West
Fine Gael (51)	Tom Hayes	Tipperary South
Fine Gael (51)	Phil Hogan	Carlow–Kilkenny
Fine Gael (51)	Paul Kehoe	Wexford
Fine Gael (51)	Enda Kenny	Mayo
Fine Gael (51)	Pádraic McCormack	Galway West
Fine Gael (51)	Shane McEntee	Meath East
Fine Gael (51)	Dinny McGinley	Donegal South-West
Fine Gael (51)	Joe McHugh	Donegal North-East
Fine Gael (51)	Olivia Mitchell	Dublin South
Fine Gael (51)	Denis Naughten	Roscommon–South Leitrim
Fine Gael (51)	Dan Neville	Limerick West
Fine Gael (51)	Michael Noonan	Limerick East
Fine Gael (51)	Kieran O'Donnell	Limerick East
Fine Gael (51)	Fergus O'Dowd	Louth
Fine Gael (51)	Jim O'Keeffe	Cork South-West
Fine Gael (51)	John O'Mahony	Mayo
Fine Gael (51)	John Perry	Sligo–North Leitrim
Fine Gael (51)	James Reilly	Dublin North
Fine Gael (51)	Michael Ring	Mayo
Fine Gael (51)	Alan Shatter	Dublin South
Fine Gael (51)	Tom Sheahan	Kerry South
Fine Gael (51)	P. J. Sheehan	Cork South-West
Fine Gael (51)	David Stanton	Cork East
Fine Gael (51)	Billy Timmins	Wicklow
Fine Gael (51)	Leo Varadkar	Dublin West
Labour Party (20)	Tommy Broughan	Dublin North-East
Labour Party (20)	Joan Burton	Dublin West
Labour Party (20)	Joe Costello	Dublin Central
Labour Party (20)	Eamon Gilmore	Dún Laoghaire
Labour Party (20)	Michael D. Higgins	Galway West
Labour Party (20)	Brendan Howlin	Wexford
Labour Party (20)	Ciarán Lynch	Cork South-Central
Labour Party (20)	Kathleen Lynch	Cork North-Central
Labour Party (20)	Liz McManus	Wicklow
Labour Party (20)	Brian O'Shea	Waterford
Labour Party (20)	Jan O'Sullivan	Limerick East
Labour Party (20)	Willie Penrose	Longford–Westmeath
Labour Party (20)	Ruairi Quinn	Dublin South-East
Labour Party (20)	Pat Rabbitte	Dublin South-West
Labour Party (20)	Seán Sherlock	Cork East
Labour Party (20)	Róisín Shortall	Dublin North-West
Labour Party (20)	Emmet Stagg	Kildare North
Labour Party (20)	Joanna Tuffy	Dublin Mid-West
Labour Party (20)	Mary Upton	Dublin South-Central
Labour Party (20)	Jack Wall	Kildare South
Green Party (6)	Ciarán Cuffe	Dún Laoghaire
Green Party (6)	Paul Gogarty	Dublin Mid-West
Green Party (6)	John Gormley	Dublin South-East
Green Party (6)	Eamon Ryan	Dublin South
Green Party (6)	Trevor Sargent	Dublin North
Green Party (6)	Mary White	Carlow–Kilkenny
Sinn Féin (4)	Martin Ferris	Kerry North
Sinn Féin (4)	Arthur Morgan	Louth
Sinn Féin (4)	Caoimhghín Ó Caoláin	Cavan–Monaghan
Sinn Féin (4)	Aengus Ó Snodaigh	Dublin South-Central
Progressive Democrats (2)	Noel Grealish	Galway West
Progressive Democrats (2)	Mary Harney	Dublin Mid-West
Independent (5)	Beverley Flynn	Mayo
Independent (5)	Tony Gregory	Dublin Central
Independent (5)	Jackie Healy-Rae	Kerry South
Independent (5)	Michael Lowry	Tipperary North
Independent (5)	Finian McGrath	Dublin North-Central

== Changes ==
Date	Constituency	Loss	Gain	Note
14 June 2007	Kerry South	Fianna Fáil	Ceann Comhairle	John O'Donoghue is elected Ceann Comhairle
28 November 2007	Cork East	Fianna Fáil	Independent	Ned O'Keeffe resigns from the Fianna Fáil parliamentary party
27 February 2008	Cork East	Independent	Fianna Fáil	Ned O'Keeffe rejoins the Fianna Fáil parliamentary party
8 April 2008	Mayo	Independent	Fianna Fáil	Beverley Flynn re-joins Fianna Fáil
9 July 2008	Dublin South	Fianna Fáil		Death of Séamus Brennan
17 October 2008	Wicklow	Fianna Fáil	Independent	Joe Behan resigns from Fianna Fáil
13 November 2008	Donegal North-East	Fianna Fáil	Independent	Jim McDaid loses the Fianna Fáil party whip after abstaining in a vote on a health issue
2 January 2009	Dublin Central	Independent		Death of Tony Gregory
5 June 2009	Dublin South		Fine Gael	George Lee gains the seat vacated by the death of Brennan
5 June 2009	Dublin Central		Independent	Maureen O'Sullivan holds the seat vacated by the death of Gregory
5 June 2009	Donegal South-West	Fianna Fáil		Pat "the Cope" Gallagher elected as a Member of the European Parliament
5 August 2009	Sligo–North Leitrim	Fianna Fáil	Independent	Jimmy Devins resigns the Fianna Fáil party whip in protest at cuts in cancer services at Sligo General Hospital
5 August 2009	Sligo–North Leitrim	Fianna Fáil	Independent	Eamon Scanlon resigns the Fianna Fáil party whip in protest at cuts in cancer services at Sligo General Hospital
13 October 2009	Kerry South	Ceann Comhairle	Fianna Fáil	John O'Donoghue resigns as Ceann Comhairle
13 October 2009	Louth	Fianna Fáil	Ceann Comhairle	Séamus Kirk is elected Ceann Comhairle
20 November 2009	Dublin Mid-West	Progressive Democrats	Independent	Mary Harney becomes an Independent TD following the dissolution of the Progressive Democrats
20 November 2009	Galway West	Progressive Democrats	Independent	Noel Grealish becomes an Independent TD following the dissolution of the Progressive Democrats
8 February 2010	Dublin South	Fine Gael		George Lee resigns from Dáil Éireann
24 March 2010	Waterford	Fianna Fáil		Martin Cullen resigns from Dáil Éireann
29 June 2010	Tipperary South	Fianna Fáil	Independent	Mattie McGrath loses the Fianna Fáil party whip after voting against Wildlife (Amendment) Bill 2010. Resigned from Fianna Fáil on 25 January 2011.
2 November 2010	Donegal North-East	Independent		Jim McDaid resigns from Dáil Éireann
26 November 2010	Donegal South-West		Sinn Féin	Pearse Doherty takes the seat vacated by Gallagher's election to the European Parliament
13 January 2011	Sligo–North Leitrim	Independent	Fianna Fáil	Eamon Scanlon rejoins the Fianna Fáil parliamentary party
25 January 2011	Sligo–North Leitrim	Independent	Fianna Fáil	Jimmy Devins rejoins the Fianna Fáil parliamentary party
28 January 2011	Dublin South-Central	Fianna Fáil		Seán Ardagh resigns from Dáil Éireann

On 12 July 2010, Pearse Doherty was granted leave to bring judicial review against the government seeking a declaration that due to the length of the vacancy in Donegal South-West, the government was under a duty not to oppose a motion for a writ. On 3 November 2010, Nicholas Kearns, president of the High Court, made a declaration that there has been an unreasonable delay in moving the writ for the by-election in Donegal South-West. The writ was moved the following day. However, the moving of the writ was opposed for three remaining vacancies.
