= Donegal South-West =

Dáil constituency (1961–1969, 1981–2016)

- Former Dáil constituency
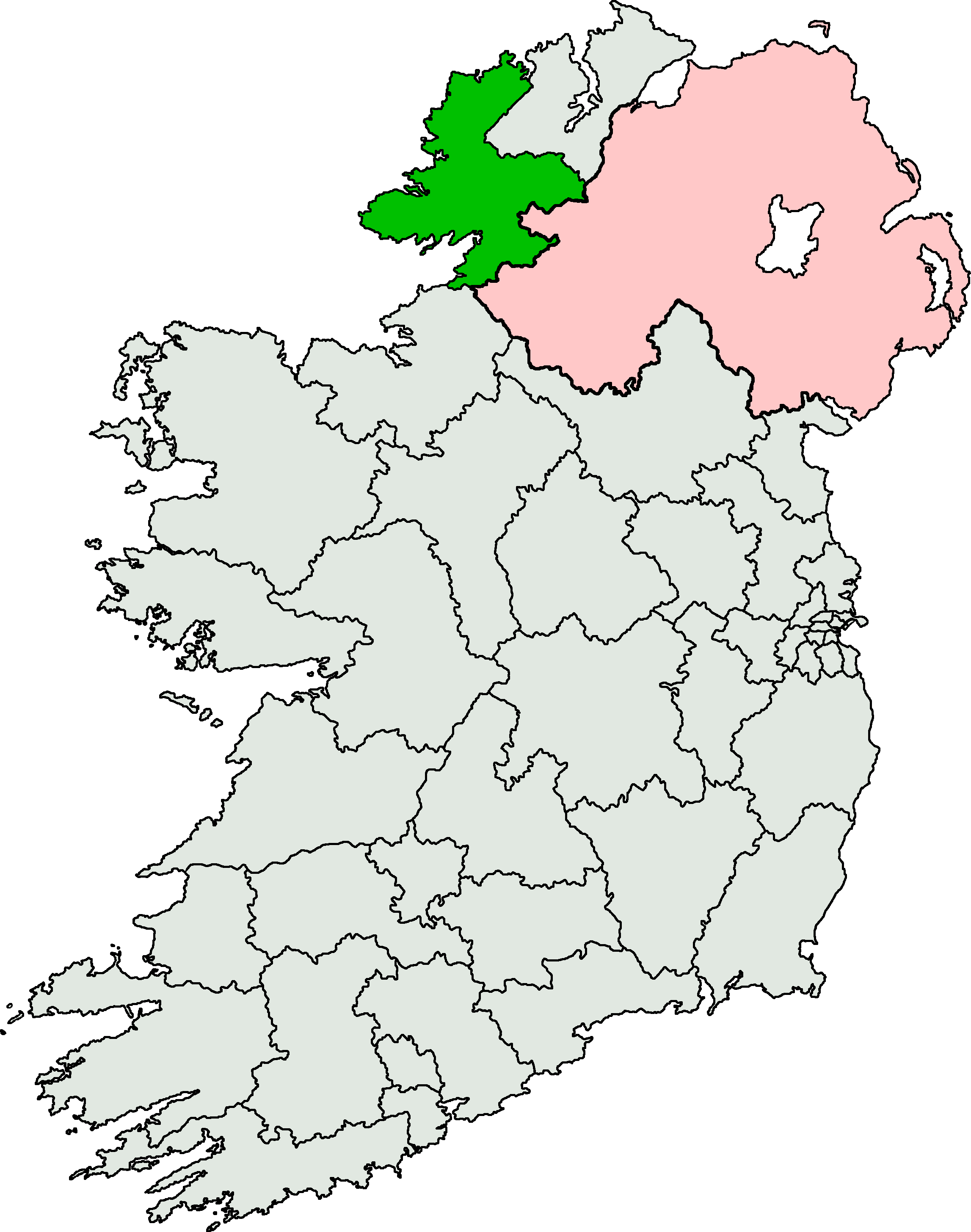
- Location of Donegal South-West within Ireland

Former constituency
- Created: 1981
- Abolished: 2016
- Seats: 3
- Local government area: County Donegal
- Replaced by: Donegal

Donegal South-West
- Former Dáil constituency

Former constituency
- Created: 1961
- Abolished: 1969
- Seats: 3
- Local government area: County Donegal
- Replaced by: Donegal–Leitrim

Donegal South-West was a parliamentary constituency represented in Dáil Éireann, the lower house of the Irish parliament or Oireachtas, from 1961 to 1969 and from 1981 to 2016. The constituency elected 3 deputies (Teachtaí Dála, commonly known as TDs). The method of election was proportional representation by means of the single transferable vote (PR-STV).

== History and boundaries ==
The constituency was first created for the 1961 general election. At the 1969 general election it was abolished and largely succeeded by the Donegal–Leitrim constituency. It was recreated for the 1981 general election. It was located in the southern and western parts of County Donegal, it included the towns of Lifford, Donegal, Ballyshannon, Killybegs and Gweedore. It was abolished again at the 2016 general election, and was succeeded by the Donegal constituency.

The Electoral (Amendment) Act 2009 defined the constituency as:

"The county of Donegal, except the part thereof which is comprised in the constituency of Donegal North-East."

== TDs ==
=== TDs 1961–1969 ===
Teachtaí Dála (TDs) for Donegal South-West 1961–1969
Key to parties: FF = Fianna Fáil; FG = Fine Gael
Dáil	Election	Deputy (Party)	Deputy (Party)	Deputy (Party)
17th	1961	Joseph Brennan (FF)	Cormac Breslin (FF)	Patrick O'Donnell (FG)
18th	1965	Joseph Brennan (FF)	Cormac Breslin (FF)	Patrick O'Donnell (FG)
19th	1969	Constituency abolished. See Donegal–Leitrim		

Note: The columns in this table are used only for presentational purposes, and no significance should be attached to the order of columns. For details of the order in which seats were won at each election, see the detailed results of that election.

=== TDs 1981–2016 ===
Teachtaí Dála (TDs) for Donegal South-West 1981–2016
Key to parties: FF = Fianna Fáil; FG = Fine Gael; SF = Sinn Féin; Ind = Independent
Dáil	Election	Deputy (Party)	Deputy (Party)	Deputy (Party)
22nd	1981	Pat "the Cope" Gallagher (FF)	Clement Coughlan (FF)	James White (FG)
23rd	1982 (Feb)	Pat "the Cope" Gallagher (FF)	Clement Coughlan (FF)	Dinny McGinley (FG)
24th	1982 (Nov)	Pat "the Cope" Gallagher (FF)	Clement Coughlan (FF)	Dinny McGinley (FG)
24th	1983 by-election	Pat "the Cope" Gallagher (FF)	Cathal Coughlan (FF)	Dinny McGinley (FG)
25th	1987	Pat "the Cope" Gallagher (FF)	Mary Coughlan (FF)	Dinny McGinley (FG)
26th	1989	Pat "the Cope" Gallagher (FF)	Mary Coughlan (FF)	Dinny McGinley (FG)
27th	1992	Pat "the Cope" Gallagher (FF)	Mary Coughlan (FF)	Dinny McGinley (FG)
28th	1997	Tom Gildea (Ind.)	Mary Coughlan (FF)	Dinny McGinley (FG)
29th	2002	Pat "the Cope" Gallagher (FF)	Mary Coughlan (FF)	Dinny McGinley (FG)
30th	2007	Pat "the Cope" Gallagher (FF)	Mary Coughlan (FF)	Dinny McGinley (FG)
30th	2010 by-election	Pearse Doherty (SF)	Mary Coughlan (FF)	Dinny McGinley (FG)
31st	2011	Pearse Doherty (SF)	Thomas Pringle (Ind.)	Dinny McGinley (FG)
32nd	2016	Constituency abolished. See Donegal		

Note: The columns in this table are used only for presentational purposes, and no significance should be attached to the order of columns. For details of the order in which seats were won at each election, see the detailed results of that election.

== Elections ==
*: Outgoing TD

=== 2011 general election ===
2011 general election: Donegal South-West
Party	Candidate	FPv%	Count				
Party	Candidate	FPv%	1	2	3	4	5
Sinn Féin	Pearse Doherty	33.0	14,262				
Fine Gael	Dinny McGinley	19.9	8,589	9,128	9,287	10,587	11,369
Independent	Thomas Pringle	13.5	5,845	7,031	7,364	9,139	10,175
Fianna Fáil	Mary Coughlan	11.5	4,956	5,172	5,259	5,655	
Fianna Fáil	Brian Ó Domhnaill	11.1	4,789	5,147	5,236	5,724	8,834
Labour	Frank McBrearty Jnr	5.1	2,209	2,882	3,003		
Independent	Stephen McCahill	4.2	1,831	2,037	2,141		
Green	John Duffy	1.2	527	668			
New Vision	Anne Sweeney (Note: New Vision was an electoral alliance of independent non-party candidates and did not appear on the ballot.)	0.6	255	382			
Electorate: 64,568 Valid: 43,263 Spoilt: 332 (0.8%) Quota: 10,816 Turnout: 43,595 (67.5%)

=== 2010 by-election ===
On 5 June 2009, Fianna Fáil TD Pat "the Cope" Gallagher was elected to the European Parliament, vacating his seat in the Dáil. The by-election was held on 25 November 2010, and was won by Pearse Doherty of Sinn Féin.

2010 by-election: Donegal South-West
Party	Candidate	FPv%	Count			
Party	Candidate	FPv%	1	2	3	4
Sinn Féin	Pearse Doherty	39.85	13,719	13,736	15,188	16,897
Fianna Fáil	Brian Ó Domhnaill	21.33	7,344	7,358	7,636	8,069
Fine Gael	Barry O'Neill	18.66	6,424	6,442	7,313	8,182
Independent	Thomas Pringle	9.99	3,438	3,491	3,763	
Labour	Frank McBrearty Jnr	9.78	3,366	3,375		
Independent	Anne Sweeney	0.39	133			
Electorate: 62,299 Valid: 34,424 Spoilt: 484 Quota: 17,213 Turnout: 57.39%

=== 2007 general election ===
2007 general election: Donegal South-West
Party	Candidate	FPv%	Count		
Party	Candidate	FPv%	1	2	3
Fianna Fáil	Mary Coughlan	26.4	10,530		
Fianna Fáil	Pat "the Cope" Gallagher	24.1	9,606	9,976	
Fine Gael	Dinny McGinley	23.0	9,167	9,249	10,281
Sinn Féin	Pearse Doherty	21.2	8,462	8,551	9,263
Labour	Séamus Rodgers	2.8	1,111	1,120	
Green	Seán Ó Maolchallann	1.5	589	596	
Independent	John Doherty	1.0	388	397	
Electorate: 60,829 Valid: 39,853 Spoilt: 421 (1.1%) Quota: 9,964 Turnout: 40,274 (66.2%)

=== 2002 general election ===
2002 general election: Donegal South-West
Party	Candidate	FPv%	Count							
Party	Candidate	FPv%	1	2	3	4	5	6	7	8
Fianna Fáil	Pat "the Cope" Gallagher	21.7	7,740	7,843	7,960	8,202	8,502	9,281		
Fianna Fáil	Mary Coughlan	20.4	7,257	7,380	7,465	7,547	8,335	8,757	8,932	
Fine Gael	James White	13.1	4,680	4,720	4,740	4,822	5,161	5,385	5,402	5,930
Fine Gael	Dinny McGinley	12.3	4,378	4,484	4,512	4,797	5,216	5,921	6,002	7,370
Independent	Joe Kelly	8.7	3,091	3,174	3,219	3,329	3,796			
Sinn Féin	Pearse Doherty	7.6	2,697	2,771	3,571	3,720	4,166	5,170	5,269	
Independent	Thomas Pringle	7.4	2,630	2,887	2,908	3,078				
Sinn Féin	Tom Dignam	3.2	1,133	1,148						
Labour	Séamus Rodgers	3.0	1,079	1,199	1,205					
Independent	Gwen Breslin	2.6	951							
Electorate: 54,789 Valid: 35,635 Spoilt: 500 (1.4%) Quota: 8,909 Turnout: 36,135 (65.9%)

=== 1997 general election ===
1997 general election: Donegal South-West
Party	Candidate	FPv%	Count					
Party	Candidate	FPv%	1	2	3	4	5	6
Fianna Fáil	Mary Coughlan	20.3	6,597	6,620	6,877	7,192	7,548	8,203
Fianna Fáil	Enda Bonner	17.7	5,742	5,751	5,832	5,946	6,000	6,745
Fine Gael	Dinny McGinley	17.5	5,679	5,695	5,973	6,222	7,434	8,165
Independent	Tom Gildea	17.3	5,592	5,651	5,925	6,370	6,489	7,983
Independent Fianna Fáil	Paddy Kelly (Note: Independent Fianna Fáil was an unregistered political party and did not appear on the ballot.)	12.7	4,123	4,175	4,250	4,415	4,515	
Fine Gael	Frank O'Kelly	5.5	1,774	1,783	1,873	2,053		
Green	Elizabeth Cullen	4.2	1,366	1,387	1,643			
Labour	Manus Brennan	4.2	1,361	1,367				
Independent	Tom Kennedy	0.6	206					
Electorate: 51,479 Valid: 32,440 Spoilt: 454 (1.4%) Quota: 8,111 Turnout: 32,894 (63.9%)

=== 1992 general election ===
1992 general election: Donegal South-West
Party	Candidate	FPv%	Count						
Party	Candidate	FPv%	1	2	3	4	5	6	7
Fianna Fáil	Pat "the Cope" Gallagher	26.4	7,870						
Fianna Fáil	Mary Coughlan	22.3	6,639	6,915	6,962	7,033	7,178	7,317	7,624
Fine Gael	Jim White	19.3	5,745	5,762	5,792	5,836	5,966	6,009	6,379
Fine Gael	Dinny McGinley	18.5	5,504	5,564	5,576	5,731	5,855	5,937	6,588
Democratic Left	Séamus Rodgers	6.1	1,825	1,863	1,881	1,974	2,058	2,201	
Independent	Benny Mooney	2.4	700	705	711	765			
Sinn Féin	Anna Rose Doherty	1.9	577	583	828	855	905		
Independent	Fred Coll	1.8	539	551	557				
Sinn Féin	John McCluskey	1.4	409	412					
Electorate: 48,528 Valid: 29,808 Spoilt: 688 (2.3%) Quota: 7,453 Turnout: 30,496 (62.8%)

=== 1989 general election ===
1989 general election: Donegal South-West
Party	Candidate	FPv%	Count	
Party	Candidate	FPv%	1	2
Fianna Fáil	Pat "the Cope" Gallagher	28.9	8,332	
Fianna Fáil	Mary Coughlan	26.3	7,592	
Fine Gael	Dinny McGinley	24.8	7,160	7,534
Workers' Party	Séamus Rodgers	9.6	2,768	3,338
Fine Gael	Frank O'Kelly	8.6	2,493	2,573
Independent	Tom Kennedy	1.8	521	612
Electorate: 47,027 Valid: 28,866 Quota: 7,217 Turnout: 61.4%

=== 1987 general election ===
1987 general election: Donegal South-West
Party	Candidate	FPv%	Count				
Party	Candidate	FPv%	1	2	3	4	5
Fianna Fáil	Mary Coughlan	30.7	9,698				
Fianna Fáil	Pat "the Cope" Gallagher	27.5	8,686				
Fine Gael	Dinny McGinley	20.1	6,331	6,811	7,008	7,158	9,821
Fine Gael	Francis O'Kelly	9.7	3,072	3,452	3,505	3,614	
Workers' Party	Séamus Rodgers	8.0	2,512	3,030	3,465	4,085	4,344
Sinn Féin	Eamonn Monaghan	4.0	1,276	1,702	1,809		
Electorate: 45,871 Valid: 31,575 Quota: 7,894 Turnout: 68.8%

=== 1983 by-election ===
Fianna Fáil TD Clement Coughlan died on 1 February 1983. The seat was won by the Fianna Fáil candidate Cathal Coughlan, brother of the deceased TD.

1983 by-election: Donegal South-West
Party	Candidate	FPv%	Count		
Party	Candidate	FPv%	1	2	3
Fianna Fáil	Cathal Coughlan	56.6	17,960		
Fine Gael	J. J. Reid	31.1	9,870	10,512	10,731
Workers' Party	Séamus Rodgers	9.4	2,992	4,021	4,435
Independent	Eamon Ó Gallachoir	1.7	530	802	
Independent	Leo Armstrong	1.2	373	490	
Independent	Jim Tallon	0.1	37	55	
Electorate: 45,823 Valid: 31,762 Quota: 15,882 Turnout: 69.3%

Cathal Coughlan died on 21 June 1986. On 22 October 1986, a Fianna Fáil motion to issue the writ, opposed by the Fine Gael–Labour government, was rejected by a vote of 81 to 82.

=== November 1982 general election ===
November 1982 general election: Donegal South-West
Party	Candidate	FPv%	Count			
Party	Candidate	FPv%	1	2	3	4
Fianna Fáil	Clement Coughlan	29.5	9,483			
Fine Gael	Dinny McGinley	26.5	8,544			
Fianna Fáil	Pat "the Cope" Gallagher	25.4	8,165			
Fine Gael	Francis O'Kelly	12.5	4,035	4,815	5,270	5,290
Workers' Party	Séamus Rodgers	6.1	1,972	2,625	2,664	2,759
Electorate: 45,334 Valid: 32,199 Quota: 8,050 Turnout: 71.0%

=== February 1982 general election ===
February 1982 general election: Donegal South-West
Party	Candidate	FPv%	Count		
Party	Candidate	FPv%	1	2	3
Fianna Fáil	Clement Coughlan	25.1	8,321		
Fianna Fáil	Pat "the Cope" Gallagher	22.9	7,576	8,011	8,270
Fine Gael	Dinny McGinley	21.6	7,160	7,419	10,925
Fine Gael	J J Reid	12.4	4,113	4,300	
Independent Fianna Fáil	Patrick Kelly (Note: Independent Fianna Fáil was an unregistered political party and did not appear on the ballot.)	11.7	3,868	4,877	5,036
Sinn Féin The Workers' Party	Séamus Rodgers	3.2	1,056		
Independent	Daniel Harkin	3.1	1,013		
Electorate: 44,860 Valid: 33,107 Spoilt: 253 (0.8%) Quota: 8,277 Turnout: 33,360 (74.4%)

=== 1981 general election ===
1981 general election: Donegal South-West
Party	Candidate	FPv%	Count			
Party	Candidate	FPv%	1	2	3	4
Fianna Fáil	Clement Coughlan	26.9	9,341			
Fine Gael	James White	23.4	8,117	8,167	12,271	
Fianna Fáil	Pat "the Cope" Gallagher	18.5	6,433	6,969	7,348	7,762
Independent Fianna Fáil	Patrick Kelly (Note: Independent Fianna Fáil was an unregistered political party and did not appear on the ballot.)	16.2	5,626	5,684	6,197	7,038
Fine Gael	Dinny McGinley	14.9	5,199	5,216		
Electorate: 44,860 Valid: 34,716 Spoilt: 335 (0.9%) Quota: 8,680 Turnout: 35,051 (78.1%)

=== 1965 general election ===
1965 general election: Donegal South-West
Party	Candidate	FPv%	Count	
Party	Candidate	FPv%	1	2
Fianna Fáil	Joseph Brennan	27.3	7,020	
Fine Gael	Patrick O'Donnell	26.1	6,691	
Fianna Fáil	Cormac Breslin	24.3	6,240	6,804
Fine Gael	James White	16.7	4,298	4,326
Fine Gael	Frank Reid	5.6	1,432	1,439
Electorate: 35,828 Valid: 25,681 Quota: 6,421 Turnout: 71.7%

=== 1961 general election ===
1961 general election: Donegal South-West
Party	Candidate	FPv%	Count		
Party	Candidate	FPv%	1	2	3
Fianna Fáil	Joseph Brennan	29.8	7,045		
Fine Gael	Patrick O'Donnell	23.3	5,512	5,546	6,030
Fine Gael	Christopher Gallagher	19.5	4,599	4,660	4,864
Fianna Fáil	Cormac Breslin	19.2	4,536	5,552	5,927
Sinn Féin	Séamus Rodgers	8.2	1,930	1,958	
Electorate: 36,231 Valid: 23,622 Quota: 5,906 Turnout: 65.2%
