= McBrearty =

McBrearty is a surname. Notable people with the surname include:

- Don McBrearty, Canadian film director
- Frank McBrearty Snr, Irish businessman
- Frank McBrearty Jnr, Irish politician
- Patrick McBrearty (born 1993), Irish Gaelic footballer
- Stephen McBrearty, Irish Gaelic footballer and younger brother of Patrick
