= 1980 Donegal by-election =

By-election to the 21st Dáil

- 6 November 1980
- Turnout: 60,077 (73.9%)
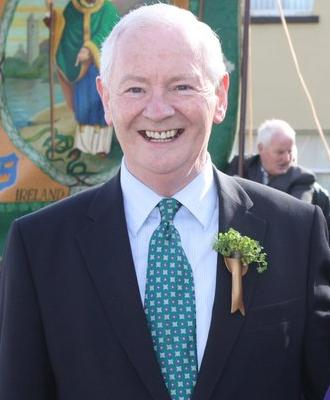
	Coughlan		Kelly
Nominee	Clement Coughlan	Dinny McGinley	Paddy Kelly (Note: Kelly was a member of Independent Fianna Fáil, an unregistered political party, and appeared on the ballot as a non-party independent.)
Party	Fianna Fáil	Fine Gael	Independent Fianna Fáil
First preferences	23,456	20,022	14,198
Percentage	39.0%	33.3%	23.6%
Final count	29,219	24,085	–
TD before election
Joseph Brennan
Ceann Comhairle
TD after election
Clement Coughlan
Fianna Fáil

A Dáil by-election was held in the constituency of Donegal in Ireland on Thursday, 6 November 1980, to fill a vacancy in the 21st Dáil. It followed the death of the Ceann Comhairle Joseph Brennan (Note: Brennan was elected as a Fianna Fáil TD at the 1977 general election before being elected as Ceann Comhairle.) on 13 July 1980.

A government motion to issue the writ of election to fill the vacancy was agreed by the Dáil on 16 October 1980. The by-election was won by the Fianna Fáil candidate Clement Coughlan.

Coughlan died in a road traffic accident in early 1983, leading to the 1983 Donegal South-West by-election.

== Result ==
1980 Donegal by-election
Party	Candidate	FPv%	Count		
Party	Candidate	FPv%	1	2	3
Fianna Fáil	Clement Coughlan	39.0	23,456	24,000	29,219
Fine Gael	Dinny McGinley	33.3	20,022	20,793	24,085
Independent Fianna Fáil	Paddy Kelly	23.6	14,198	14,992	
Sinn Féin The Workers' Party	Séamus Rodgers	4.0	2,401		
Electorate: 81,340 Valid: 60,077 Quota: 30,039 Turnout: 73.9%
