= Technical group =

Group of elected officials, not directly based on ideology

In parliamentary politics, a technical group or mixed group is a heterogeneous group of elected officials who are of differing ideologies, comprising multiple small political parties, independent politicians, or a combination of both. They can be distinguished from more conventional parliamentary groups which have a coherent political ideology (such as all members of the group being from the same political party). Technical groups are formed for technical reasons, so that members enjoy certain rights or benefits that would otherwise remain unavailable to them outside a formally recognized parliamentary group.

== Ireland ==
In Dáil Éireann (the lower house of the Irish national parliament, the Oireachtas), prior to 2016, only parliamentary groups with seven TDs or more had full speaking rights under the house's standing orders. This meant that smaller parties and independent politicians would be unable to speak as often as parties with enough deputies to form their own groups. Prior to 1997, a technical group automatically came into being if there were seven or more independent TDs. From 1997, a group of TDs must agree to form a group. Under standing orders, only one technical group could exist at any time, with at least seven members and comprising a majority of deputies who are not members of another group in Dáil Éireann.

In the wake of the 2016 Irish general election, which saw a significant increase in the number of TDs elected as independents or from small parties in the 32nd Dáil, the Dáil standing orders were extensively revised to reduce the minimum number for formation of a parliamentary group from seven TDs to five, and to allow multiple technical groups to exist in parallel.

Recent examples of technical groups include:

- 27th Dáil: a group of nine deputies formed in 1992.
- 29th Dáil: a loose federation of 22 opposition deputies.
- 30th Dáil: a technical group was not created initially after the 2007 general election, because there were only five potential members – Sinn Féin's four deputies and the left-wing independent Tony Gregory. Most outgoing independents from the 29th Dáil lost their seats, Sinn Féin was reduced to four, the six Green Party TDs became part of the government and three out of the four remaining independents made confidence-and-supply arrangements with the government. The election of Pearse Doherty of Sinn Féin in a 2010 by-election allowed the formation of a group of seven, comprising the five Sinn Féin TDs and the left-wing independents Finian McGrath and Maureen O'Sullivan.
- 31st Dail: after the 2011 general election, 16 of the 19 independent and United Left Alliance TDs agreed to form a technical group. Catherine Murphy was the group's whip, while Maureen O'Sullivan was assistant whip. Finian McGrath resigned as chairman in October 2012 when Mick Wallace rejoined the loose group, against the wishes of many of its members. The independent TDs who chose not to join this technical group were: Michael Healy-Rae, Michael Lowry and Noel Grealish.
- 32nd Dáil: Standing orders were revised to allow multiple technical groups to coexist. One group was formed between the three members of the Social Democrats and the two members of the Green Party. Another technical group was formed around the four members of Independents 4 Change, together with the non-party TDs Catherine Connolly, Thomas Pringle and Maureen O'Sullivan. A third group called the Rural Independents Group was also formed, comprising 7 members.
- 34th Dáil: three technical groups were formed:
  - the Regional Independent Group (containing 6 independent TDs)
  - the Independent Group (7 TDs: 4 from Independent Ireland, 2 Aontú and independent Paul Gogarty)
  - the Independents and Smaller Parties Group (8 TDs: 3 PBP–S, 3 independent, 1 100% Redress and 1 Green)

== European Parliament ==
Political groups of the European Parliament are required by that parliament's standing orders to have a coherent "complexion" of political principles. Despite this rule, a "Technical Group of Independents" comprising members from dissimilar political ideologies has been formed on two occasions: from 1979 until 1984 and between 1999 and 2001. Such was the mixed nature of the latter group that it drew the disapproval of the Committee on Constitutional Affairs, which attempted to disband the group within months of its creation; after legal appeals, the disbandment was finally confirmed by a ruling of the European Court of Justice, making it unlikely that technical groups will reappear within the European Parliament in the future.

== France ==
In France, during the nineteenth-century and first half of the twentieth century, most French national politicians were independents, that is elected without formally belonging to a campaign party.

The first modern French political parties date from the early 1900s (foundation of Action libérale and the Parti radical). The first legislation on political parties dates from 1911, though it was not until 1928 that parliamentarians were required to select a political party for the parliamentary register (either by formally joining a group, or by loosely working with one as an apparenté, or associate), and not until after 1945 that structured political parties came to dominate parliamentary work.

However, long before this the development of parliamentary committees during the First World War created an incentive to belong to a parliamentary party. As there were fourteen main parliamentary committees, and spaces for them were distributed to parliamentary parties first and independents last, the smaller parties and independents began to either attach themselves informally to a main political party (such loose associates of parliamentary parties were termed apparantés), or to band together to create ad-hoc technical groups for the duration of the legislature. In 1932, for instance, the French Chamber contained four technical groups: the left-of-centre Independent Left, with 12 deputies drawn from the Alsatian regional Communist and Radical parties as well as independent deputies of socialist or Radical temperament; the centre-right conservative-liberal Independents of the Left, with 26 deputies; the right-wing agrarian Independents for Economic, Social and Peasant Action, with six deputies; and the far-right monarchist Independent Group, with 12 deputies. These four technical groups thus accounted for almost 10% of parliamentary seats.
