= 1983 Donegal South-West by-election =

By-election to the 24th Dáil

- 13 May 1983
- Turnout: 31,762 (69.3%)
	Coughlan	Reid	Rodgers
Nominee	Cathal Coughlan	J. J. Reid	Séamus Rodgers
Party	Fianna Fáil	Fine Gael	Workers' Party
First preferences	17,960	9,870	2,992
Percentage	56.6%	31.1%	9.4%
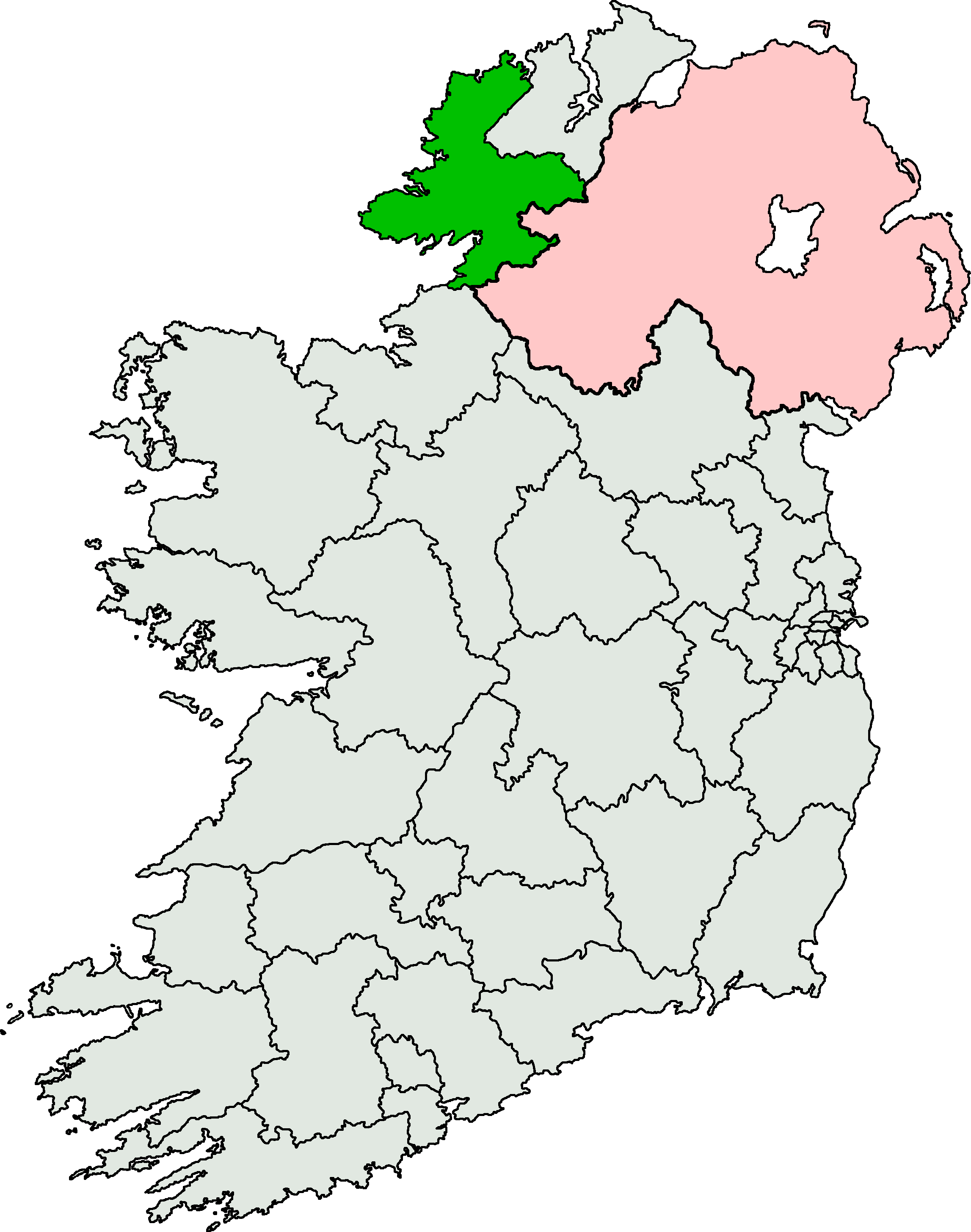
- Donegal South-West shown within Ireland
TD before election
Clement Coughlan
Fianna Fáil
TD after election
Cathal Coughlan
Fianna Fáil

A Dáil by-election was held in the constituency of Donegal South-West in Ireland on Friday, 13 May 1983, to fill a vacancy in the 24th Dáil. It followed the death of Fianna Fáil Teachta Dála (TD) Clement Coughlan on 1 February 1983.

On 19 April 1983, the writ of election to fill the vacancy was issued.

The by-election was won by the Fianna Fáil candidate Cathal Coughlan, brother of the deceased TD, Clement Coughlan.

Cathal Coughlan died on 21 June 1986. On 22 October 1986, a Fianna Fáil motion to issue the writ, opposed by the Fine Gael–Labour government, was rejected by a vote of 81 to 82.

No by-election was held to fill the vacancy, but Cathal Coughlan's daughter, Mary Coughlan, was elected for the constituency at the 1987 general election.

== Result ==
1983 Donegal South-West by-election
Party	Candidate	FPv%	Count		
Party	Candidate	FPv%	1	2	3
Fianna Fáil	Cathal Coughlan	56.6	17,960		
Fine Gael	J. J. Reid	31.1	9,870	10,512	10,731
Workers' Party	Séamus Rodgers	9.4	2,992	4,021	4,435
Independent	Eamon Ó Gallachoir	1.7	530	802	
Independent	Leo Armstrong	1.2	373	490	
Independent	Jim Tallon	0.1	37	55	
Electorate: 45,823 Valid: 31,762 Quota: 15,882 Turnout: 69.3%
