= Cathal Coughlan =

Cathal Coughlan may refer to:

- Cathal Coughlan (politician) (1937–1986), Irish Fianna Fáil politician
- Cathal Coughlan (musician) (1960–2022), Irish singer songwriter
