= 2010 Donegal South-West by-election =

By-election to the 30th Dáil

- 25 November 2010
- Turnout: 34,908 (57.4%)

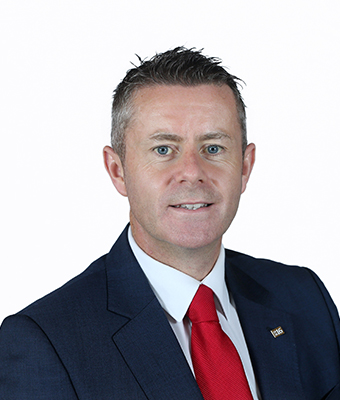
		O'Neill
Nominee	Pearse Doherty	Barry O'Neill	Brian Ó Domhnaill
Party	Sinn Féin	Fine Gael	Fianna Fáil
First preferences	13,719	6,424	7,344
Percentage	39.8%	18.7%	21.3%
Final count	16,897	8,182	8,069
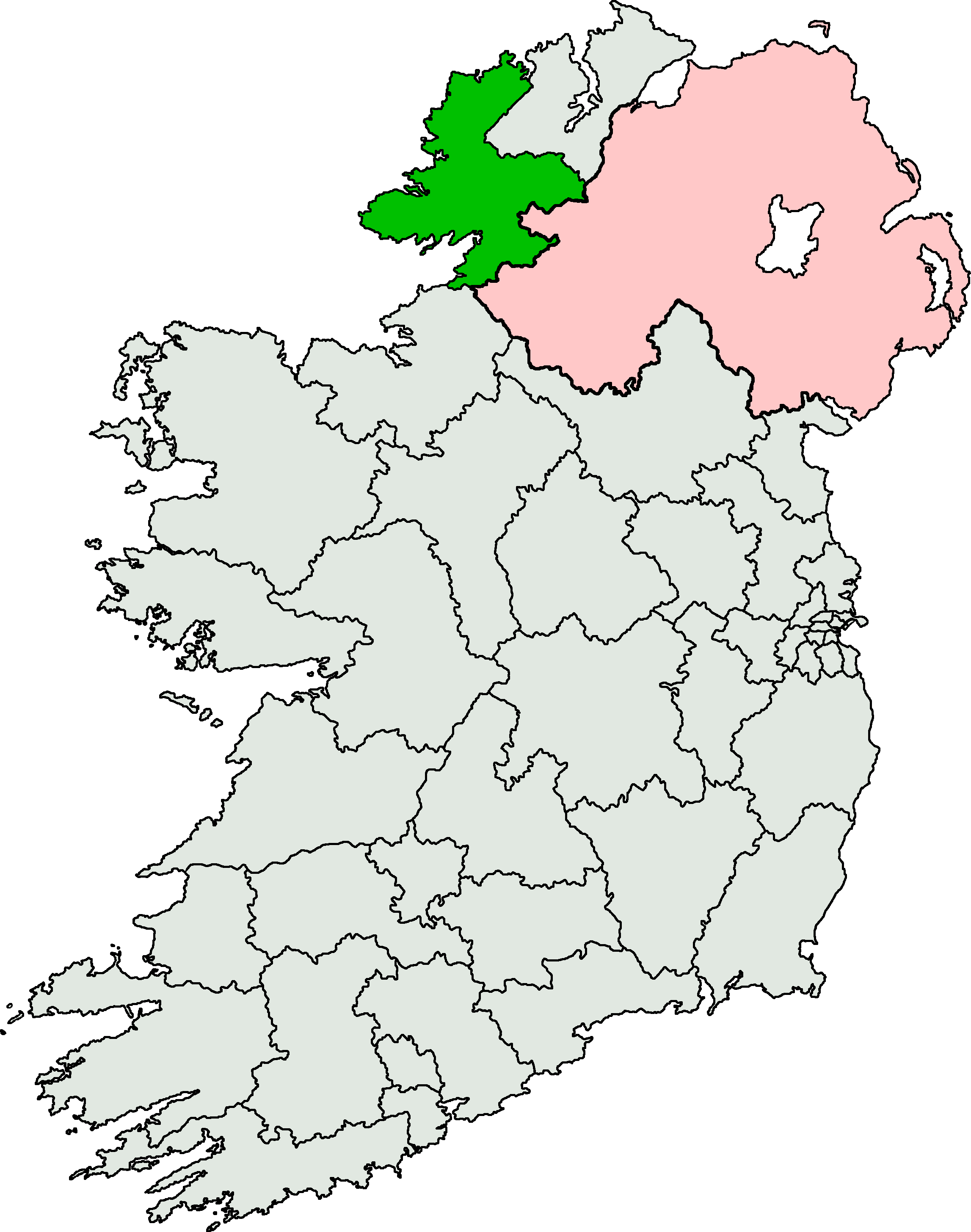
- Donegal South-West shown within Ireland
TD before election
Pat "the Cope" Gallagher
Fianna Fáil
TD after election
Pearse Doherty
Sinn Féin

A Dáil by-election was held in the constituency of Donegal South-West in Ireland on Thursday, 25 November 2010, to fill a vacancy in the 30th Dáil. It followed the election of Fianna Fáil Teachta Dála (TD) Pat "the Cope" Gallagher to the European Parliament at the June 2009 election. Most voters cast their ballots on 25 November 2010; 754 voters on offshore islands (Arranmore, Tory, Inishbofin, Gola, and Inishfree) were entitled to cast their ballots on 22 November.

When a vacancy occurs in the Dáil, the writ for a by-election to fill the vacancy is moved in the Dáil. Possessing a small majority in the Dáil, the government had delayed in calling this by-election. There was no specific legal requirement on when to hold a by-election. The 17-month gap between the seat becoming vacant and the writ being moved is the longest in the history of the state.

Sinn Féin senator Pearse Doherty was elected on the fourth count.

== Legal challenge ==
Due to the delay in the Government holding the by-election, a number of attempts to force the by-election were carried out by the Opposition. On 2 July 2009, Sinn Féin proposed to issue the writ for Donegal South-West, it was defeated by 72 votes to 69.

On 5 May 2010, Sinn Féin again attempted to force the holding of the by-election. The Government narrowly avoided a defeat in the motion calling for the by-election to be held immediately when two of their TDs accidentally voted with the opposition.

On 12 July 2010, the High Court granted leave to Sinn Féin senator Pearse Doherty for a judicial review into why the by-election was not being held.

On 29 September 2010, Fine Gael proposed to issue the writ for Donegal South-West and two other vacancies, it was defeated by 81 votes to 77.

On 2 November 2010, the High Court ruled that there was an unreasonable delay in holding the by-election. In his ruling, High Court President Justice Nicholas Kearns described the delay as unprecedented and that the delay amounted to a breach of Doherty's constitutional rights. He declared that Section 30 (2) of the Electoral Act 1992 should be construed as requiring that a writ for a by-election be moved within a reasonable time of the vacancy arising. He further stated that:

...it is the ongoing failure to move the writ for this by-election since June 2009 which offends the terms and spirit of the Constitution and its framework for democratic representation.

However, Justice Kearns did not order the government to set a date for the by-election. The government announced on 4 November 2010 that the by-election would be held on 25 November. They also stated that they would appeal to the Supreme Court.

== Campaign ==
The election campaign took place during an unprecedented crisis in state finances:

- record falls in bond market rates for Irish government debt.
- a fact-finding visit by European Commissioner for Economic and Financial Affairs, Olli Rehn to review the government budgetary plans.
- a joint team from the International Monetary Fund (IMF), the European Commission and the European Central Bank arrived to begin discussions about international loan assistance for the state and the banks.
- the Government put the finishing touches to the 2011 budget, expected to impose a set of stringent cuts as part of a four-year plan to reduce the government deficit from 13% of GDP to 3%.

An opinion poll in the week prior to polling gave Pearse Doherty 40% of the first preference vote, with Fianna Fáil's Brian O'Domhnaill with 19%.

On 22 November, Taoiseach Brian Cowen announced his intention to call a general election in early 2011, once the budget had been passed. Candidate Anne Sweeney unofficially withdrew on 23 November and advised voters to boycott the by-election, describing it as "a complete farce" given the likelihood of a proximate general election.

== Result ==
Following the redistribution of Thomas Pringle's votes, Pearse Doherty was deemed elected on the fourth count.

2010 Donegal South-West by-election
Party	Candidate	FPv%	Count			
Party	Candidate	FPv%	1	2	3	4
Sinn Féin	Pearse Doherty	39.8	13,719	13,736	15,188	16,897
Fianna Fáil	Brian Ó Domhnaill	21.3	7,344	7,358	7,636	8,069
Fine Gael	Barry O'Neill	18.7	6,424	6,442	7,313	8,182
Independent	Thomas Pringle	10.0	3,438	3,491	3,763	
Labour	Frank McBrearty Jnr	9.8	3,366	3,375		
Independent	Anne Sweeney	0.4	133			
Electorate: 62,299 Valid: 34,424 Spoilt: 484 Quota: 17,213 Turnout: 34,908 (57.4%)

== Aftermath ==
CNN noted that support for the three left-leaning candidates, Pearse Doherty, Thomas Pringle and Frank McBrearty, Jnr, added up to 60% of the poll. Doherty said that the vote was a rejection of the interference of the IMF in Irish affairs and said he would be voting against the 2011 Budget on 7 December. After negotiations with left-wing Independent TDs Finian McGrath and Maureen O'Sullivan, a Technical Group was formed in the Dáil to give its members more speaking time. The Fianna Fáil vote dropped from 50% at the 2007 general election to 21% at this by-election. The government majority in the Dáil was reduced to two.

The by-election served as a preview to the February 2011 general election, which resulted in a meltdown for the Fianna Fáil party. In July 2011 the new Fine Gael–Labour coalition introduced a bill, passed by the Oireachtas as the Electoral (Amendment) Act 2011, among whose provisions was a maximum seat vacancy of six months before a Dáil by-election would be obligatory.
