= Frank McBrearty Jnr =

Irish politician and businessman

Cllr Frank McBrearty Jnr
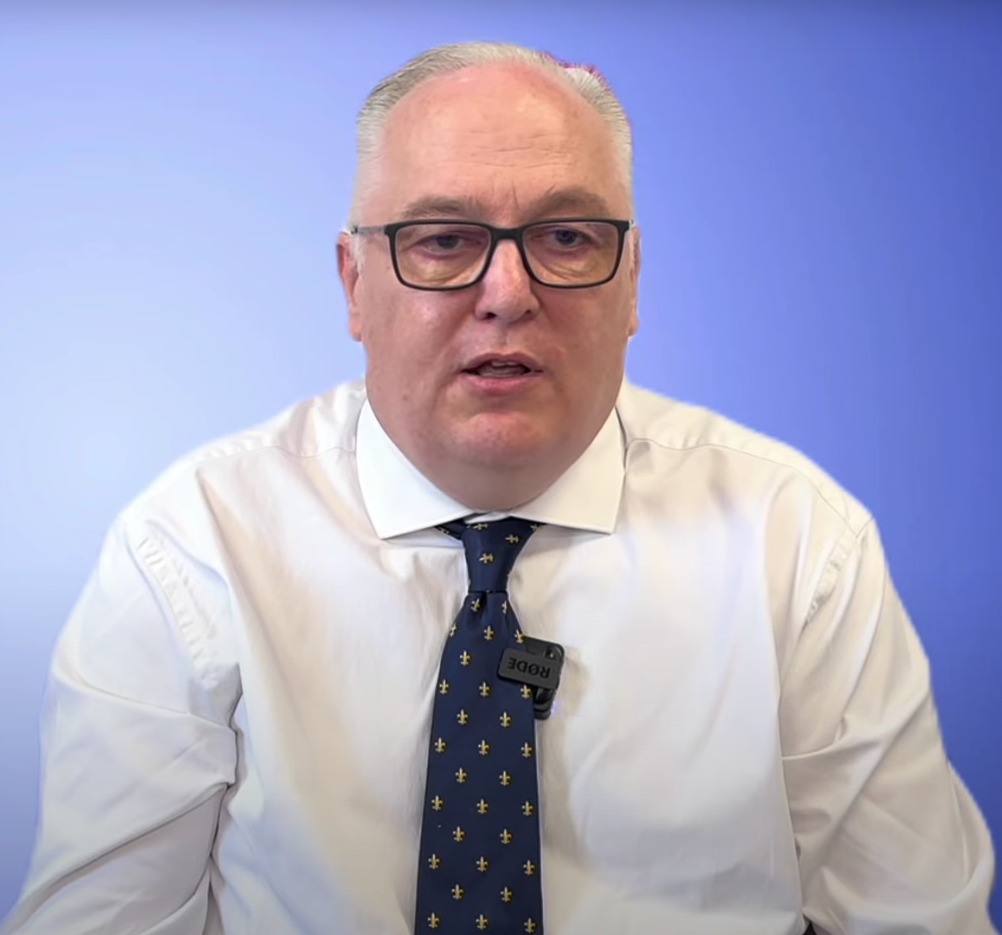
- McBrearty in 2024

Donegal County Councillor
- Incumbent
- Assumed office June 2009
- Constituency: Lifford–Stranorlar (2019–present); Stranorlar (2009–2019)

Personal details
- Party: Independent
- Other political affiliations: Labour Party (2009–2013); Fine Gael (April to May 2019)

Frank McBrearty Jnr is an Irish politician and businessman, who has been a County Councillor on Donegal County Council since 2009. The son of Frank McBrearty Snr, McBrearty became known nationally as a result of the Morris Tribunal's ruling that police had tried to frame him for the 1996 murder of Richie Barron. McBrearty pursued the Irish state in a long-running legal battle to "restore his good name". In 2005, he settled all his claims against the Irish state.

McBrearty was in court in 2012, when a landmark judgement found in favour of him and his wife against Allied Irish Banks (AIB).

== Politics ==
McBrearty ran in the 2009 local elections for the Labour Party. He stood in the Stranorlar local electoral area, and was elected to Donegal County Council. He stood in the 2010 Donegal South-West by-election, though was unsuccessful. During the campaign he told the County Manager to "fuck off" and insisted he would not apologise for doing so. Three months later he stood in the 2011 general election, and was again unsuccessful.

He served as Mayor of Donegal from 2012 to 2013. He was critical of "militant protests" against leaders such as Enda Kenny, claiming they only bring shame and negative publicity, and has criticised public representatives such as Thomas Pringle for joining with people in demonstrating against members of the ruling parties. At the county council meeting on 1 October 2013, McBrearty confirmed that he had left the Labour Party.

He was re-elected in Stranorlar as an Independent in 2014. McBrearty ran in the 2016 general election as an independent candidate for the new five-seater Donegal constituency. After achieving just 1,914 first-preference votes, and being eliminated on the fourth count, he posted an angry social media post beginning "Next bastard that comes to my door will know all about it. After helping over 8000 people in 7 years on the council this is how your [sic] rewarded. My vote is down everywhere." McBrearty accused voters of abandoning him and the media of vilifying him. He also announced his intention to leave politics when his current council term ended.

In late May 2019 he was again elected, this time for the Lifford-Stanorlar local electoral area, and for the Fine Gael party, having joined that party two months earlier. But by the start of June he had resigned from the party and said he intended to sue it for post-traumatic stress disorder, after claiming that he was "the victim of internal party bullying". He also threatened to "make the council unworkable" if he was "excluded from power-sharing".

== Phone theft allegations ==
McBrearty has been accused of act(ing) like (a) thug... at a council meeting in Buncrana in which he allegedly and forcibly removed or stole a mobile device from another elected official. Gardai are investigating the incident, which McBrearty denies despite several witnesses. McBrearty has made reference to a phone being in the middle of the Atlantic. In September 2025, McBrearty appeared at Letterkenny District Court, charged with the theft of fellow councillor Gary Doherty's mobile phone.
