= Brian Ó Domhnaill =

Irish politician (born 1977)

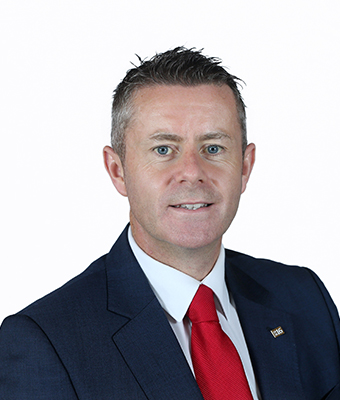
- Ó Domhnaill in 2016

Senator
- In office 25 May 2011 – 29 June 2020
- Constituency: Agricultural Panel
- In office 13 September 2007 – 25 May 2011
- Constituency: Nominated by the Taoiseach

Personal details
- Born: 18 October 1977 (age 48) Falcarragh, County Donegal, Ireland
- Party: Independent (since 2016)
- Other political affiliations: Fianna Fáil (until 2016)
- Education: University of Ulster
- Website: brianodomhnaill.ie

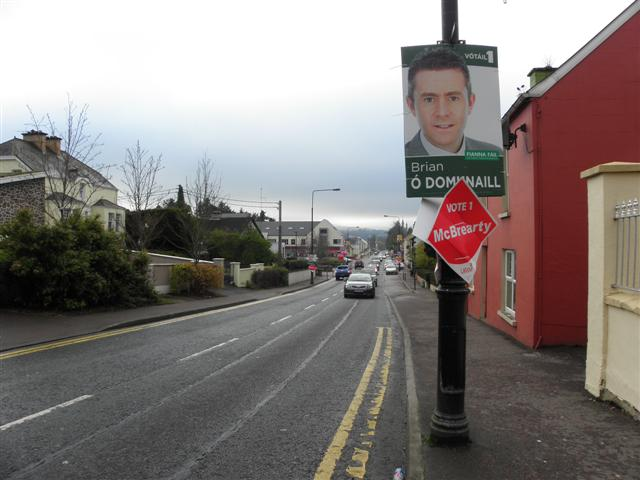
An Ó Domhnaill election poster on Stranorlar main street during the 2010 Donegal South-West by-election.

Brian Ó Domhnaill (Irish pronunciation: [ˈbʲɾʲiənˠ oː ˈd̪ˠoːnˠəl̠ʲ]; born 18 October 1977) is an Irish former Independent politician who served as a Senator for the Agricultural Panel from August 2007 to March 2020. He previously represented Fianna Fáil.

== Early life ==
Ó Domhnaill is from Falcarragh in County Donegal. He attended the University of Ulster where he obtained a bachelor's degree in Food Technology Management. He was a sports scholarship student at the university and is a former Irish international athlete.

== Political career ==
A member of Donegal County Council for the Glenties area from 2004 to 2007, Ó Domhnaill topped the poll on his first occasion running as the Fianna Fáil candidate in the Glenties local electoral area. He was an unsuccessful candidate at the Seanad election for the Industrial and Commercial Panel in 2007. He was elected to Údarás na Gaeltachta board in 1999 and re-elected in 2005. Ó Domhnaill was nominated by the Taoiseach, Bertie Ahern to the Seanad on 3 August 2007.

Ó Domhnaill was the Fianna Fáil candidate in the 2010 by-election in the Donegal South-West constituency, which was held on 25 November 2010. He received 7,344 first preference votes (21.3%) and finished in third place on the final count. The seat was won by Pearse Doherty of Sinn Féin. He was also an unsuccessful candidate at the 2011 general election for Donegal South-West.

Ó Domhnaill was elected to the Seanad on the Agricultural Panel in April 2011.

In July 2013, during the Protection of Life During Pregnancy Bill 2013 Seanad debate, Ó Domhnaill claimed that allowing abortions in the case of foetal anomalies would deprive Ireland of future Special Olympics athletes. He also remarked that babies with Down's syndrome could be "left to die on sterilised trays".

In December 2016, Ó Domhnaill resigned from the Fianna Fáil party after he was found to have breached ethics legislation.

However, with the support of the Irish Greyhound Owners and Breeders' Federation, Ó Domhnaill was a candidate, again for the Agricultural Panel, in the March 2020 Seanad election. This set him against former Fianna Fáil TD Niall Blaney. Ó Domhnaill lost his seat, to Blaney, in the 2020 Seanad election.

== Controversy ==
=== Ethics and expenses scandal ===
Ó Domhnaill took €109,428 in expenses between the formation of the 23rd Seanad in 2007 and 2009. He took expenses of €56,000 between 2005 and 2009 from being a board member of Údarás na Gaeltachta.

On 20 November 2012, the Standards in Public Office Commission (SIPO) announced a formal investigation into allegations relating to Ó Domhnaill's travel and subsistence expenses claims. On 6 June 2013, the commission announced that it was postponing its investigation into Ó Domhnaill until a later date.

This followed a number of legal challenges by Ó Domhnaill who managed to fend off the investigation until 2016 when it began. In May of that year, he was reported to have breached ethics rules on at least three occasions, with travel and subsistence claims for being at events held at the same time but hundreds of kilometres from each other. Ó Domhnaill claimed that in these instances he had left one event and travelled across the country to attend another event only to later return to the first event. However, this was not reflected in Ó Domhnaill's expenses forms. Ó Domhnaill's habit of submitting his expenses claims many months (and, at times, longer) after incurring them was also noted.

In December 2016, Ó Domhnaill resigned from the Fianna Fáil party after he was found to have breached ethics legislation.

=== Court case ===
Ó Domhnaill's barrister told a Falcarragh District Court judge on 16 June 2021 that Ó Domhnaill, living in Quebec as of 2021, would likely plead guilty to charges of drunk driving, hit and run, and leaving an accident at Tullygay, Letterkenny, on 2 September 2013.

On 10 September 2021, after fighting the case for eight years, Ó Domhnaill pleaded guilty to drink driving. He was banned from driving for three years and fined €250.
