= Barry O'Neill =

Irish sports broadcaster

Donegal County Councillor
- In office 2004–2019
- Constituency: Donegal

Personal details
- Born: County Donegal, Ireland
- Party: Fine Gael
- Occupation: Broadcaster, producer, politician
- Presenting career
- Station(s): RTÉ Radio 1, RTÉ 2FM
- Network: Raidió Teilifís Éireann (RTÉ)

Barry O'Neill is an Irish sports broadcaster, producer and a retired politician from County Donegal.

== Career ==
He is a producer with Sunday Sport on RTÉ Radio 1. He regularly presents bulletins on RTÉ Radio 1 and RTÉ 2fm. He was elected to Donegal County Council in 2004, 2009, and 2014, before retiring in 2019. He also ran for the party in the 2010 Donegal South-West by-election finishing second behind the winner Pearse Doherty.

Because of his involvement with both RTÉ and Fine Gael he has drawn comparisons with George Lee. Also, citing a significant journalistic ethics conflict.

== Awards ==
O'Neill, through his work with RTE, has won a PPI National Award for best sports story in 2014, and a gold IMRO National Award for best sports programme with in 2018.

== Controversy ==
In 2012 O'Neill attracted controversy after an image was posted online of him doing a Nazi salute beside a waxwork of Adolf Hitler in a museum in Rome. The Jewish Representative Council in Ireland demanded an apology from O'Neill for the incident.

== Personal life ==
He is a fan of the Donegal football team and Finn Harps and enjoys music by Rory Gallagher.
