= Frank McBrearty Snr =

Irish businessman

Frank McBrearty Snr is an Irish businessman who was the victim of police harassment following the death of Richie Barron. He was awarded nearly €2.5 million in compensation by the Irish High Court. Part of the Morris Tribunal investigated the behaviour of members of the Garda Síochána in this case.

Originally from Raphoe, County Donegal, he served with the Irish Army in the United Nations Operation in the Congo as a young man. He then owned a business in Scotland before returning to his hometown in 1978 to run a pub. His business was popular, drawing business from outside Co. Donegal.

In October 1996, the body of local man Richie Barron was found on a road outside the town. Initially his death was treated as a hit and run, but it was upgraded quickly to a murder enquiry. McBrearty's son, Frank McBrearty Jnr, and a nephew, Mark McConnell, were treated by the Gardaí as suspects. McBrearty Snr was also arrested, spending 14 days in Garda custody.

The tribunal found that his son and nephew were found to have been wrongly considered murder suspects by the Gardaí.

His son Frank McBrearty Jnr is an independent member of Donegal County Council.
