= Mary Coughlan (politician) =

Irish former politician (born 1965)

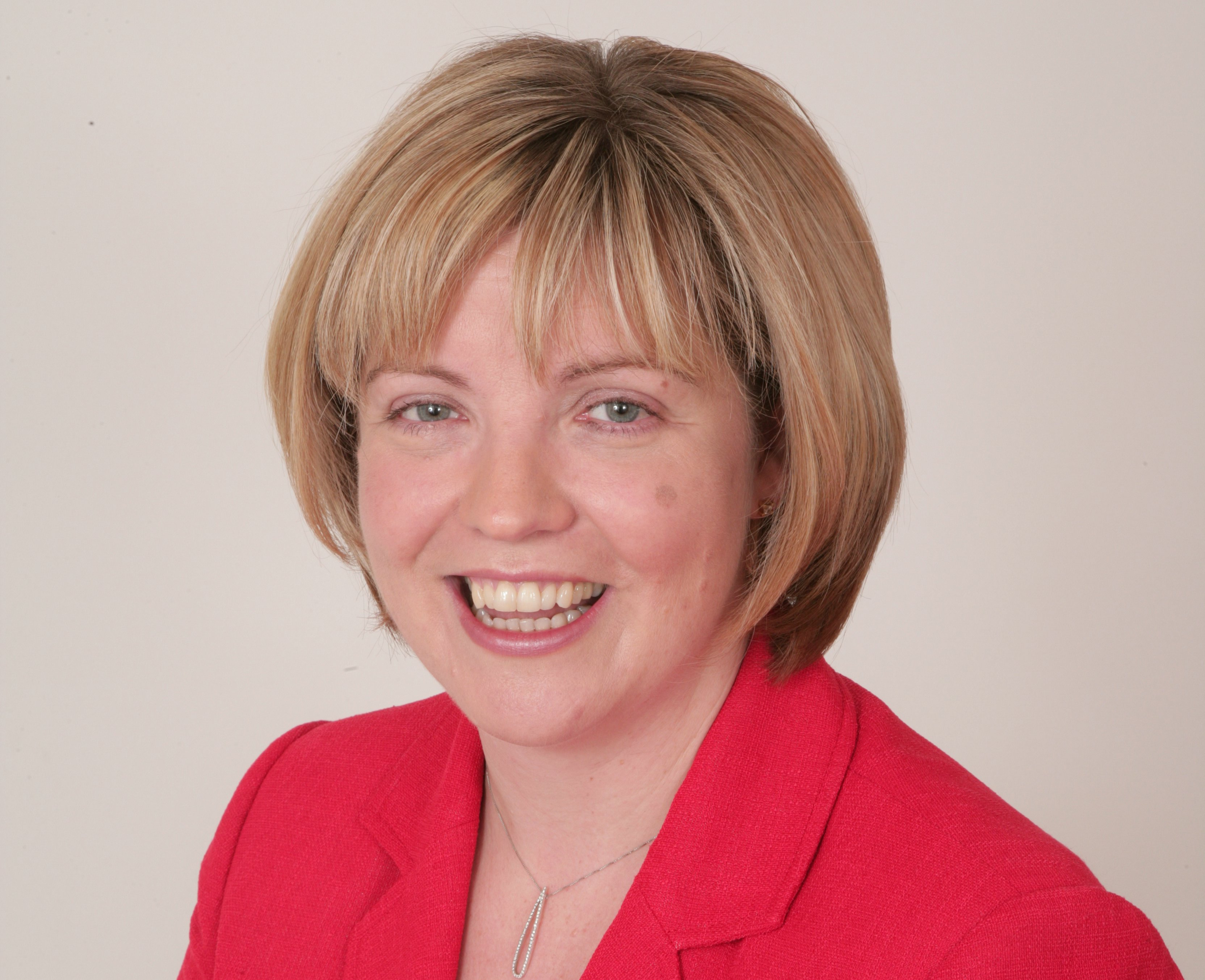

Tánaiste
- In office 7 May 2008 – 9 March 2011
- Taoiseach: Brian Cowen
- Preceded by: Brian Cowen
- Succeeded by: Eamon Gilmore

Deputy leader of Fianna Fáil
- In office 7 May 2008 – 31 January 2011
- Leader: Brian Cowen; Micheál Martin
- Preceded by: Brian Cowen
- Succeeded by: Mary Hanafin

Minister for Health and Children
- In office 20 January 2011 – 9 March 2011
- Taoiseach: Brian Cowen
- Preceded by: Mary Harney
- Succeeded by: James Reilly (Health); Frances Fitzgerald (Children)

Minister for Education and Skills
- In office 23 March 2010 – 9 March 2011
- Taoiseach: Brian Cowen
- Preceded by: Batt O'Keeffe (Education and Science)
- Succeeded by: Ruairi Quinn

Minister for Enterprise, Trade and Employment
- In office 7 May 2008 – 23 March 2010
- Taoiseach: Brian Cowen
- Preceded by: Micheál Martin
- Succeeded by: Batt O'Keeffe (Enterprise, Trade and Innovation)

Minister for Agriculture, Fisheries and Food
- In office 29 September 2004 – 7 May 2008
- Taoiseach: Bertie Ahern
- Preceded by: Joe Walsh (Agriculture and Food)
- Succeeded by: Brendan Smith

Minister for Social and Family Affairs
- In office 17 June 2002 – 29 September 2004
- Taoiseach: Bertie Ahern
- Preceded by: Dermot Ahern (Social, Community and Family Affairs)
- Succeeded by: Séamus Brennan

Minister of State
- 2001–2002: Arts, Heritage, Gaeltacht and the Islands

Teachta Dála
- In office February 1987 – February 2011
- Constituency: Donegal South-West

Personal details
- Born: 28 May 1965 (age 61) Donegal, Ireland
- Party: Fianna Fáil
- Spouse: David Charlton (m. 1995; died 2012)
- Children: 2
- Parent: Cathal Coughlan (father)
- Relatives: Clement Coughlan (uncle)
- Education: University College Dublin

Mary Coughlan (born 28 May 1965) is an Irish former Fianna Fáil politician who served as Tánaiste from 2008 to 2011, Deputy leader of Fianna Fáil from 2008 to 2011, Minister for Health and Children from January 2011 to March 2011, Minister for Education and Skills from 2010 to 2011, Minister for Enterprise, Trade and Employment from 2008 to 2010, Minister for Agriculture, Fisheries, and Food from 2004 to 2008, Minister for Social and Family Affairs from 2002 to 2004 and Minister of State for the Gaeltacht and the Islands from 2001 to 2002. She served as a Teachta Dála (TD) for the Donegal South-West constituency from 1987 to 2011.

== Early life ==
Coughlan was born in Donegal Town in the south of County Donegal in May 1965. Her father was Cathal Coughlan, a Fianna Fáil TD, who died in office in June 1986. She was educated at Ballydevitt National School, on the outskirts of Donegal Town, the Ursuline College in Sligo, where she was a boarder from 1978 to 1983; and later at University College Dublin (UCD), graduating with a Social Science degree. She worked as a social worker for a brief period before becoming involved in politics.

== Political career ==
=== Early political life ===
Coming from a political family, Coughlan was always interested in politics and joined a Fianna Fáil cumann (a local party branch) at the age of 16. Her uncle Clement Coughlan was a TD from 1980 until his death in 1983 in a road traffic accident, while her father Cathal Coughlan was a TD from 1983 to 1986 when he died after a short illness. Following the death of her father, Coughlan was co-opted onto Donegal County Council in 1986, which launched her political career. She was first elected to Dáil Éireann at the 1987 general election as a Fianna Fáil TD for Donegal South-West. At the age of 21 years and nine months, Coughlan was the youngest member of the 25th Dáil.

She remained on the backbenches of the Dáil for the first thirteen years of her career as a TD, before being appointed a junior minister. During this period she served on several Oireachtas committees, including the Joint Committee on Tourism, Sport and Recreation and the Joint Committee on the Irish language where she served as chairperson. Coughlan was also a member of the British-Irish Parliamentary Body. In 1994, Bertie Ahern became leader of Fianna Fáil and Leader of the Opposition. In early 1995 he named his new front bench, including Coughlan as spokesperson on educational reform. She was not included in the cabinet or junior ministerial team when the party came to office in 1997.

=== Minister of State ===
In February 2001, Coughlan was appointed as Minister of State at the Department of Arts, Heritage, Gaeltacht and the Islands, with responsibility for the Gaeltacht and Islands. In this role for just sixteen months, she was responsible for securing Government approval for the general scheme of the Official Languages Equality Bill, which aimed to confirm the language rights of citizens and outline their rights when dealing with the State in either official language. She also oversaw an amended Gaeltacht Housing Act, updating the supports available for Irish-speaking households building in or moving to the Gaeltacht. The Commission on Irish in the Gaeltacht (Comisiún na Gaeltachta) also completed its work under her guidance and Coughlan saw its report approved and published. During her time in this role, she also established a Working Group on the Creation of Employment in the Gaeltacht. Coughlan oversaw significant investment in island infrastructure and the connection of islands to the national electricity grid, including Inishbofin Island, off the County Donegal coast, which was connected for the first time in 2002 by using an underwater cable from the mainland.

=== Cabinet career (2002–2011) ===
==== Minister for Social and Family Affairs (2002–2004) ====
After the 2002 general election Coughlan was promoted to the cabinet as Minister for Social and Family Affairs. Her time in Social and Family Affairs saw increases in social welfare payments and the extension of family support. She established the Family Support Agency with a mandate to support families, promote stability in family life, prevent marital breakdown and foster a supportive community environment for families at a local level.

Coughlan received criticism for changes she made regarding the availability of rent supplements. This was portrayed as targeting the weaker sections of society at a time when the Irish economy was reasonably strong. She was also widely criticised for cuts she made as Minister to entitlements for widows and widowers after the death of a spouse. The cuts were part of a wider drive for a reduction in government spending in the autumn of 2002. However, many considered these and other similar cutbacks to have been forced upon her by Charlie McCreevy, who was Minister for Finance at the time, and who was blamed for many of his decisions. She was also involved in resolving a dispute over payments with the country's dentists.

During her time as Minister for Social and Family Affairs, Coughlan was praised for introducing large increases in child benefits and pensions. Her work on the pensions element of her portfolio also saw her introduce Personal Retirement Savings Accounts. Coughlan also established the Office of the Pensions Ombudsman and provided additional funding and support for the State's Money Advice and Budgeting Service (MABS).

==== Minister for Agriculture, Fisheries and Food (2004–2008) ====
In a 2004 reshuffle, Coughlan succeeded Joe Walsh as Minister for Agriculture and Food, becoming the first woman to hold that portfolio in the Republic of Ireland (her fellow Donegal woman, Bríd Rodgers, had become the first woman to be appointed as a full-ranking Agriculture Minister in Ireland when she had been appointed Minister for Agriculture and Rural Development in the Northern Ireland Executive in December 1999, serving until October 2002).

During her time in this role the country's last two remaining sugar factories, owned by Greencore, were closed. The Carlow factory closed on 11 March 2005. Mallow, Ireland's last sugar factory to remain open, closed on 12 May 2006, after operating for 77 years. Farmers and others were critical of the decision. They criticised the government's and the Minister's roles, both were seen as not doing enough to try to stop the closures, though they had retained some control over the factories since they had been privatised several years before. As sugar beet growers now had nowhere to sell their sugar beet, cultivation of the crop ceased in Ireland. Coughlan also headed this department at a time when the spread of bird flu from abroad looked very likely to occur, especially in 2006.

Coughlan was re-appointed to the portfolio on 14 June 2007 following the 2007 general election, with the additional responsibility of fisheries as Minister for Agriculture, Fisheries and Food. Shortly after her re-appointment Coughlan had to put in place measures to deal with the threat of the potential spread of foot-and-mouth disease from Great Britain in early August 2007.

Throughout her time in this ministry, Coughlan was involved in ongoing WTO trade talks. During these trade talks, in which Irish agriculture was threatened by attacks on EU farm subsidies and free access to EU markets, she allied with French ministers to resist the proposals.

==== Tánaiste and Minister for Enterprise, Trade and Employment (2008–2010) ====
Following Bertie Ahern's resignation on 6 May 2008, Coughlan, in a cabinet re-shuffle, became Tánaiste and Minister for Enterprise, Trade and Employment on 7 May 2008, by newly appointed Taoiseach Brian Cowen.

As a proponent of the Treaty of Lisbon, Coughlan was noted to have "quietly withdrawn" from the first referendum campaign after she embarrassed the Government in a radio interview by not knowing the number of European Commissioners. Over a period of four days Coughlan stated that the EU's larger nations still had two Commissioners each. In fact, the bigger states had lost their second places on the Commission in 2004. According to an editorial in The Irish Times, "how someone who had spent several years around an EU Council of Ministers' table could not know that is extraordinary".

Responding to a row over medical cards she displayed insufficient mathematical skill, saying "Of the savings of €100 million, €86 million is for GPs and €30 million is for pharmacists".

Her performance as Tánaiste in defence of the October 2008 budget was criticised by opposition politicians and the media, with Fine Gael's Leo Varadkar publicly comparing Coughlan to gaffe-prone Alaskan Governor Sarah Palin. Varadkar's comments were challenged by broadcaster John Bowman and Sunday Tribune journalist Justine McCarthy, as well as by Coughlan herself.

Coughlan announced a third change in the budgetary position, in her local constituency, before cabinet agreement and five days before the responsible Minister for Social and Family Affairs announced it to the nation, via RTÉ Radio.

Coughlan acted to clean up years of wasteful spending by executives at FÁS, the state training and employment agency, and was considered to have taken a tough line with Director General, Rody Molloy, who was forced to resign in November 2008.

The 2008 fall in the value of sterling against the euro saw the price gap between North and South widen and shoppers cross to Northern Ireland to the perceived detriment of businesses within the Republic of Ireland. Coughlan asked multiple retailers within the Republic to reduce their margins and provide better value to consumers in the Republic. Research from Forfás, concluded that only a five per cent difference in the cost of goods between North and South was justifiable. The findings highlighted retailers' larger margins in the Republic about their operations in the North, and Coughlan queried why the price differential in many identical goods was substantially more than 5%. Coughlan said: "I don't own a shop. The Government doesn't own a shop. It's up to Tesco, it's up to Superquinn, it's up to Aldi, it's up to Lidl; it's up to them to cut their prices. They need to ensure that that happens; they have to do something about it." When retailers continued to remain silent on the price differential, Coughlan sent in the Competition Authority to investigate supply chains in the retail sector.

Coughlan was condemned for doing "too little too late" in relation to large-scale loss of employment at a Dell facility in Limerick, despite successfully retaining 2,000 Dell employees in Ireland. She also successfully secured over €22 million of European Globalisation Adjustment Fund money to the benefit of the workers made redundant in Limerick.

Coughlan was accused by an opposition spokesperson of being unable to debate exchequer figures.

Coughlan acted to close loopholes in company law that made it possible for bank directors not to have to disclose the full extent of their indebtedness to the bank in its published accounts. She also strengthened the powers of the Director of Corporate Enforcement to enforce company law provisions.

On 24 April 2009, one of Coughlan's demoted junior ministers, John McGuinness, criticised Coughlan and Cowen for the lack of leadership being given to the country, saying: "She's not equipped to deal with the complex issues of dealing with enterprise and business within the department. And neither is the department". McGuinness' credibility was subsequently undermined when it was revealed that he had hired external PR advice in an effort to undermine Coughlan and enhance his own profile as a Minister of State within her department.

In April 2009, she denied there would be a supplementary budget – one was announced five days later – also claiming that the public finances were under control at the same time.

In September that year Coughlan was described as Calamity Coughlan, having been left red-faced after erroneously referring to the theory of evolution as having been formulated by Einstein. Later that month she apparently let slip the date of a general election while speaking about the budget when Brian Cowen was in New York. She also called her Green Party colleagues "na glasraí" – Irish language for "the vegetables".

==== Minister for Education and Skills (2010–2011) ====
On 23 March 2010, as part of a cabinet reshuffle, she was appointed as Minister for Education and Skills, while retaining the position of Tánaiste. One of Coughlan's first initiatives in the portfolio was to voice her support for the introduction of a CAO points bonus for students studying higher level maths. She revamped the Student Maintenance Grant application procedure, streamlining administration and getting the scheme out two months earlier than in previous years. Following the resignation of Mary Harney in January 2011, Coughlan was also appointed as Minister for Health and Children.

=== Loss of seat ===
At the 2011 general election, Coughlan lost her seat to Independent candidate Thomas Pringle. Her first preference vote more than halved from 26.5% in 2007 to just over 11%. Her running mate Brian Ó Domhnaill also failed to be elected, leaving Donegal South-West without a Fianna Fáil TD for the first time in its history. The loss of her seat was considered the most high-profile casualty of the Fianna Fáil meltdown. The Guardian newspaper described it as "Ireland's Portillo moment". Coughlan received a lump sum of €237,000, and an annual pension of €140,000. In 2022, Coughlan stepped back into public life when she was appointed Chair of the National Conference on Women in Farming by her successor as Donegal Fianna Fáil TD, the Minister for Agriculture, Charlie McConalogue.

== Views on LGBT rights ==
During her time as Minister for Social and Family Affairs, Coughlan became involved in several LGBT rights controversies. In March 2004, she introduced the Social Welfare Amendment Act 2004 in response to a case involving same-sex partner benefits. Under the Equal Status Act 2000, a gay pensioner successfully petitioned the Equality Authority to allow his male partner to travel as his 'spouse' using the pensioner's travel pass. The legislation which Coughlan subsequently produced limited the meaning of the word 'spouse' to include only married couples; this was regarded by the Opposition parties and LGBT rights campaigners as discriminatory towards same-sex couples as there had been no legal recognition of same-sex unions in the Republic of Ireland at the time. Two months later, Coughlan caused comment at a European Union conference on family and social policy by stating that Ireland would never be ready for same-sex marriage or gay adoption.

During her time in Social and Family Affairs, Coughlan produced a report discussing new definitions of 'the family' which recommended a more progressive approach to the matter. This influenced the government's 2008 civil union legislation.

== Personal life ==
Coughlan is a fluent Irish speaker.

In 1991 Coughlan married David Charlton, a Garda Síochána officer who was working at Leinster House. Several years after their marriage, Charlton was seriously injured in a car accident, losing his leg. The couple have two children - a son and a daughter. They lived at Frosses, a village just west of Donegal town. Charlton died from cancer on 2 September 2012.

Coughlan served as secretary of the St Naul's GAA club.

Political offices
Preceded by Éamon Ó Cuív	Minister of State at the Department of Arts, Heritage, Gaeltacht and the Islands; 2001–2002	Succeeded by Noel Ahern as Minister of State at the Department of Community, Rural and Gaeltacht Affairs
Preceded by Dermot Ahern as Minister for Social, Community and Family Affairs	Minister for Social and Family Affairs; 2002–2004	Succeeded by Séamus Brennan
Preceded by Joe Walsh as Minister for Agriculture and Food	Minister for Agriculture, Fisheries and Food; 2004–2008	Succeeded by Brendan Smith
Preceded by Brian Cowen	Tánaiste; 2008–2011	Succeeded by Eamon Gilmore
Preceded by Micheál Martin	Minister for Enterprise, Trade and Employment; 2008–2010	Succeeded by Batt O'Keeffe as Minister for Enterprise, Trade and Innovation
Preceded by Batt O'Keeffe as Minister for Education and Science	Minister for Education and Skills; 2010–2011	Succeeded by Ruairi Quinn
Preceded by Mary Harney	Minister for Health and Children; 2011	Succeeded by James Reilly as Minister for Health
Party political offices
Preceded by Brian Cowen	Deputy leader of Fianna Fáil; 2008–2011	Succeeded by Mary Hanafin
Honorary titles
Preceded by Brian Cowen	Baby of the Dáil; 1987–1995	Succeeded by Mildred Fox

Dáil	Election	Deputy (Party)	Deputy (Party)	Deputy (Party)
17th	1961	Joseph Brennan (FF)	Cormac Breslin (FF)	Patrick O'Donnell (FG)
18th	1965	Joseph Brennan (FF)	Cormac Breslin (FF)	Patrick O'Donnell (FG)
19th	1969	Constituency abolished. See Donegal–Leitrim		

Dáil	Election	Deputy (Party)	Deputy (Party)	Deputy (Party)
22nd	1981	Pat "the Cope" Gallagher (FF)	Clement Coughlan (FF)	James White (FG)
23rd	1982 (Feb)	Pat "the Cope" Gallagher (FF)	Clement Coughlan (FF)	Dinny McGinley (FG)
24th	1982 (Nov)	Pat "the Cope" Gallagher (FF)	Clement Coughlan (FF)	Dinny McGinley (FG)
24th	1983 by-election	Pat "the Cope" Gallagher (FF)	Cathal Coughlan (FF)	Dinny McGinley (FG)
25th	1987	Pat "the Cope" Gallagher (FF)	Mary Coughlan (FF)	Dinny McGinley (FG)
26th	1989	Pat "the Cope" Gallagher (FF)	Mary Coughlan (FF)	Dinny McGinley (FG)
27th	1992	Pat "the Cope" Gallagher (FF)	Mary Coughlan (FF)	Dinny McGinley (FG)
28th	1997	Tom Gildea (Ind.)	Mary Coughlan (FF)	Dinny McGinley (FG)
29th	2002	Pat "the Cope" Gallagher (FF)	Mary Coughlan (FF)	Dinny McGinley (FG)
30th	2007	Pat "the Cope" Gallagher (FF)	Mary Coughlan (FF)	Dinny McGinley (FG)
30th	2010 by-election	Pearse Doherty (SF)	Mary Coughlan (FF)	Dinny McGinley (FG)
31st	2011	Pearse Doherty (SF)	Thomas Pringle (Ind.)	Dinny McGinley (FG)
32nd	2016	Constituency abolished. See Donegal		
