= Thomas Pringle (politician) =

Irish politician (born 1967)

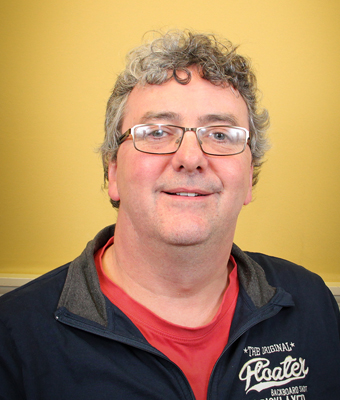
- Pringle in 2016

Teachta Dála
- In office February 2016 – November 2024
- Constituency: Donegal
- In office February 2011 – February 2016
- Constituency: Donegal South-West

Personal details
- Born: 30 August 1967 (age 58) Dublin, Ireland
- Party: Independent
- Other political affiliations: Sinn Féin (2004–2007)
- Education: Letterkenny Institute of Technology; GMIT
- Website: thomaspringle.ie

Thomas Pringle (born 30 August 1967) is an Irish independent politician who served as a Teachta Dála (TD) for the Donegal constituency from 2016 to 2024, and previously from 2011 to 2016 for the Donegal South-West constituency.

== Early life ==
Pringle was born into an Irish republican family. His father, Peter, was a supporter of the Irish Republican Socialist Party (IRSP), and was wrongfully convicted of the killing of two members of the Gardaí in 1980, a conviction that was subsequently declared as unsafe, although it has not been certified as a miscarriage of justice. He is a patron of the People's Movement, which campaigned against the Lisbon Treaty. He previously worked for Donegal County Council, where he managed a water treatment plant and was a shop steward. Pringle is married and has three children.

== Donegal County Council (1999-2011) ==
Pringle was previously a member of Donegal County Council, having been elected as an independent member in 1999, and then as a Sinn Féin candidate in 2004. He left Sinn Féin in 2007, and retained his seat as an independent in 2009.

=== Electoral results ===
Elections to Donegal County Council
Party	Election		FPv	FPv%	Result
Independent	Donegal LEA	1999	954	7.2	Elected on count 11/11
Sinn Féin	Donegal LEA	2004	2,334	16.6	Elected on count 1/9
Independent	Donegal LEA	2009	1,501	10.0	Elected on count 8/10

== Dáil Éireann (2011–2024) ==
Pringle was elected as a TD for the Donegal South-West constituency at the 2011 general election, unseating the incumbent Tánaiste Mary Coughlan. He quickly became an ally of Luke 'Ming' Flanagan, elected as an independent TD at the same time as Pringle, but for the Roscommon–South Leitrim constituency. Flanagan and Pringle would go on to support each other on many issues, including reform of the Common Agricultural Policy (CAP) and opposition to the MERCOSUR deal. Even when Flanagan was elected as an MEP for the Midlands–North-West constituency after spending three years in the Dáil, himself and Pringle continued to work together, and Flanagan visited Donegal to canvass for Pringle ahead of the 2020 general election.

On 5 December 2011, Pringle delivered a televised address to the nation, representing the technical group of TDs in Dáil Éireann. He did so in response to Taoiseach Enda Kenny's Address to the nation of the previous evening. Later that month, Pringle called on people for support in a campaign not to pay a new household charge brought in as part of the latest austerity budget, and announced that he would not register for the tax or pay it.

In February 2012, he published his expenses online. He was elected leader of the Technical group in Dáil Éireann in March 2012.

In May 2012, Pringle brought an unsuccessful High Court challenge over the 2012 European Fiscal Compact referendum and the ESM Treaty which was appealed to the Supreme Court in July 2012. In July 2012, the Irish Supreme Court decided to refer three questions to the Court of Justice of the European Union arising out of his challenge of the European Stability Mechanism Treaty and doubts about the ESM's legality under the Treaties of the European Union. The CJEU held an oral hearing on the referral on 23 October 2012. It was the first time that the full court sat to hear a reference from a member state of the Union. The 27 judges heard oral arguments from the counsel for Pringle, Ireland, nine other member states, the Commission, the Council, and the European Parliament. On 27 November 2012, the EU Court of Justice dismissed of Pringle's arguments and ruled that the ESM was in accordance with the Treaties.

At the 2016 general election, after a re-drawing of constituency boundaries, Pringle campaigned in the new five-seater Donegal constituency. He was re-elected to the final seat by 184 votes over Sinn Féin's Pádraig Mac Lochlainn. During negotiations to form a government, Pringle said he was glad not to have signed up to the Independent Alliance, after that group entered talks with Taoiseach Enda Kenny. Pringle said that unless Kenny or Fianna Fáil leader Micheál Martin signed up to Right2Change, he would not support either as Taoiseach.

As of April 2016, Pringle had become a member of the Independents 4 Change technical group in the Dáil.

In May 2016, Pringle introduced legislation designed to retain water in public ownership and avoid further privatisation.

Pringle put forward a bill calling on the government to end public spending from fossil fuels, which passed, making Ireland the first country to fully divest public money from fossil fuels. In June 2022, Pringle put forward a bill proposing a referendum on lowering the voting age to 16.

He was defeated at the 2024 general election, following Fianna Fáil's Charlie McConalogue overtaking Pringle on transfers for the last seat.

=== Electoral results ===
Elections to the Dáil
Party	Election		FPv	FPv%	Result
Independent	Donegal South-West	2002	2,630	7.4	Eliminated on count 4/8
Independent	Donegal South-West	2010 by-election	3,438	9.9	Eliminated on count 3/4
Independent	Donegal South-West	2011	5,845	13.5	Elected on count 5/5
Independent	Donegal	2016	6,220	8.5	Elected on count 13/13
Independent	Donegal	2020	5,472	7.1	Elected on count 9/9
Independent	Donegal	2024	5,289	6.9	Eliminated on count 16/16

Dáil	Election	Deputy (Party)	Deputy (Party)	Deputy (Party)
17th	1961	Joseph Brennan (FF)	Cormac Breslin (FF)	Patrick O'Donnell (FG)
18th	1965	Joseph Brennan (FF)	Cormac Breslin (FF)	Patrick O'Donnell (FG)
19th	1969	Constituency abolished. See Donegal–Leitrim		

Dáil	Election	Deputy (Party)	Deputy (Party)	Deputy (Party)
22nd	1981	Pat "the Cope" Gallagher (FF)	Clement Coughlan (FF)	James White (FG)
23rd	1982 (Feb)	Pat "the Cope" Gallagher (FF)	Clement Coughlan (FF)	Dinny McGinley (FG)
24th	1982 (Nov)	Pat "the Cope" Gallagher (FF)	Clement Coughlan (FF)	Dinny McGinley (FG)
24th	1983 by-election	Pat "the Cope" Gallagher (FF)	Cathal Coughlan (FF)	Dinny McGinley (FG)
25th	1987	Pat "the Cope" Gallagher (FF)	Mary Coughlan (FF)	Dinny McGinley (FG)
26th	1989	Pat "the Cope" Gallagher (FF)	Mary Coughlan (FF)	Dinny McGinley (FG)
27th	1992	Pat "the Cope" Gallagher (FF)	Mary Coughlan (FF)	Dinny McGinley (FG)
28th	1997	Tom Gildea (Ind.)	Mary Coughlan (FF)	Dinny McGinley (FG)
29th	2002	Pat "the Cope" Gallagher (FF)	Mary Coughlan (FF)	Dinny McGinley (FG)
30th	2007	Pat "the Cope" Gallagher (FF)	Mary Coughlan (FF)	Dinny McGinley (FG)
30th	2010 by-election	Pearse Doherty (SF)	Mary Coughlan (FF)	Dinny McGinley (FG)
31st	2011	Pearse Doherty (SF)	Thomas Pringle (Ind.)	Dinny McGinley (FG)
32nd	2016	Constituency abolished. See Donegal		

Dáil	Election	Deputy (Party)	Deputy (Party)	Deputy (Party)	Deputy (Party)	Deputy (Party)	Deputy (Party)	Deputy (Party)	Deputy (Party)
2nd	1921	Joseph O'Doherty (SF)	Samuel O'Flaherty (SF)	Patrick McGoldrick (SF)	Joseph McGinley (SF)	Joseph Sweeney (SF)	Peter Ward (SF)	6 seats 1921–1923	
3rd	1922	Joseph O'Doherty (AT-SF)	Samuel O'Flaherty (AT-SF)	Patrick McGoldrick (PT-SF)	Joseph McGinley (PT-SF)	Joseph Sweeney (PT-SF)	Peter Ward (PT-SF)	6 seats 1921–1923	
4th	1923	Joseph O'Doherty (Rep)	Peadar O'Donnell (Rep)	Patrick McGoldrick (CnaG)	Eugene Doherty (CnaG)	Patrick McFadden (CnaG)	Peter Ward (CnaG)	James Myles (Ind.)	John White (FP)
4th	1924 by-election	Joseph O'Doherty (Rep)	Peadar O'Donnell (Rep)	Patrick McGoldrick (CnaG)	Eugene Doherty (CnaG)	Patrick McFadden (CnaG)	Denis McCullough (CnaG)	James Myles (Ind.)	John White (FP)
5th	1927 (Jun)	Frank Carney (FF)	Neal Blaney (FF)	Daniel McMenamin (NL)	Eugene Doherty (CnaG)	Michael Óg McFadden (CnaG)	Hugh Law (CnaG)	James Myles (Ind.)	John White (FP)
6th	1927 (Sep)	Frank Carney (FF)	Neal Blaney (FF)	Archie Cassidy (Lab)	Eugene Doherty (CnaG)	Michael Óg McFadden (CnaG)	Hugh Law (CnaG)	James Myles (Ind.)	John White (FP)
7th	1932	Frank Carney (FF)	Neal Blaney (FF)	Brian Brady (FF)	Eugene Doherty (CnaG)	Daniel McMenamin (CnaG)	James Dillon (Ind.)	James Myles (Ind.)	John White (CnaG)
8th	1933	Joseph O'Doherty (FF)	Neal Blaney (FF)	Brian Brady (FF)	Hugh Doherty (FF)	Daniel McMenamin (CnaG)	James Dillon (NCP)	James Myles (Ind.)	Michael Óg McFadden (CnaG)
9th	1937	Constituency abolished. See Donegal East and Donegal West							

Dáil	Election	Deputy (Party)	Deputy (Party)	Deputy (Party)	Deputy (Party)	Deputy (Party)
21st	1977	Hugh Conaghan (FF)	Joseph Brennan (FF)	Neil Blaney (IFF)	James White (FG)	Paddy Harte (FG)
21st	1980 by-election	Hugh Conaghan (FF)	Clement Coughlan (FF)	Neil Blaney (IFF)	James White (FG)	Paddy Harte (FG)
22nd	1981	Constituency abolished. See Donegal North-East and Donegal South-West				

Dáil	Election	Deputy (Party)	Deputy (Party)	Deputy (Party)	Deputy (Party)	Deputy (Party)
32nd	2016	Pearse Doherty (SF)	Pat "the Cope" Gallagher (FF)	Thomas Pringle (Ind.)	Charlie McConalogue (FF)	Joe McHugh (FG)
33rd	2020	Pearse Doherty (SF)	Pádraig Mac Lochlainn (SF)	Thomas Pringle (Ind.)	Charlie McConalogue (FF)	Joe McHugh (FG)
34th	2024	Pearse Doherty (SF)	Pádraig Mac Lochlainn (SF)	Charles Ward (100%R)	Charlie McConalogue (FF)	Pat "the Cope" Gallagher (FF)
