= Morris Tribunal =

Public inquiry

The Morris Tribunal was a public inquiry to address allegations of the 1990s and early 2000s against the Garda Síochána, the national police force of Ireland. Subjects explored included suggestions of corrupt and dishonest policing in County Donegal but its recommendations and conclusions have more widespread consequences and importance.

The Morris Tribunal was created by a resolution of the Oireachtas on 28 March 2002 and by Instrument entitled Tribunals of Inquiry (Evidence) Act, 1921 (Establishment of Tribunal) Instrument, 2002 made by the Minister for Justice, Equality and Law Reform on 24 April 2002.

Its formal title was The Tribunal of Inquiry into complaints concerning some Gardaí of the Donegal Division. It is known as the Morris Tribunal after its chairman and sole member, Justice Frederick Morris, a former president of the Irish High Court and a judge of the Special Criminal Court.

The tribunal concluded its public hearings in December 2007. Its final report was issued in October 2008.

== Background ==
The Morris Tribunal takes place against probably the most over-reaching reform of the Gardaí in its history, the Garda Síochána Act 2005, which established the Garda Ombudsman Commission and other strategic initiatives. So far, it has resulted in the resignations of several senior officers in the force, including one Chief Superintendent and three Superintendents, after they were criticised for negligence, as well as the firing of another Superintendent found to be corrupt. Several other present and former officers of various ranks have been criticised for negligence, found to have lied, or been found to have acted corruptly.

== Modules ==
Evidence in all modules in the tribunal's terms of reference were heard. All reports were published by October 2008.

The first substantive report was published in 2004; the second in 2005 and reports three, four and five were published in August 2006.

The remaining reports covered an investigation into the interrogation of 12 suspects in Garda custody detained in connection with the death of Richard Barron; allegations that interview rooms in Garda stations were bugged; anonymous allegations of Garda corruption at the highest level; allegations of a campaign of Garda harassment directed against the extended McBrearty family, their employees and others in Co Donegal; and the effectiveness of the Garda Complaints Board in dealing with complaints from the extended family and others.

=== Report 1 Faked Explosives Discovery ===
The first report, in June 2004, concerned allegations that two Donegal-based detectives, Superintendent Kevin Lennon and Detective Garda Noel McMahon, faked a series of explosives finds in the border county in 1993 and 1994.

Findings of culpability in respect of individual members of the Garda Síochána were made. The extent of culpability ranged from instances of negligence to, in the cases of Superintendent Lennon and Detective Garda McMahon, corruptly orchestrating the planting of ammunition and hoax explosives.

Chief Supt Denis Fitzpatrick, who was cited as being "gravely at fault" in not investigating the activities Lennon and McMahon relating to implicating a person as IRA informer, took early retirement from the Garda in July 2004. Lennon, who was suspended on full pay in August 2002 on foot of the Frank Shortt* affair and was fired from the Garda in October 2004. McMahon resigned from the force before the Garda Commissioner could dismiss him from the force. (* Frank Shortt, a Donegal publican, was adjudged to have been wrongly convicted by "perjured Garda evidence" following "a conspiracy to concoct false evidence" by McMahon and Lennon.)

The report also makes general recommendations arising from its findings, including the need for a more proactive role for Garda Headquarters in the management of Garda Divisions, the need for improved recording and reporting of incidents, the immediate restoration of the discontinued practice of members of Inspector rank and above keeping daily official journals, the need for an urgent review of policy in relation to the handling of informants, and the need for a specific obligation on members of the Garda Síochána to account truthfully for any actions taken in the course of duty, with failure to account constituting a serious breach of discipline warranting dismissal. While it makes no specific recommendation on the matter, the report also questions the adequacy of the Garda promotion system in identifying and advancing persons with the necessary aptitude and skills, and calls for the system to be reviewed. Significant changes had already commenced as part of the Garda reform process.

=== Report 2 Richard Barron ===
The second report in June 2005 concerned the Barron Investigation module, which looked at events following the hit-and-run death on 14 October 1996 of cattle dealer Richie Barron, which police mistakenly treated as a murder inquiry; and hoax extortion calls received by Michael and Charlotte Peoples on 9 November 1996.

The second report exposed further evidence of lies, malice, and incompetence among the force in Donegal. The Tribunal chairman described the investigation into the death of cattle dealer Richie Barron as "an extraordinary shambles". "There is evidence of willful blunders, gross negligence, laziness, emotionally wrong-headed rushes to judge people as guilty and a determination by some parties to ensure that, even if there was no evidence, that the suspicions formulated were going to stick and stick permanently".

The Garda response was to set up five separate Working Groups to consider:

- A review of the role of Crime & Security Branch (CSB).
- External Professional Assistance
- Training
- Reporting within the Garda Síochána (including reporting to the Department of JELR)
- Professional & Ethical Conduct

=== Report 3 Silver Bullet ===
The third report addresses allegations made by Bernard Conlon that he was acting as an agent of the Garda Síochána with respect to his being found on the nightclub/public house premises of Frank McBrearty Snr in Raphoe on 31 August 1997, and further that in making a complaint that two men arrived at his door late on the evening of 20 June 1998, he was acting as an agent of the Garda Síochána.

The report concludes that a member of the public, Mr Bernard Conlon, was induced by former Detective Sergeant John White (assisted by Garda John Nicholson) with the promise of reward to be found being served alcohol after hours on the licensed premises of Mr Frank McBrearty Snr. The purpose of this was to provide a reliable witness in a prosecution under the licensing laws against Mr McBrearty Snr.

The report also deals with allegations by Mr Conlon that Mr Mark McConnell and Mr Michael Peoples threatened him with a silver bullet because of his forthcoming testimony against Mr McBrearty. The report concludes that the allegations themselves were false.

The report recommends that the use of a person as a Garda agent and witness needs to be subject to strict controls and that urgent consideration has to be given to the formulation of written guidelines to cover this aspect of police work. Arising from earlier Morris reports, the Garda Síochána conducted a full review of existing policy, practices and procedures relating to the handling and management of informants and has put in place a new protocol and policy encompassing best police standards in the management and use of covert human intelligence sources. Covert Human Intelligence Source (CHIS) management is now in place throughout the Force. All aspects of the protocol will now be reviewed by the Garda Authorities.

It also recommends that the Garda disciplinary code needs to be revised and streamlined to be able to deal more efficiently and swiftly with disciplinary issues arising within the Service.

=== Report 4 Ardara ===
This module deals with an arson attack on a telecommunications mast at Alt na gCapall, Ardara, County Donegal and a later explosives device in the same location in November 1996 within the context of a local protest against the addition of an MMDS mast to the site which was then ongoing.

The telecommunications mast was the subject of controversy and protest locally. The Tribunal has concluded that an "explosive device" was caused to be put on the mast by former Sergeant John White for the purpose of using Section 30 of the Offences against the State Acts to arrest some of the protestors, although it could not go so far as to say that he actually placed it there. Mr White is seeking a judicial review of the tribunal's findings.

The report recommends that there needs to be a mechanism in place within the Garda Síochána whereby a serving member can speak in confidence to a designated officer in Garda Headquarters on concerns about misconduct within the Service. Regulations for a Whistleblower's charter within the Garda Síochána have been drawn up and are being finalised in consultation with the Commissioner, the Ombudsman Commission and Garda Inspectorate, as provided for in the Garda Síochána Act 2005.

=== Report 5 Burnfoot ===
This module examined the circumstances surrounding the alleged planting of a firearm 22 May 1998, to effect the arrest and detention of seven persons (members of the traveller community) at Burnfoot, County Donegal at 8:00 AM the following day on foot of search warrants and the investigation relating to this. The finding of such a weapon meant that an arrest under S30 of the Offences Against the State Act 1939 could be justified.

While Detective Sergeant White was acquitted of a criminal charge on 27 July 2006 of possession of a firearm for an unlawful purpose, the Tribunal was satisfied that he planted a shotgun at the Travellers' encampment so as to justify an arrest under Section 30 of the Offences against the State Act. The Tribunal found that he was aided in this by Detective Garda Thomas Kilcoyne. The Tribunal also found that, when Sergeant White was subsequently arrested and charged in relation to this incident, Sergeant Jack Conaty, Garda Martin Leonard, and Garda Patrick Mulligan conspired together to invent a story to acquit Sergeant White.

The Tribunal has concluded that proper discipline has been lost in the Force and the disciplinary machinery has become overlaid with an unnecessary degree of legal formalism. The report acknowledges the proud record of the Garda Síochána, but warns that firm action is required to address the question of indiscipline within the Garda Síochána. It says that firm but fair measures relating to discipline are required to restore morale and, if such action is not taken, the abuses which led to the establishment of the Tribunal will be repeated.

While the issue of indiscipline has been highlighted in previous reports, it is the scale of the problem as found by Judge Morris that comes through most starkly in the Burnfoot report.

The Burnfoot Report also indicates that the Tribunal has been disturbed by the manner in which search warrants under section 29 of the Offences against the State Act are issued by Garda Superintendents. The Tribunal recommends that urgent consideration be given to vesting the power to issue warrants under Section 29 of the Offences against the State Act, 1939, at present vested in officers of the Garda Síochána not below the level of Superintendent, in judges of District Court and Circuit Court. The Tribunal recognises that there are very limited occasions when time would be so pressing as to make it impossible to follow such a procedure and that, in any event, a residual power for such eventuality could potentially still be vested in a senior officer of the Garda Síochána to be used in exceptional circumstances.

== Scathing Criticism of the Garda Síochána ==
Evidence has been examined by the Tribunal from gardaí based both within the Donegal division and members of varying ranks based elsewhere in the country. The Tribunal compliments many individual Gardaí but severely and trenchantly criticises others.

=== Discipline ===
The Tribunal has been staggered by the amount of indiscipline and insubordination it has found in the Garda force. There is a small but disproportionately influential core of mischief-making members who will not obey orders, who will not follow procedures, who will not tell the truth and who have no respect for their officers. Garda Martin Leonard is cited in this regard—applying to arrest a colleague in an investigation in which he was not involved, not wearing his uniform, lying at will, and continually testing the waters as to the vulnerability of his colleagues. The behaviour of three Garda witnesses, Sgt Conaty, Garda Mulligan and Garda Martin Leonard, in all of this beggars belief; and yet it happened in the course of a Tribunal hearing that was much extended by their dissimulation, the Tribunal was used a sounding board for deceit in the hope that it too could be inveigled into believing lies. White stated in a media interviews that the Tribunal findings against him were based on "hearsay, innuendo and rumour" rather than the thousands of documents admitted as evidence and hundreds of days at hearing.

=== Code of Discipline ===
Inquiries relating to Garda discipline can take years to unravel due to the overlay of legal formalism in the process. Procedures can be used to frustrate and delay simple and straightforward investigations. The Tribunal has made recommendations in respect of this. A new draft code of discipline was published by Justice Minister Michael McDowell at the publication of the third, fourth, and fifth reports of the Tribunal, but so far has not been implemented.

=== Management ===
The Tribunal observes that, when trust is absent and management is infirm, damage ensues.

=== Search Warrants ===
The Tribunal recommends that power to issue Section 29 search warrants under the Offences Against the State Act (1939) be vested in a District Court justice to balance the interests of the Gardaí and the constitutional rights of the person to be searched. The Minister for Justice has proposed amendments to allow judicial oversight of warrants issued under emergency powers legislation, but senior officers will still have power to issue warrants in "exceptional circumstances."

== See also ==
- Other public inquiries
- Tribunal
