= Clement Coughlan =

Irish politician and teacher (1942–1983)

Teachta Dála
- In office June 1981 – 1 February 1983
- Constituency: Donegal South-West
- In office November 1980 – June 1981
- Constituency: Donegal

Personal details
- Born: 14 August 1942 County Donegal, Ireland
- Died: 1 February 1983 (aged 40) County Donegal, Ireland
- Party: Fianna Fáil
- Relatives: Cathal Coughlan (brother); Mary Coughlan (niece)

Clement Coughlan (14 August 1942 – 1 February 1983) was an Irish Fianna Fáil politician and school teacher from County Donegal. He was elected to Dáil Éireann in a 1980 by-election as a Fianna Fáil Teachta Dála (TD) for the Donegal constituency. He only served in public office for two years before his death in a road traffic accident on 1 February 1983.

In a morbid twist his death and the timing of his funeral is considered to be the deciding factor in keeping Charles Haughey as leader of Fianna Fáil, when the support for the campaign to oust him dwindled following the funeral. Coughlan's brother, Cathal Coughlan, was elected in the subsequent by-election. His niece, Mary Coughlan was also a TD and Minister.

He also played at senior level for the Donegal county football team.

== See also ==
- Families in the Oireachtas

Dáil	Election	Deputy (Party)	Deputy (Party)	Deputy (Party)	Deputy (Party)	Deputy (Party)	Deputy (Party)	Deputy (Party)	Deputy (Party)
2nd	1921	Joseph O'Doherty (SF)	Samuel O'Flaherty (SF)	Patrick McGoldrick (SF)	Joseph McGinley (SF)	Joseph Sweeney (SF)	Peter Ward (SF)	6 seats 1921–1923	
3rd	1922	Joseph O'Doherty (AT-SF)	Samuel O'Flaherty (AT-SF)	Patrick McGoldrick (PT-SF)	Joseph McGinley (PT-SF)	Joseph Sweeney (PT-SF)	Peter Ward (PT-SF)	6 seats 1921–1923	
4th	1923	Joseph O'Doherty (Rep)	Peadar O'Donnell (Rep)	Patrick McGoldrick (CnaG)	Eugene Doherty (CnaG)	Patrick McFadden (CnaG)	Peter Ward (CnaG)	James Myles (Ind.)	John White (FP)
4th	1924 by-election	Joseph O'Doherty (Rep)	Peadar O'Donnell (Rep)	Patrick McGoldrick (CnaG)	Eugene Doherty (CnaG)	Patrick McFadden (CnaG)	Denis McCullough (CnaG)	James Myles (Ind.)	John White (FP)
5th	1927 (Jun)	Frank Carney (FF)	Neal Blaney (FF)	Daniel McMenamin (NL)	Eugene Doherty (CnaG)	Michael Óg McFadden (CnaG)	Hugh Law (CnaG)	James Myles (Ind.)	John White (FP)
6th	1927 (Sep)	Frank Carney (FF)	Neal Blaney (FF)	Archie Cassidy (Lab)	Eugene Doherty (CnaG)	Michael Óg McFadden (CnaG)	Hugh Law (CnaG)	James Myles (Ind.)	John White (FP)
7th	1932	Frank Carney (FF)	Neal Blaney (FF)	Brian Brady (FF)	Eugene Doherty (CnaG)	Daniel McMenamin (CnaG)	James Dillon (Ind.)	James Myles (Ind.)	John White (CnaG)
8th	1933	Joseph O'Doherty (FF)	Neal Blaney (FF)	Brian Brady (FF)	Hugh Doherty (FF)	Daniel McMenamin (CnaG)	James Dillon (NCP)	James Myles (Ind.)	Michael Óg McFadden (CnaG)
9th	1937	Constituency abolished. See Donegal East and Donegal West							

Dáil	Election	Deputy (Party)	Deputy (Party)	Deputy (Party)	Deputy (Party)	Deputy (Party)
21st	1977	Hugh Conaghan (FF)	Joseph Brennan (FF)	Neil Blaney (IFF)	James White (FG)	Paddy Harte (FG)
21st	1980 by-election	Hugh Conaghan (FF)	Clement Coughlan (FF)	Neil Blaney (IFF)	James White (FG)	Paddy Harte (FG)
22nd	1981	Constituency abolished. See Donegal North-East and Donegal South-West				

Dáil	Election	Deputy (Party)	Deputy (Party)	Deputy (Party)	Deputy (Party)	Deputy (Party)
32nd	2016	Pearse Doherty (SF)	Pat "the Cope" Gallagher (FF)	Thomas Pringle (Ind.)	Charlie McConalogue (FF)	Joe McHugh (FG)
33rd	2020	Pearse Doherty (SF)	Pádraig Mac Lochlainn (SF)	Thomas Pringle (Ind.)	Charlie McConalogue (FF)	Joe McHugh (FG)
34th	2024	Pearse Doherty (SF)	Pádraig Mac Lochlainn (SF)	Charles Ward (100%R)	Charlie McConalogue (FF)	Pat "the Cope" Gallagher (FF)

Dáil	Election	Deputy (Party)	Deputy (Party)	Deputy (Party)
17th	1961	Joseph Brennan (FF)	Cormac Breslin (FF)	Patrick O'Donnell (FG)
18th	1965	Joseph Brennan (FF)	Cormac Breslin (FF)	Patrick O'Donnell (FG)
19th	1969	Constituency abolished. See Donegal–Leitrim		

Dáil	Election	Deputy (Party)	Deputy (Party)	Deputy (Party)
22nd	1981	Pat "the Cope" Gallagher (FF)	Clement Coughlan (FF)	James White (FG)
23rd	1982 (Feb)	Pat "the Cope" Gallagher (FF)	Clement Coughlan (FF)	Dinny McGinley (FG)
24th	1982 (Nov)	Pat "the Cope" Gallagher (FF)	Clement Coughlan (FF)	Dinny McGinley (FG)
24th	1983 by-election	Pat "the Cope" Gallagher (FF)	Cathal Coughlan (FF)	Dinny McGinley (FG)
25th	1987	Pat "the Cope" Gallagher (FF)	Mary Coughlan (FF)	Dinny McGinley (FG)
26th	1989	Pat "the Cope" Gallagher (FF)	Mary Coughlan (FF)	Dinny McGinley (FG)
27th	1992	Pat "the Cope" Gallagher (FF)	Mary Coughlan (FF)	Dinny McGinley (FG)
28th	1997	Tom Gildea (Ind.)	Mary Coughlan (FF)	Dinny McGinley (FG)
29th	2002	Pat "the Cope" Gallagher (FF)	Mary Coughlan (FF)	Dinny McGinley (FG)
30th	2007	Pat "the Cope" Gallagher (FF)	Mary Coughlan (FF)	Dinny McGinley (FG)
30th	2010 by-election	Pearse Doherty (SF)	Mary Coughlan (FF)	Dinny McGinley (FG)
31st	2011	Pearse Doherty (SF)	Thomas Pringle (Ind.)	Dinny McGinley (FG)
32nd	2016	Constituency abolished. See Donegal		
