= Dinny McGinley =

Irish former politician (born 1945)

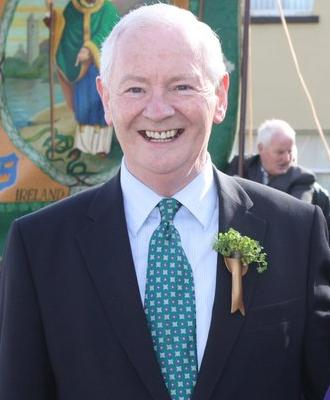

Minister of State
- 2011–2014: Arts, Heritage and the Gaeltacht

Teachta Dála
- In office February 1982 – February 2016
- Constituency: Donegal South-West

Personal details
- Born: Denis McGinley; 27 April 1945 (age 81) Gweedore, County Donegal, Ireland
- Party: Fine Gael
- Education: St Patrick's College, Dublin; University College Dublin

Denis McGinley (born 27 April 1945) is an Irish former Fine Gael politician who served as a Minister of State from 2011 to 2014. He served as a Teachta Dála (TD) for the Donegal South-West constituency from 1982 to 2016.

== Background ==
McGinley was born and brought up in Gweedore, County Donegal, a Gaeltacht area where he still resides. He was educated at Coláiste Íosagáin, Ballyvourney, County Cork; St Patrick's College, Dublin; and University College Dublin where he received a Bachelor of Arts degree. He worked as a teacher and principal at Scoil Chonaill at Bunbeg, Gweedore, before entering politics.

== Political life ==
McGinley was first elected to Dáil Éireann at the February 1982 general election. During his time as a TD he held a number of Front Bench positions within the Fine Gael, including Spokesman on Youth Affairs (1987–88), the Gaeltacht (1988–91), the Gaeltacht and Emigrant Welfare (1991–94), Youth Affairs (1994), Arts, Heritage, Gaeltacht and the Islands (2001–02), Defence (2002–04) and Community, Rural and Gaeltacht Affairs (2004–07).

McGinley was Chairman of An Comhchoiste don Ghaeilge (Oireachtas Committee on the Irish Language) from 1995 to 1997. He is a former member of the Joint Oireachtas Committees on Social Affairs and on Small Business and is a member of the British Irish Parliamentary Body since 1993.

In June 2006, he announced his intention to retire at the 2007 general election; however, he announced in February 2007, that he had changed his mind, and would stand as he stood a better chance of being elected than the selected candidate. He was re-elected at the 2007 general election, and again at the 2011 general election.

On 10 March 2011, he was appointed by the Fine Gael–Labour government as Minister of State at the Department of Arts, Heritage and the Gaeltacht with special responsibility for Gaeltacht Affairs on the nomination of Taoiseach Enda Kenny. He was dropped as a Minister of State in a reshuffle in July 2014. Shortly afterwards, he announced that he would not contest the 2016 general election.

Political offices
New office	Minister of State for Gaeltacht Affairs; 2011–2014	Succeeded by Joe McHugh

Dáil	Election	Deputy (Party)	Deputy (Party)	Deputy (Party)
17th	1961	Joseph Brennan (FF)	Cormac Breslin (FF)	Patrick O'Donnell (FG)
18th	1965	Joseph Brennan (FF)	Cormac Breslin (FF)	Patrick O'Donnell (FG)
19th	1969	Constituency abolished. See Donegal–Leitrim		

Dáil	Election	Deputy (Party)	Deputy (Party)	Deputy (Party)
22nd	1981	Pat "the Cope" Gallagher (FF)	Clement Coughlan (FF)	James White (FG)
23rd	1982 (Feb)	Pat "the Cope" Gallagher (FF)	Clement Coughlan (FF)	Dinny McGinley (FG)
24th	1982 (Nov)	Pat "the Cope" Gallagher (FF)	Clement Coughlan (FF)	Dinny McGinley (FG)
24th	1983 by-election	Pat "the Cope" Gallagher (FF)	Cathal Coughlan (FF)	Dinny McGinley (FG)
25th	1987	Pat "the Cope" Gallagher (FF)	Mary Coughlan (FF)	Dinny McGinley (FG)
26th	1989	Pat "the Cope" Gallagher (FF)	Mary Coughlan (FF)	Dinny McGinley (FG)
27th	1992	Pat "the Cope" Gallagher (FF)	Mary Coughlan (FF)	Dinny McGinley (FG)
28th	1997	Tom Gildea (Ind.)	Mary Coughlan (FF)	Dinny McGinley (FG)
29th	2002	Pat "the Cope" Gallagher (FF)	Mary Coughlan (FF)	Dinny McGinley (FG)
30th	2007	Pat "the Cope" Gallagher (FF)	Mary Coughlan (FF)	Dinny McGinley (FG)
30th	2010 by-election	Pearse Doherty (SF)	Mary Coughlan (FF)	Dinny McGinley (FG)
31st	2011	Pearse Doherty (SF)	Thomas Pringle (Ind.)	Dinny McGinley (FG)
32nd	2016	Constituency abolished. See Donegal		
