= Pearse Doherty =

Irish politician (born 1977)

Pearse Doherty TD
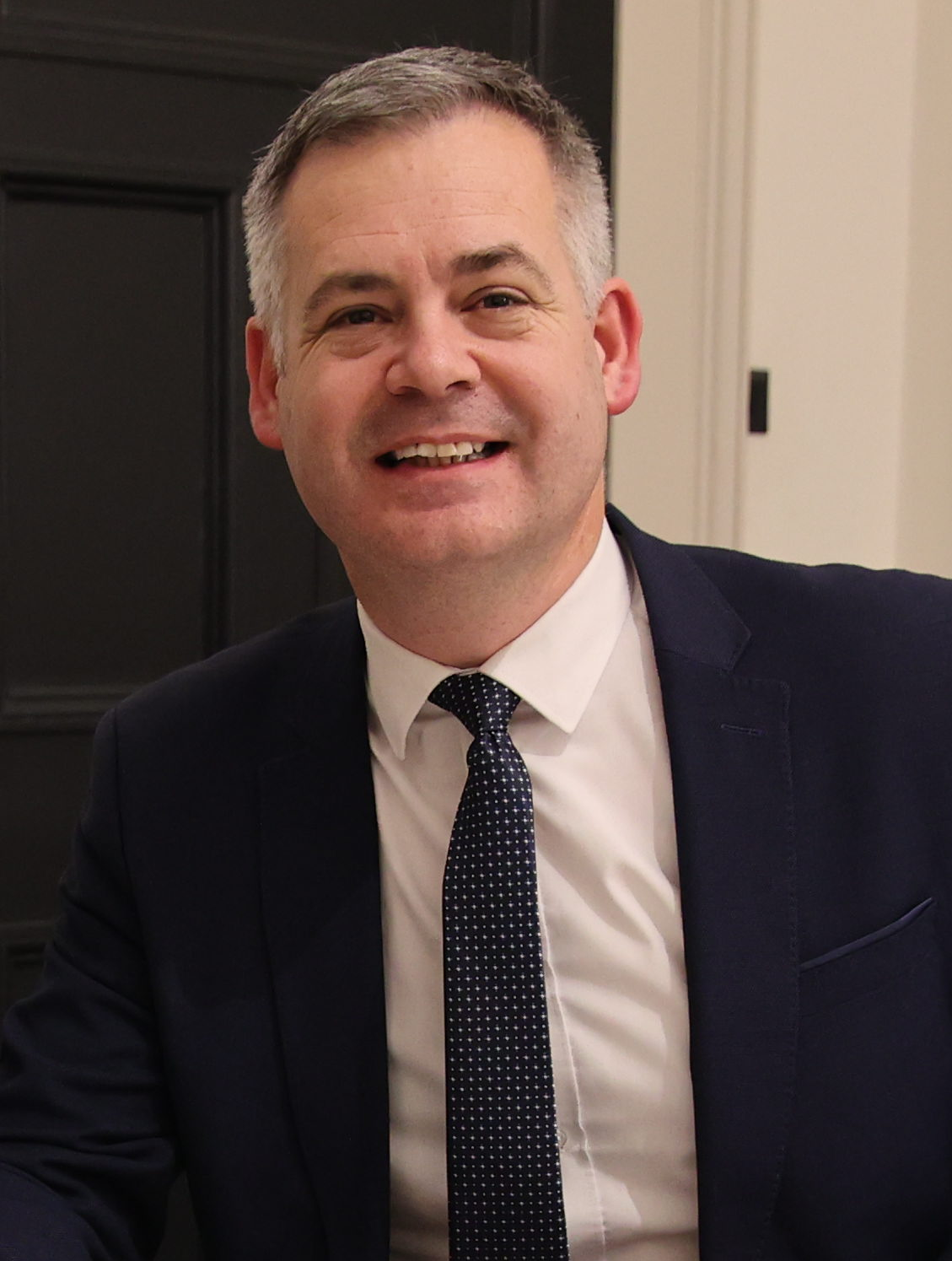
- Doherty in 2024

Deputy leader of Sinn Féin in Dáil Éireann
- Incumbent
- Assumed office 29 May 2018
- President: Mary Lou McDonald
- Preceded by: New office

Teachta Dála
- Incumbent
- Assumed office February 2016
- Constituency: Donegal
- In office November 2010 – February 2016
- Constituency: Donegal South-West

Senator
- In office 13 September 2007 – 26 November 2010
- Constituency: Agricultural Panel

Donegal County Councillor
- In office 2004–2007
- Constituency: Glenties

Personal details
- Born: 6 July 1977 (age 49) Glasgow, Scotland
- Party: Sinn Féin
- Spouse: Róisín Doherty (m. 2009)
- Children: 4
- Education: Dublin Institute of Technology
- Website: Official website

Pearse Daniel Doherty (born 6 July 1977) is an Irish Sinn Féin politician who has been a Teachta Dála (TD) for the Donegal constituency since the 2016 general election, and previously a TD for the Donegal South-West constituency from 2010 to 2016. He also previously served as a Senator for the Agricultural Panel from 2007 to 2010.

== Early life ==
Pearse Daniel Doherty was born in Glasgow on 6 July 1977, the son of Irish parents. When he was three years old, the family returned home to the Irish-speaking town of Gweedore, where he grew up and became fluent in Irish. He enrolled in a civil engineering degree course at Dublin Institute of Technology in 1996, but dropped out after 2 years to take on a job in the industry. In 1999, Doherty, Matt Carthy and two other Sinn Féin activists were arrested in Dublin. At a court hearing it was alleged that Doherty had abused a Garda, though it was argued Doherty's comment was the consequence of a "simple misunderstanding" and was not in any way intended to offend the Garda. He was convicted, but was given the benefit of the Probation Act in lieu of a criminal record.

He completed two years of his civil engineering course, earning a national certificate that entitled him to work as a civil engineering technician. He then left third-level education to pursue a job in that field. He later resumed his studies by enrolling in another civil engineering course at Letterkenny Institute of Technology, but dropped out in order to run for Dáil Éireann in the 2002 general election.

== Political career ==
A member of Sinn Féin since 1996, Doherty was a founding member of Ógra Shinn Féin and served on its national executive between 1998 and 2001.

In the 2002 general election, Doherty ran unsuccessfully in the Donegal South-West constituency. On 11 June 2004, he ran simultaneously at the local elections for Donegal County Council and at the 2004 European Parliament elections. He failed to win a seat in the European Parliament, but was elected to Donegal County Council for the Glenties local electoral area.

Doherty's second attempt to win a Dáil seat, at the 2007 general election, also proved unsuccessful; he received 21.2% of the first-preference vote. However, he was elected to Seanad Éireann as a Senator for the Agricultural Panel on 24 July 2007.

On 12 July 2010, the High Court granted Doherty a judicial review into why the government had not held a by-election to fill the Dáil seat vacated by Fianna Fáil's Pat "the Cope" Gallagher when he won election to the European Parliament in June 2009. On 2 November 2010, the High Court ruled that the government had delayed unreasonably in holding the by-election. In response to the ruling, the government announced that the Donegal South-West by-election would be held on 25 November 2010. Doherty stood as the Sinn Féin candidate and won the by-election by a substantial margin, earning 39.8 percent of the first-preference vote. On taking his seat in the Dáil, Doherty was appointed Sinn Féin's spokesperson on Finance. However, the Dáil was dissolved on 1 February 2011, at which point Doherty had been a TD for just over nine weeks.

Shortly before the 2011 general election, several newspapers alleged that Doherty had misled the public by stating on various Sinn Féin and Oireachtas webpages that he had formerly worked as a "civil engineer", an occupation that presumes a degree-level qualification. Doherty insisted that he had "always been upfront" about the fact that he had not completed his degree, clarified his educational credentials, and acknowledged that he had qualified as a civil engineering technician and not a civil engineer.

In that election Doherty topped the poll decisively in Donegal South-West, attaining 14,262 first-preference votes (32.97%) .

Doherty represented Sinn Féin in the Oireachtas delegation that met the Bundestag's Budgetary and European Affairs committees in Berlin in late January 2012.

It was revealed in June 2012, that Doherty put €8,000 worth of unspent travel and accommodation expenses towards hiring part-time party workers, despite these expenses being supposed to be returned to the Oireachtas under rules introduced in 2010. A report found that he had not breached any expense rules, and cleared him of any wrongdoing.

At the 2016 general election, after a redrawing of constituency boundaries, Doherty was elected to the new five-seater Donegal constituency on the 8th count with 10,300 votes. On 29 May 2018, Doherty was appointed Deputy Leader of Sinn Féin.

He topped the poll at the 2020 general election with 21,044 first-preference votes (27.17%), and was appointed leader of Sinn Féin's negotiations team.

On 16 June 2022, Doherty clashed with Tánaiste Leo Varadkar in the Dáil. Doherty attacked Varadkar for being "out of touch" and brought up Varadkar's legal issues with the DPP. Varadkar responded by calling it a "cheap shot" and brought up a 1999 in which Doherty was convicted of abusing a Garda, saying "You abused, mistreated a Garda Síochána. For that you were prosecuted. You were found guilty. Yes, you got away without a conviction because of your age at the time, but you were actually prosecuted. You were arrested. That's what happened to you."

At the 2024 general election, Doherty was re-elected to the Dáil on the first count. He received the highest number of first preference votes in the country, at 18,898 (24.66%).

== Personal life ==
Doherty continues to reside in Gweedore. He is married to Róisín, a school teacher from County Monaghan. They have four sons.

Dáil	Election	Deputy (Party)	Deputy (Party)	Deputy (Party)
17th	1961	Joseph Brennan (FF)	Cormac Breslin (FF)	Patrick O'Donnell (FG)
18th	1965	Joseph Brennan (FF)	Cormac Breslin (FF)	Patrick O'Donnell (FG)
19th	1969	Constituency abolished. See Donegal–Leitrim		

Dáil	Election	Deputy (Party)	Deputy (Party)	Deputy (Party)
22nd	1981	Pat "the Cope" Gallagher (FF)	Clement Coughlan (FF)	James White (FG)
23rd	1982 (Feb)	Pat "the Cope" Gallagher (FF)	Clement Coughlan (FF)	Dinny McGinley (FG)
24th	1982 (Nov)	Pat "the Cope" Gallagher (FF)	Clement Coughlan (FF)	Dinny McGinley (FG)
24th	1983 by-election	Pat "the Cope" Gallagher (FF)	Cathal Coughlan (FF)	Dinny McGinley (FG)
25th	1987	Pat "the Cope" Gallagher (FF)	Mary Coughlan (FF)	Dinny McGinley (FG)
26th	1989	Pat "the Cope" Gallagher (FF)	Mary Coughlan (FF)	Dinny McGinley (FG)
27th	1992	Pat "the Cope" Gallagher (FF)	Mary Coughlan (FF)	Dinny McGinley (FG)
28th	1997	Tom Gildea (Ind.)	Mary Coughlan (FF)	Dinny McGinley (FG)
29th	2002	Pat "the Cope" Gallagher (FF)	Mary Coughlan (FF)	Dinny McGinley (FG)
30th	2007	Pat "the Cope" Gallagher (FF)	Mary Coughlan (FF)	Dinny McGinley (FG)
30th	2010 by-election	Pearse Doherty (SF)	Mary Coughlan (FF)	Dinny McGinley (FG)
31st	2011	Pearse Doherty (SF)	Thomas Pringle (Ind.)	Dinny McGinley (FG)
32nd	2016	Constituency abolished. See Donegal		

Dáil	Election	Deputy (Party)	Deputy (Party)	Deputy (Party)	Deputy (Party)	Deputy (Party)	Deputy (Party)	Deputy (Party)	Deputy (Party)
2nd	1921	Joseph O'Doherty (SF)	Samuel O'Flaherty (SF)	Patrick McGoldrick (SF)	Joseph McGinley (SF)	Joseph Sweeney (SF)	Peter Ward (SF)	6 seats 1921–1923	
3rd	1922	Joseph O'Doherty (AT-SF)	Samuel O'Flaherty (AT-SF)	Patrick McGoldrick (PT-SF)	Joseph McGinley (PT-SF)	Joseph Sweeney (PT-SF)	Peter Ward (PT-SF)	6 seats 1921–1923	
4th	1923	Joseph O'Doherty (Rep)	Peadar O'Donnell (Rep)	Patrick McGoldrick (CnaG)	Eugene Doherty (CnaG)	Patrick McFadden (CnaG)	Peter Ward (CnaG)	James Myles (Ind.)	John White (FP)
4th	1924 by-election	Joseph O'Doherty (Rep)	Peadar O'Donnell (Rep)	Patrick McGoldrick (CnaG)	Eugene Doherty (CnaG)	Patrick McFadden (CnaG)	Denis McCullough (CnaG)	James Myles (Ind.)	John White (FP)
5th	1927 (Jun)	Frank Carney (FF)	Neal Blaney (FF)	Daniel McMenamin (NL)	Eugene Doherty (CnaG)	Michael Óg McFadden (CnaG)	Hugh Law (CnaG)	James Myles (Ind.)	John White (FP)
6th	1927 (Sep)	Frank Carney (FF)	Neal Blaney (FF)	Archie Cassidy (Lab)	Eugene Doherty (CnaG)	Michael Óg McFadden (CnaG)	Hugh Law (CnaG)	James Myles (Ind.)	John White (FP)
7th	1932	Frank Carney (FF)	Neal Blaney (FF)	Brian Brady (FF)	Eugene Doherty (CnaG)	Daniel McMenamin (CnaG)	James Dillon (Ind.)	James Myles (Ind.)	John White (CnaG)
8th	1933	Joseph O'Doherty (FF)	Neal Blaney (FF)	Brian Brady (FF)	Hugh Doherty (FF)	Daniel McMenamin (CnaG)	James Dillon (NCP)	James Myles (Ind.)	Michael Óg McFadden (CnaG)
9th	1937	Constituency abolished. See Donegal East and Donegal West							

Dáil	Election	Deputy (Party)	Deputy (Party)	Deputy (Party)	Deputy (Party)	Deputy (Party)
21st	1977	Hugh Conaghan (FF)	Joseph Brennan (FF)	Neil Blaney (IFF)	James White (FG)	Paddy Harte (FG)
21st	1980 by-election	Hugh Conaghan (FF)	Clement Coughlan (FF)	Neil Blaney (IFF)	James White (FG)	Paddy Harte (FG)
22nd	1981	Constituency abolished. See Donegal North-East and Donegal South-West				

Dáil	Election	Deputy (Party)	Deputy (Party)	Deputy (Party)	Deputy (Party)	Deputy (Party)
32nd	2016	Pearse Doherty (SF)	Pat "the Cope" Gallagher (FF)	Thomas Pringle (Ind.)	Charlie McConalogue (FF)	Joe McHugh (FG)
33rd	2020	Pearse Doherty (SF)	Pádraig Mac Lochlainn (SF)	Thomas Pringle (Ind.)	Charlie McConalogue (FF)	Joe McHugh (FG)
34th	2024	Pearse Doherty (SF)	Pádraig Mac Lochlainn (SF)	Charles Ward (100%R)	Charlie McConalogue (FF)	Pat "the Cope" Gallagher (FF)
