= 1970 Donegal–Leitrim by-election =

By-election to the 19th Dáil

- 2 December 1970
- Turnout: 29,215 (75.7%)
	Delap	White	Gilmartin
Nominee	Patrick Delap	James White	Maeve Gilmartin
Party	Fianna Fáil	Fine Gael	Labour
First preferences	15,485	12,926	804
Percentage	53.0%	44.2%	2.8%
TD before election
Patrick O'Donnell
Fine Gael
TD after election
Patrick Delap
Fianna Fáil

A Dáil by-election was held in the constituency of Donegal–Leitrim in Ireland on Wednesday, 2 December 1970, to fill a vacancy in the 19th Dáil. It followed the death of Fine Gael Teachta Dála (TD) Patrick O'Donnell on 4 October 1970.

The writ of election to fill the vacancy was agreed by the Dáil on 3 November 1970.

The by-election was won by the Fianna Fáil candidate Patrick Delap. It was held on the same day as the 1970 Dublin County South by-election.

Delap lost his seat at the 1973 general election, and was never subsequently re-elected to the Dáil.

== Result ==
1970 Donegal–Leitrim by-election
Party	Candidate	FPv%	Count
Party	Candidate	FPv%	1
Fianna Fáil	Patrick Delap	53.0	15,485
Fine Gael	James White	44.2	12,926
Labour	Maeve Gilmartin	2.8	804
Electorate: 38,605 Valid: 29,215 Quota: 14,608 Turnout: 75.7%
