= Fourth Amendment of the Constitution of Ireland =

1972 Amendment lowering the voting age

- 7 December 1972
- To lower the voting age from 21 to 18

Results
Choice	Votes	%
Yes	724,836	84.64%
No	131,514	15.36%
Valid votes	856,350	94.79%
Invalid or blank votes	47,089	5.21%
Total votes	903,439	100.00%
Registered voters/turnout	1,783,604	50.65%

The Fourth Amendment of the Constitution Act 1972 is an amendment to the Constitution of Ireland which lowered the voting age for all national elections and referendums in the state from twenty-one to eighteen years of age. It was approved by referendum on 7 December 1972 and signed into law on 5 January 1973.

== Background ==
The Fourth Amendment altered Article 16 which deals with elections to Dáil Éireann (the house of representatives of the Oireachtas). However other provisions of the constitution state that anyone entitled to vote in Dáil elections is also entitled to participate in the election of the President and in referendums, so the amendment affected these votes as well. The amendment did not, however, affect the minimum age at which one could be elected to the Dáil, and this remained at twenty-one.

It was submitted to a referendum on the same day as the Fifth Amendment, which removed from the constitution reference to the "special position" of the Catholic Church and recognition of certain other named denominations.

== Changes to the text ==
The Amendment altered the text of Article 16.1.2° in the following manner:

Deletion from Article (removed text in bold):

Every citizen without distinction of sex who has reached the age of twenty-one years who is not disqualified by law and complies with the provisions of the law relating to the election of members of Dáil Éireann, shall have the right to vote at an election for members of Dáil Éireann.

Addition to Article 16.1.2 (added text in bold):

Every citizen without distinction of sex who has reached the age of eighteen years who is not disqualified by law and complies with the provisions of the law relating to the election of members of Dáil Éireann, shall have the right to vote at an election for members of Dáil Éireann.

== Oireachtas debate ==
On 16 February 1972, Brendan Corish, leader of the Labour Party, proposed a constitutional amendment as a private member's bill to lower the voting age to 18. This was opposed by the Fianna Fáil government as it did not wish to hold such a referendum until after the referendum on the proposed Third Amendment on Accession to the European Communities (which was passed on 10 May 1972).

On 28 June 1972, the Minister for Foreign Affairs Patrick Hillery moved the Fourth Amendment of the Constitution Bill 1972 on behalf of the Fianna Fáil government. At second stage, it was proposed by the Minister for Local Government Bobby Molloy. It was supported by the opposition parties Fine Gael and the Labour Party, and passed final stages in the Dáil on 11 July. It passed all stages in the Seanad on 13 July, and proceeded to a referendum on 7 December 1972.

== Result ==
Fourth Amendment of the Constitution of Ireland referendum
Choice	Votes	%
For	724,836	84.64
Against	131,514	15.36
**Total**	**856,350**	**100.00**
Valid votes	856,350	94.79
Invalid/blank votes	47,089	5.21
Total votes	**903,439**	**100.00**
Registered voters/turnout	1,783,604	50.65

Results by constituency
Constituency	Electorate	Turnout (%)	Votes		Proportion of votes	
Constituency	Electorate	Turnout (%)	Yes	No	Yes	No
Carlow–Kilkenny	59,415	55.2%	26,688	3,966	87.1%	12.9%
Cavan	37,229	54.0%	16,737	1,875	89.9%	10.1%
Clare	39,413	47.5%	15,389	2,177	87.6%	12.4%
Clare–South Galway	34,820	52.5%	15,425	1,759	89.8%	10.2%
Cork City North-West	36,115	48.2%	12,737	3,881	76.6%	23.4%
Cork City South-East	36,476	54.1%	14,561	4,436	76.6%	23.4%
Cork Mid	49,402	53.8%	21,069	4,040	83.9%	16.1%
Cork North-East	50,016	54.8%	21,521	4,201	83.7%	16.3%
Cork South-West	38,285	53.1%	15,259	3,947	79.4%	20.6%
Donegal North-East	37,924	43.4%	13,620	1,408	90.6%	9.4%
Donegal–Leitrim	38,540	46.2%	15,092	1,538	90.8%	9.2%
Dublin Central	46,775	43.7%	15,663	3,752	80.7%	19.3%
Dublin County North	58,761	48.6%	23,386	4,370	84.3%	15.7%
Dublin County South	45,289	55.9%	20,239	4,461	81.9%	18.1%
Dublin North-Central	49,073	49.5%	18,734	4,850	79.4%	20.6%
Dublin North-East	55,483	52.9%	23,801	4,835	83.1%	16.9%
Dublin North-West	44,369	46.5%	16,419	3,471	82.5%	17.5%
Dublin South-Central	50,400	48.6%	18,915	4,983	79.1%	20.9%
Dublin South-East	37,840	50.4%	14,485	3,809	79.2%	20.8%
Dublin South-West	41,740	44.8%	14,942	2,831	84.1%	15.9%
Dún Laoghaire and Rathdown	56,151	57.7%	25,656	6,032	81.0%	19.0%
Galway North-East	34,358	47.1%	13,856	1,296	91.4%	8.6%
Galway West	35,999	42.6%	12,747	1,981	86.5%	13.5%
Kerry North	37,018	43.0%	13,088	1,801	92.8%	7.2%
Kerry South	36,391	43.2%	12,967	1,652	88.7%	11.3%
Kildare	40,065	50.6%	16,851	2,492	87.1%	12.9%
Laois–Offaly	56,344	55.0%	25,663	4,079	86.3%	13.7%
Limerick East	47,001	54.5%	19,074	5,177	78.7%	21.3%
Limerick West	35,904	56.4%	16,621	2,548	86.7%	13.3%
Longford–Westmeath	47,095	49.4%	18,738	2,964	86.3%	13.7%
Louth	40,278	50.4%	16,249	2,984	84.5%	15.5%
Mayo East	34,810	46.2%	13,830	1,271	91.6%	8.4%
Mayo West	34,106	44.3%	12,734	1,321	90.6%	9.4%
Meath	39,040	50.2%	15,665	2,665	85.5%	14.5%
Monaghan	36,214	47.3%	14,000	1,899	88.1%	11.9%
Roscommon–Leitrim	37,682	51.3%	15,827	2,035	88.6%	11.4%
Sligo–Leitrim	38,049	48.8%	15,068	2,129	87.6%	12.4%
Tipperary North	34,754	58.0%	15,862	2,780	85.1%	14.9%
Tipperary South	46,127	58.6%	21,342	3,963	84.3%	15.7%
Waterford	39,513	53.6%	16,836	3,241	83.8%	16.2%
Wexford	49,881	52.3%	21,121	3,408	86.1%	13.9%
Wicklow	39,389	52.0%	16,359	3,206	83.6%	16.4%
**Total**	**1,783,604**	**50.7%**	724,836	**131,514**	84.6%	**15.4%**

== Implementation ==
The 19th Dáil was dissolved on 5 February 1973 and a general election was held on 28 February. However, the electoral register was updated only every 15 April, so those under 21 were unable to vote despite the amendment. A 20-year-old student, represented by Seán MacBride, asked the High Court to postpone the election to vindicate his right to vote. He lost his case, although he was awarded his costs due to its "public importance".

Although the names of under-21s had already been added to the provisional register, it was the Electoral (Amendment) Act 1973 passed on 9 April which reduced the age limits in statute law in line with the amended constitution. The first under-21s to vote were a few graduates of the National University and Dublin University elections to the 13th Seanad.

The later Ninth Amendment passed in 1984 altered the text of Article 16.1.2° in a manner which would permit legislation to include certain people who are not citizens to be added to the register for elections to Dáil Éireann. However, the franchise for presidential elections and referendums remained restricted to Irish citizens.

== See also ==
- Suffrage
- Politics of the Republic of Ireland
- History of the Republic of Ireland
- Constitutional amendment
- December 1972 Irish constitutional referendum
- Amendment XXVI to the U.S. Constitution (lowered voting age to 18)
