= Patrick Delap =

Irish politician (1932–1987)

Teachta Dála
- In office December 1970 – February 1973
- Constituency: Donegal–Leitrim

Personal details
- Born: 17 March 1932 County Donegal, Ireland
- Died: 14 May 1987 (aged 55) County Donegal, Ireland
- Party: Fianna Fáil

Patrick Columba Delap (17 March 1932 – 14 May 1987) was an Irish Fianna Fáil politician and medical doctor. He was first elected to Dáil Éireann at a 1970 by-election as a Fianna Fáil Teachta Dála (TD) for Donegal–Leitrim. The by-election was caused by the death of the Fine Gael TD Patrick O'Donnell.

He served for three years before he lost his seat at the 1973 general election. He stood again for the Dáil at the 1977 general election but was not elected.

Dáil	Election	Deputy (Party)	Deputy (Party)	Deputy (Party)
19th	1969	Cormac Breslin (Note: Breslin was Ceann Comhairle from 1967 to 1973. As outgoing Ceann Comhairle, he was automatically re-elected at the 1969 and 1973 general elections.) (FF)	Joseph Brennan (FF)	Patrick O'Donnell (FG)
19th	1970 by-election	Cormac Breslin (FF)	Joseph Brennan (FF)	Patrick Delap (FF)
20th	1973	Cormac Breslin (FF)	Joseph Brennan (FF)	James White (FG)
21st	1977	Constituency abolished. See Donegal and Sligo–Leitrim		
