= 1949 Donegal West by-election =

By-election to the 13th Dáil

- 16 November 1949
- Turnout: 26,768 (71.3%)
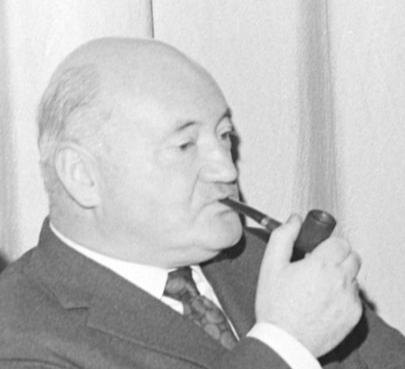
	O'Donnell		Canning
Nominee	Patrick O'Donnell	Joseph Brennan	Alphonsus Canning
Party	Fine Gael	Fianna Fáil	Clann na Poblachta
First preferences	11,256	12,700	2,812
Percentage	42.1%	47.4%	10.5%
Final count	13,634	12,863	–
TD before election
Brian Brady
Fianna Fáil
TD after election
Patrick O'Donnell
Fine Gael

A Dáil by-election was held in the constituency of Donegal West in Ireland on Wednesday, 16 November 1949, to fill a vacancy in the 13th Dáil. It followed the death of Fianna Fáil Teachta Dála (TD) Brian Brady on 10 September 1949.

The writ of election to fill the vacancy was agreed by the Dáil on 26 October 1949.

The by-election was won by the Fine Gael candidate Patrick O'Donnell.

The runner-up Joseph Brennan of Fianna Fáil, was elected for Donegal West at the 1951 general election.

== Result ==
1949 Donegal West by-election
Party	Candidate	FPv%	Count	
Party	Candidate	FPv%	1	2
Fianna Fáil	Joseph Brennan	47.4	12,700	12,863
Fine Gael	Patrick O'Donnell	42.1	11,256	13,634
Clann na Poblachta	Alphonsus Canning	10.5	2,812	
Electorate: 37,541 Valid: 26,768 Quota: 13,385 Turnout: 71.3%
