= Joseph Brennan (Fianna Fáil politician) =

Irish politician (1912–1980)

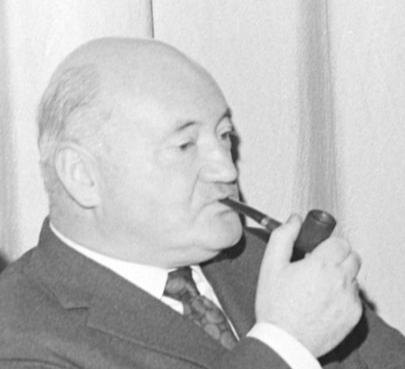

Ceann Comhairle of Dáil Éireann
- In office 5 July 1977 – 13 July 1980
- Deputy: Seán Browne
- Preceded by: Seán Treacy
- Succeeded by: Pádraig Faulkner

Minister for Social Welfare
- In office 6 May 1970 – 14 March 1973
- Taoiseach: Jack Lynch
- Preceded by: Kevin Boland
- Succeeded by: Brendan Corish
- In office 16 November 1966 – 2 July 1969
- Taoiseach: Jack Lynch
- Preceded by: Kevin Boland
- Succeeded by: Kevin Boland

Minister for Labour
- In office 2 July 1969 – 14 March 1973
- Taoiseach: Jack Lynch
- Preceded by: Patrick Hillery
- Succeeded by: Michael O'Leary

Minister for Posts and Telegraphs
- In office 21 April 1965 – 10 November 1966
- Taoiseach: Seán Lemass
- Preceded by: Michael Hilliard
- Succeeded by: Erskine H. Childers

Parliamentary Secretary
- 1961–1965: Government Chief Whip
- 1961–1965: Defence
- 1959–1961: Finance

Teachta Dála
- In office June 1977 – 13 July 1980
- Constituency: Donegal
- In office June 1969 – June 1977
- Constituency: Donegal–Leitrim
- In office October 1961 – June 1969
- Constituency: Donegal South-West
- In office May 1951 – October 1961
- Constituency: Donegal West

Personal details
- Born: 14 February 1913 Dunkineely, County Donegal, Ireland
- Died: 13 July 1980 (aged 67) Bruckless, County Donegal, Ireland
- Party: Fianna Fáil
- Spouse: Margaret McDevitt (m. 1942)
- Children: 5

Joseph Peter Brennan (14 February 1913 – 13 July 1980) was an Irish Fianna Fáil politician who served as Ceann Comhairle of Dáil Éireann from 1977 to 1980, Deputy leader of Fianna Fáil from 1973 to 1977, Minister for Social Welfare from 1970 to 1973 and 1966 to 1969, Minister for Labour from 1969 to 1973, Minister for Posts and Telegraphs from 1965 to 1966, and a Parliamentary Secretary from 1959 to 1965. He served as a Teachta Dála (TD) from 1951 to 1980.

== Early and personal life ==
He was born in Dunkineely, County Donegal, the son of farmer Francis Brennan and Hannah Carr. He was educated locally and developed great skill at Gaelic football, playing for his county team.

He began his working life as a freelance journalist with The Irish Press and the Donegal Democrat before establishing himself as an auctioneer, estate agent, and spirit merchant. During The Emergency he served in the FCA, retiring as Officer commanding of the South Donegal Battalion.

He married first Bridget (d. 1940), they had one son and four daughters. In February 1942 he married Margaret McDevitt.

== Politics ==
He polled the highest number of first preferences in the 1949 Donegal West by-election but failed to be elected. Brennan was elected as a Fianna Fáil Teachta Dála (TD) for the Donegal West constituency at the 1951 general election and was re-elected at each election until his death. As constituency boundaries were changed, he represented Donegal South-West from 1961 to 1969, Donegal–Leitrim from 1969 to 1977, and Donegal from 1977 to 1980.

In 1959, when Seán Lemass succeeded as Taoiseach, Brennan was appointed as Parliamentary Secretary to the Minister for Finance. After the 1961 general election, he was appointed as Government Chief Whip, as Parliamentary Secretary to the Taoiseach, and Parliamentary Secretary to the Minister for Defence. After the 1965 general election, Brennan joined the cabinet when he was appointed as Minister for Posts and Telegraphs.

In 1966, when Jack Lynch succeeded as Taoiseach, Brennan was appointed as Minister for Social Welfare. Following the 1969 general election he was appointed as Minister for Labour. In the wake of the Arms Crisis in 1970 he was appointed to the additional portfolio of Social Welfare. After the 1973 general election, Fine Gael and the Labour Party formed a National Coalition government.

Fianna Fáil were returned to office after the 1977 general election. Brennan was elected Ceann Comhairle of Dáil Éireann, a position he held until his death in 1980, aged 67.

The by-election for his seat in the Donegal constituency was held on 6 November 1980, and won by the Fianna Fáil candidate Clement Coughlan.

He was president of the Statistical and Social Inquiry Society of Ireland between 1934 and 1938.

Political offices
Preceded by Gerald Bartley	Parliamentary Secretary to the Minister for Finance; 1959–1961	Succeeded by Donogh O'Malley
Preceded by Donnchadh Ó Briain	Government Chief Whip; 1961–1965	Succeeded by Michael Carty
Preceded by Donnchadh Ó Briain	Parliamentary Secretary to the Minister for Defence; 1961–1965	Succeeded by Michael Carty
Preceded by Michael Hilliard	Minister for Posts and Telegraphs; 1965–1966	Succeeded by Erskine H. Childers
Preceded by Kevin Boland	Minister for Social Welfare; 1966–1969	Succeeded by Kevin Boland
Preceded by Patrick Hillery	Minister for Labour; 1969–1973	Succeeded by Michael O'Leary
Preceded by Kevin Boland	Minister for Social Welfare; 1970–1973	Succeeded by Brendan Corish
Preceded by Seán Treacy	Ceann Comhairle of Dáil Éireann; 1977–1980	Succeeded by Pádraig Faulkner
Party political offices
New post	Deputy leader of Fianna Fáil; 1973–1977	Succeeded by George Colley

Dáil	Election	Deputy (Party)	Deputy (Party)	Deputy (Party)
9th	1937	Cormac Breslin (FF)	Brian Brady (FF)	Michael Óg McFadden (FG)
10th	1938	Cormac Breslin (FF)	Brian Brady (FF)	Michael Óg McFadden (FG)
11th	1943	Cormac Breslin (FF)	Brian Brady (FF)	Michael Óg McFadden (FG)
12th	1944	Cormac Breslin (FF)	Brian Brady (FF)	Michael Óg McFadden (FG)
13th	1948	Cormac Breslin (FF)	Brian Brady (FF)	Michael Óg McFadden (FG)
13th	1949 by-election	Cormac Breslin (FF)	Patrick O'Donnell (FG)	Michael Óg McFadden (FG)
14th	1951	Cormac Breslin (FF)	Patrick O'Donnell (FG)	Joseph Brennan (FF)
15th	1954	Cormac Breslin (FF)	Patrick O'Donnell (FG)	Joseph Brennan (FF)
16th	1957	Cormac Breslin (FF)	Patrick O'Donnell (FG)	Joseph Brennan (FF)
17th	1961	Constituency abolished. See Donegal North-East and Donegal South-West		

Dáil	Election	Deputy (Party)	Deputy (Party)	Deputy (Party)
17th	1961	Joseph Brennan (FF)	Cormac Breslin (FF)	Patrick O'Donnell (FG)
18th	1965	Joseph Brennan (FF)	Cormac Breslin (FF)	Patrick O'Donnell (FG)
19th	1969	Constituency abolished. See Donegal–Leitrim		

Dáil	Election	Deputy (Party)	Deputy (Party)	Deputy (Party)
22nd	1981	Pat "the Cope" Gallagher (FF)	Clement Coughlan (FF)	James White (FG)
23rd	1982 (Feb)	Pat "the Cope" Gallagher (FF)	Clement Coughlan (FF)	Dinny McGinley (FG)
24th	1982 (Nov)	Pat "the Cope" Gallagher (FF)	Clement Coughlan (FF)	Dinny McGinley (FG)
24th	1983 by-election	Pat "the Cope" Gallagher (FF)	Cathal Coughlan (FF)	Dinny McGinley (FG)
25th	1987	Pat "the Cope" Gallagher (FF)	Mary Coughlan (FF)	Dinny McGinley (FG)
26th	1989	Pat "the Cope" Gallagher (FF)	Mary Coughlan (FF)	Dinny McGinley (FG)
27th	1992	Pat "the Cope" Gallagher (FF)	Mary Coughlan (FF)	Dinny McGinley (FG)
28th	1997	Tom Gildea (Ind.)	Mary Coughlan (FF)	Dinny McGinley (FG)
29th	2002	Pat "the Cope" Gallagher (FF)	Mary Coughlan (FF)	Dinny McGinley (FG)
30th	2007	Pat "the Cope" Gallagher (FF)	Mary Coughlan (FF)	Dinny McGinley (FG)
30th	2010 by-election	Pearse Doherty (SF)	Mary Coughlan (FF)	Dinny McGinley (FG)
31st	2011	Pearse Doherty (SF)	Thomas Pringle (Ind.)	Dinny McGinley (FG)
32nd	2016	Constituency abolished. See Donegal		

Dáil	Election	Deputy (Party)	Deputy (Party)	Deputy (Party)
19th	1969	Cormac Breslin (Note: Breslin was Ceann Comhairle from 1967 to 1973. As outgoing Ceann Comhairle, he was automatically re-elected at the 1969 and 1973 general elections.) (FF)	Joseph Brennan (FF)	Patrick O'Donnell (FG)
19th	1970 by-election	Cormac Breslin (FF)	Joseph Brennan (FF)	Patrick Delap (FF)
20th	1973	Cormac Breslin (FF)	Joseph Brennan (FF)	James White (FG)
21st	1977	Constituency abolished. See Donegal and Sligo–Leitrim		

Dáil	Election	Deputy (Party)	Deputy (Party)	Deputy (Party)	Deputy (Party)	Deputy (Party)	Deputy (Party)	Deputy (Party)	Deputy (Party)
2nd	1921	Joseph O'Doherty (SF)	Samuel O'Flaherty (SF)	Patrick McGoldrick (SF)	Joseph McGinley (SF)	Joseph Sweeney (SF)	Peter Ward (SF)	6 seats 1921–1923	
3rd	1922	Joseph O'Doherty (AT-SF)	Samuel O'Flaherty (AT-SF)	Patrick McGoldrick (PT-SF)	Joseph McGinley (PT-SF)	Joseph Sweeney (PT-SF)	Peter Ward (PT-SF)	6 seats 1921–1923	
4th	1923	Joseph O'Doherty (Rep)	Peadar O'Donnell (Rep)	Patrick McGoldrick (CnaG)	Eugene Doherty (CnaG)	Patrick McFadden (CnaG)	Peter Ward (CnaG)	James Myles (Ind.)	John White (FP)
4th	1924 by-election	Joseph O'Doherty (Rep)	Peadar O'Donnell (Rep)	Patrick McGoldrick (CnaG)	Eugene Doherty (CnaG)	Patrick McFadden (CnaG)	Denis McCullough (CnaG)	James Myles (Ind.)	John White (FP)
5th	1927 (Jun)	Frank Carney (FF)	Neal Blaney (FF)	Daniel McMenamin (NL)	Eugene Doherty (CnaG)	Michael Óg McFadden (CnaG)	Hugh Law (CnaG)	James Myles (Ind.)	John White (FP)
6th	1927 (Sep)	Frank Carney (FF)	Neal Blaney (FF)	Archie Cassidy (Lab)	Eugene Doherty (CnaG)	Michael Óg McFadden (CnaG)	Hugh Law (CnaG)	James Myles (Ind.)	John White (FP)
7th	1932	Frank Carney (FF)	Neal Blaney (FF)	Brian Brady (FF)	Eugene Doherty (CnaG)	Daniel McMenamin (CnaG)	James Dillon (Ind.)	James Myles (Ind.)	John White (CnaG)
8th	1933	Joseph O'Doherty (FF)	Neal Blaney (FF)	Brian Brady (FF)	Hugh Doherty (FF)	Daniel McMenamin (CnaG)	James Dillon (NCP)	James Myles (Ind.)	Michael Óg McFadden (CnaG)
9th	1937	Constituency abolished. See Donegal East and Donegal West							

Dáil	Election	Deputy (Party)	Deputy (Party)	Deputy (Party)	Deputy (Party)	Deputy (Party)
21st	1977	Hugh Conaghan (FF)	Joseph Brennan (FF)	Neil Blaney (IFF)	James White (FG)	Paddy Harte (FG)
21st	1980 by-election	Hugh Conaghan (FF)	Clement Coughlan (FF)	Neil Blaney (IFF)	James White (FG)	Paddy Harte (FG)
22nd	1981	Constituency abolished. See Donegal North-East and Donegal South-West				

Dáil	Election	Deputy (Party)	Deputy (Party)	Deputy (Party)	Deputy (Party)	Deputy (Party)
32nd	2016	Pearse Doherty (SF)	Pat "the Cope" Gallagher (FF)	Thomas Pringle (Ind.)	Charlie McConalogue (FF)	Joe McHugh (FG)
33rd	2020	Pearse Doherty (SF)	Pádraig Mac Lochlainn (SF)	Thomas Pringle (Ind.)	Charlie McConalogue (FF)	Joe McHugh (FG)
34th	2024	Pearse Doherty (SF)	Pádraig Mac Lochlainn (SF)	Charles Ward (100%R)	Charlie McConalogue (FF)	Pat "the Cope" Gallagher (FF)
