= Fifth Amendment of the Constitution of Ireland =

Amendment to remove certain references to the Catholic Church

- 7 December 1972
- To remove references to "special position" of the Catholic Church and to other named denominations

Results
| Choice | Votes | % |
|---|---|---|
| Yes | 721,003 | 84.38% |
| No | 133,430 | 15.62% |
| Valid votes | 854,433 | 94.54% |
| Invalid or blank votes | 49,326 | 5.46% |
| Total votes | 903,759 | 100.00% |
| Registered voters/turnout | 1,783,604 | 50.67% |

The Fifth Amendment of the Constitution Act 1972 is an amendment to the Constitution of Ireland which deleted two subsections that recognised the special position of the Catholic Church and that recognised other named religious denominations. It was approved by referendum on 7 December 1972 and signed into law on 5 January 1973.

== Changes to the text ==
The amendment renumbered Article 44.1.1° as Article 41.1 and deleted the following two subsections from Article 41.1:

2° The State recognises the special position of the Holy Catholic Apostolic and Roman Church as the guardian of the Faith professed by the great majority of the citizens.

3° The State also recognises the Church of Ireland, the Presbyterian Church in Ireland, the Methodist Church in Ireland, the Religious Society of Friends in Ireland, as well as the Jewish Congregations and the other religious denominations existing in Ireland at the date of the coming into operation of this Constitution.

== Background to the deleted provisions ==
In drafting the Irish constitution in 1936 and 1937, Éamon de Valera and his advisers chose to reflect what had been a contemporary willingness by constitution drafters and lawmakers in Europe to mention and in some ways recognise religion in explicit detail. This contrasted with many 1920s constitutions, notably the Constitution of the Irish Free State of 1922, which, following the secularism of the initial period after World War I, simply prohibited any discrimination based on religion, or avoided religious issues entirely.

De Valera, his advisers (including John Charles McQuaid, the future Archbishop of Dublin), and the men who put words to de Valera's concepts for the constitution (John Hearne and Mícheál Ó Gríobhtha) faced conflicting demands in drafting of the article on religion.

- The demand from conservative Roman Catholics that Catholicism be established as the state religion of Ireland;
- Protestants' fears of discrimination.
- Prevailing opposition to Judaism.
- The fact that most people in Ireland belonged to some religion, and that the education system and to a lesser extent the health system were denominational in structure, with Roman Catholicism, the Church of Ireland, the Presbyterian Church, the Methodist Church, the Jewish community, and others running their own schools and non-governmental agencies.

De Valera's solution was Article 44. In contemporary terms, it marked a defeat for conservative Catholics, and Pope Pius XI explicitly withheld his approval from it:

- Catholicism was not made the state church.
- Catholicism was given an undefined "special position" on the basis of being the church of the majority. This was not consistent with the stance of pre-Vatican II Catholicism, which claimed the right to legal and political influence on the basis of the claimed objective truth of its teachings rather than the size of its following.
- Other religions were named and recognised on a lower level. The use of the Church of Ireland's official name antagonised conservative Catholics, who saw Catholicism as being the proper and rightful "church of Ireland".
- The Jewish community in Ireland was also given recognition. The explicit granting of a right to exist to the Jewish faith in Ireland marked a significant difference to the legal approach to Jewish rights in other European states, though contemporary Irish society was not free of antisemitism.

Though perceived in retrospect as a sectarian article, Article 44 was praised in 1937 by leaders of Irish Protestant churches (notably the Church of Ireland Archbishop of Dublin) and by Jewish groups. Conservative Catholics condemned it as "liberal".

When the contents of Article 44 were put to Pope Pius XI by Cardinal Eugenio Pacelli (then Cardinal Secretary of State, later Pope Pius XII), the pope stated in diplomatic language: "We do not approve, nor do we not disapprove – we will remain silent." (Italian: "Ni approvo ni non disapprovo; taceremo.") It was said that the pope was privately more appreciative of the constitution, and Pius XII later praised it publicly.

During the 1950s the Catholic Integrist group Maria Duce, led by Irish Catholic priest Denis Fahey, launched a campaign to amend the Article 44 of the Constitution of Ireland. Fahey argued that this was insufficient and that the Constitution should recognise the Catholic Church as being divinely ordained and separate from 'man-made' religions. The campaign succeeded in securing a resolution of support from Westmeath County Council in 1950, but no further progress towards the goal of a constitutional amendment was made.

== Viewpoint in the 1970s ==
By 1972, an article once condemned by critics as liberal and indeed by some as offensive to Catholicism, had come to be seen as out of place, dated, and potentially discriminatory to Protestants. The "special position" granted to the Catholic Church, albeit in an undefined manner, was a special status that was out of step with post-Vatican II Catholic thinking on the relationships between the churches. The Protestant churches, though they had declined in adherents, were more outspoken and willing to express their unhappiness than they had been in the Ireland of the 1920s and 1930s, when many were fearful that criticism of the Irish state would be seen as criticism of Irish independence and so implicitly a preference for the British regime that had ruled Ireland before 1922.

In addition, in the rapprochement between Northern Ireland and what was by then known as the Republic of Ireland, many southerners perceived the "special position" as a barrier to an improved north–south relationship, and even a potential source of discrimination against minorities. In addition, the explicit recognition of certain denominations was seen as unnecessary because of the provisions Article 44.2, which contains guarantees of freedom of worship and against religious discrimination.

== Oireachtas debate ==
The Fifth Amendment of the Constitution Bill 1972 was proposed by Fianna Fáil Taoiseach Jack Lynch. It was supported by the opposition parties Fine Gael and the Labour Party and passed final stages in the Dáil on 2 November 1972. It passed all stages in the Seanad on 3 November and proceeded to a referendum on 7 December 1972.

== Campaign ==
The Catholic Church did not voice any objection to the amendment, but it was opposed by some conservative Catholics. Some leading members of the Church of Ireland and the Jewish community said during the campaign that while they appreciated the Article's recognition of their existence (and in the case of the Jewish community, their right to exist, in contrast to anti-Jewish laws in other states) in 1937, it was no longer needed in the 1970s and had lost its usefulness.

The referendum on the amendment occurred on the same day as the referendum on the Fourth Amendment which lowered the voting age to eighteen.

After its approval by referendum, the amendment was made to the Constitution after it was signed into law by the President of Ireland, who was then Éamon de Valera, the man who had drafted the original article.

== Result ==
Fifth Amendment of the Constitution of Ireland referendum
| Choice | Votes | % |
|---|---|---|
| For | 721,003 | 84.38 |
| Against | 133,430 | 15.62 |
| Total | 854,433 | 100.00 |
| Valid votes | 854,433 | 94.54 |
| Invalid/blank votes | 49,326 | 5.46 |
| Total votes | 903,759 | 100.00 |
| Registered voters/turnout | 1,783,604 | 50.67 |

Results by constituency
| Constituency | Electorate | Turnout (%) | Votes | | Proportion of votes | |
| Constituency | Electorate | Turnout (%) | Yes | No | Yes | No |
|---|---|---|---|---|---|---|
| Carlow–Kilkenny | 59,415 | 55.2% | 26,589 | 4,040 | 86.8% | 13.2% |
| Cavan | 37,229 | 54.0% | 16,775 | 1,838 | 90.1% | 9.9% |
| Clare | 39,413 | 47.6% | 15,099 | 2,389 | 86.3% | 13.7% |
| Clare–South Galway | 34,820 | 52.6% | 15,298 | 1,813 | 89.4% | 10.6% |
| Cork City North-West | 36,115 | 48.2% | 11,821 | 4,805 | 71.1% | 28.9% |
| Cork City South-East | 36,476 | 53.9% | 13,701 | 5,212 | 72.4% | 27.6% |
| Cork Mid | 49,402 | 53.8% | 20,430 | 4,571 | 81.7% | 18.3% |
| Cork North-East | 50,016 | 54.8% | 20,986 | 4,640 | 81.9% | 18.1% |
| Cork South-West | 38,285 | 53.1% | 14,620 | 4,545 | 76.3% | 23.7% |
| Donegal North-East | 37,924 | 43.4% | 13,260 | 1,736 | 88.4% | 11.6% |
| Donegal–Leitrim | 38,540 | 46.2% | 14,705 | 1,937 | 88.0% | 12.0% |
| Dublin Central | 46,775 | 43.7% | 15,718 | 3,648 | 81.2% | 18.8% |
| Dublin County North | 58,761 | 48.6% | 23,804 | 3,897 | 85.9% | 14.1% |
| Dublin County South | 45,289 | 55.5% | 20,966 | 3,572 | 85.4% | 14.6% |
| Dublin North-Central | 49,073 | 49.4% | 18,933 | 4,505 | 80.8% | 19.2% |
| Dublin North-East | 55,483 | 52.9% | 24,128 | 4,450 | 84.4% | 15.6% |
| Dublin North-West | 44,369 | 46.6% | 16,386 | 3,488 | 82.4% | 17.6% |
| Dublin South-Central | 50,400 | 48.7% | 19,582 | 4,134 | 82.6% | 17.4% |
| Dublin South-East | 37,840 | 50.8% | 15,267 | 3,138 | 82.9% | 17.1% |
| Dublin South-West | 41,740 | 45.0% | 14,956 | 2,901 | 83.8% | 16.2% |
| Dún Laoghaire and Rathdown | 56,151 | 57.7% | 27,136 | 4,443 | 85.9% | 14.1% |
| Galway North-East | 34,358 | 47.1% | 13,721 | 1,385 | 90.8% | 9.2% |
| Galway West | 35,999 | 42.7% | 12,903 | 1,813 | 87.7% | 12.3% |
| Kerry North | 37,018 | 43.0% | 12,886 | 1,946 | 86.9% | 13.1% |
| Kerry South | 36,391 | 43.2% | 12,642 | 1,940 | 86.7% | 13.3% |
| Kildare | 40,065 | 50.6% | 16,942 | 2,369 | 87.7% | 12.3% |
| Laois–Offaly | 56,344 | 55.1% | 25,171 | 4,452 | 85.0% | 15.0% |
| Limerick East | 47,001 | 54.5% | 18,109 | 6,133 | 74.7% | 25.3% |
| Limerick West | 35,904 | 56.5% | 16,327 | 2,772 | 85.5% | 14.5% |
| Longford–Westmeath | 47,095 | 49.4% | 18,592 | 3,141 | 85.5% | 14.5% |
| Louth | 40,278 | 50.4% | 16,449 | 2,811 | 85.4% | 14.6% |
| Mayo East | 34,810 | 46.2% | 13,729 | 1,376 | 90.9% | 9.1% |
| Mayo West | 34,106 | 44.3% | 12,593 | 1,419 | 89.9% | 10.1% |
| Meath | 39,040 | 50.2% | 15,689 | 2,577 | 85.9% | 14.1% |
| Monaghan | 36,214 | 47.3% | 13,987 | 1,901 | 88.0% | 12.0% |
| Roscommon–Leitrim | 37,682 | 51.3% | 15,421 | 2,416 | 86.5% | 13.5% |
| Sligo–Leitrim | 38,049 | 48.8% | 14,578 | 2,496 | 85.4% | 14.6% |
| Tipperary North | 34,754 | 58.0% | 15,578 | 3,014 | 83.8% | 16.2% |
| Tipperary South | 46,127 | 58.6% | 20,801 | 4,353 | 82.7% | 17.3% |
| Waterford | 39,513 | 53.6% | 17,174 | 2,902 | 85.5% | 14.5% |
| Wexford | 49,881 | 52.3% | 21,032 | 3,544 | 85.6% | 14.4% |
| Wicklow | 39,389 | 52.0% | 16,519 | 2,968 | 84.8% | 15.2% |
| Total | 1,783,604 | 50.7% | 721,003 | 133,430 | 84.4% | 15.6% |

== See also ==
- Politics of the Republic of Ireland
- History of the Republic of Ireland
- Constitutional amendment
- December 1972 Irish constitutional referendum
- Religion in the Republic of Ireland
