= Special position =

Special position may refer to:

- Geometric objects not being in general position, such as parallel lines
- The status of the Roman Catholic Church in Ireland, repealed in the Fifth Amendment of the Constitution of Ireland (1972)
