= Donegal West (Dáil constituency) =

Dáil constituency (1937–1961)

- Former Dáil constituency

Former constituency
- Created: 1937
- Abolished: 1961
- Seats: 3
- Local government area: County Donegal
- Replaced by: Donegal North-East; Donegal South-West

Donegal West was a parliamentary constituency represented in Dáil Éireann, the lower house of the Irish parliament or Oireachtas from 1937 to 1961. The constituency elected 3 deputies (Teachtaí Dála, commonly known as TDs) to the Dáil, on the system of proportional representation by means of the single transferable vote (PR-STV).

== History ==
The constituency was created under the Electoral (Revision of Constituencies) Act 1935, for the 1937 general election to Dáil Éireann. It succeeded the constituency of Donegal. It was abolished under the Electoral (Amendment) Act 1961, when it and Donegal East were replaced by the new constituencies of Donegal North-East and Donegal South-West.

== Boundaries ==
It consisted of the district electoral divisions of:

Annagry, Aran, Ardara, Ballintra (Ballyshannon), Ballintra, (Donegal), Ballyshannon Rural, Ballyshannon Urban, Binbane, Bonnyglen, Bundoran Rural, Carrickboy, Cavangarden, Cliff, Clogher, Corkermore, Cross Roads, Crovehy, Crowkeeragh, Crowarad, Dawros, Donegal, Doocharry, Dunfanaghy, Dungloe, Dunkineely, Dunlewy, Eanymore, Fintown, Glencolmcille, Glengesh, Glenleheen, Glenties, Gortahork, Graffy, Grousehall, Haugh, Inishkeel, Inver, Kilcar, Kilgoly, Killybegs, Laghey, Largymore, Lettermacward, Lough Eask, Maas, Magheraclogher, Maghery, Malin Beg, Meenaclady, Mountcharles, Mulmosog, Pettigo, Rutland, Tawnawully, Templecarn, Tieveskeelta, and Tullynaught,

and the Urban District of Bundoran in the administrative county of Donegal.

== TDs ==
Teachtaí Dála (TDs) for Donegal West 1937–1961
Key to parties: FF = Fianna Fáil; FG = Fine Gael
Dáil	Election	Deputy (Party)	Deputy (Party)	Deputy (Party)
9th	1937	Cormac Breslin (FF)	Brian Brady (FF)	Michael Óg McFadden (FG)
10th	1938	Cormac Breslin (FF)	Brian Brady (FF)	Michael Óg McFadden (FG)
11th	1943	Cormac Breslin (FF)	Brian Brady (FF)	Michael Óg McFadden (FG)
12th	1944	Cormac Breslin (FF)	Brian Brady (FF)	Michael Óg McFadden (FG)
13th	1948	Cormac Breslin (FF)	Brian Brady (FF)	Michael Óg McFadden (FG)
13th	1949 by-election	Cormac Breslin (FF)	Patrick O'Donnell (FG)	Michael Óg McFadden (FG)
14th	1951	Cormac Breslin (FF)	Patrick O'Donnell (FG)	Joseph Brennan (FF)
15th	1954	Cormac Breslin (FF)	Patrick O'Donnell (FG)	Joseph Brennan (FF)
16th	1957	Cormac Breslin (FF)	Patrick O'Donnell (FG)	Joseph Brennan (FF)
17th	1961	Constituency abolished. See Donegal North-East and Donegal South-West		

Note: The columns in this table are used only for presentational purposes, and no significance should be attached to the order of columns. For details of the order in which seats were won at each election, see the detailed results of that election.

== Elections ==
*: Outgoing TD

=== 1957 general election ===
1957 general election: Donegal West
Party	Candidate	FPv%	Count			
Party	Candidate	FPv%	1	2	3	4
Fine Gael	Patrick O'Donnell	27.7	6,208			
Fianna Fáil	Joseph Brennan	27.5	6,153			
Fianna Fáil	Cormac Breslin	16.6	3,711	3,743	4,228	4,525
Fianna Fáil	Seán Ó Cinnéide	15.9	3,560	3,606	3,652	3,841
Fine Gael	Robert Gardiner	12.3	2,759	3,291	3,315	
Electorate: 32,871 Valid: 22,391 Quota: 5,598 Turnout: 68.1%

=== 1954 general election ===
1954 general election: Donegal West
Party	Candidate	FPv%	Count	
Party	Candidate	FPv%	1	2
Fianna Fáil	Joseph Brennan	26.8	6,748	
Fine Gael	Patrick O'Donnell	25.2	6,338	
Fine Gael	John Barry	22.0	5,545	5,625
Fianna Fáil	Cormac Breslin	14.1	3,548	6,123
Fianna Fáil	Seán Kennedy	12.0	3,026	
Electorate: 34,018 Valid: 25,205 Quota: 6,302 Turnout: 74.1%

=== 1951 general election ===
1951 general election: Donegal West
Party	Candidate	FPv%	Count			
Party	Candidate	FPv%	1	2	3	4
Fianna Fáil	Joseph Brennan	29.8	8,023			
Fine Gael	Patrick O'Donnell	23.3	6,294	6,304	6,461	6,501
Fine Gael	Michael Óg McFadden	21.5	5,790	5,835	5,885	5,912
Fianna Fáil	Cormac Breslin	14.3	3,856	4,999	7,724	
Fianna Fáil	Seán Kennedy	11.2	3,008	3,090		
Electorate: 36,665 Valid: 26,971 Quota: 6,743 Turnout: 73.6%

=== 1949 by-election ===
Following the death of Fianna Fáil TD Brian Brady, a by-election was held on 16 November 1949. The seat was won by the Fine Gael candidate Patrick O'Donnell.

1949 by-election: Donegal West
Party	Candidate	FPv%	Count	
Party	Candidate	FPv%	1	2
Fianna Fáil	Joseph Brennan	47.4	12,700	12,863
Fine Gael	Patrick O'Donnell	42.1	11,256	13,634
Clann na Poblachta	Alphonsus Canning	10.5	2,812	
Electorate: 37,541 Valid: 26,768 Quota: 13,385 Turnout: 71.3%

=== 1948 general election ===
1948 general election: Donegal West
Party	Candidate	FPv%	Count			
Party	Candidate	FPv%	1	2	3	4
Fianna Fáil	Brian Brady	24.0	6,262	6,280	6,364	6,795
Fianna Fáil	Cormac Breslin	18.4	4,800	4,894	4,924	5,820
Fine Gael	Michael Óg McFadden	17.7	4,627	4,722	6,761	
Independent	Daniel C. Boyle	12.4	3,224	3,489	3,511	
Clann na Poblachta	Joseph McDevitt	9.8	2,546	4,278	4,401	5,044
Fine Gael	Christopher Gallagher	8.9	2,332	2,378		
Clann na Poblachta	Hugh Duggan	8.9	2,314			
Electorate: 37,662 Valid: 26,105 Quota: 6,527 Turnout: 69.3%

=== 1944 general election ===
1944 general election: Donegal West
Party	Candidate	FPv%	%	Seat	Count
Fianna Fáil	Brian Brady	Unopposed	N/A	1	
Fianna Fáil	Cormac Breslin	Unopposed	N/A	2	
Fine Gael	Michael Óg McFadden	Unopposed	N/A	3	
Electorate: 39,192 Valid: Quota: Turnout:

=== 1943 general election ===
1943 general election: Donegal West
Party	Candidate	FPv%	Count				
Party	Candidate	FPv%	1	2	3	4	5
Fine Gael	Michael Óg McFadden	26.4	6,873				
Fianna Fáil	Brian Brady	24.9	6,495	6,525			
Fianna Fáil	Cormac Breslin	21.4	5,581	5,596	5,602	5,720	5,871
Labour	Daniel Boyle	13.3	3,458	3,577	3,578	4,198	4,876
Clann na Talmhan	Hugh Callaghan	10.0	2,599	2,762	2,768	2,918	
Labour	Joseph Doherty	4.0	1,041	1,075	1,075		
Electorate: 39,192 Valid: 26,047 Quota: 6,512 Turnout: 66.5%

=== 1938 general election ===
1938 general election: Donegal West
Party	Candidate	FPv%	%	Seat	Count
Fianna Fáil	Brian Brady	Unopposed	N/A	1	
Fianna Fáil	Cormac Breslin	Unopposed	N/A	2	
Fine Gael	Michael Óg McFadden	Unopposed	N/A	3	
Electorate: 38,072 Valid: Quota: Turnout:

=== 1937 general election ===
1937 general election: Donegal West
Party	Candidate	FPv%	Count	
Party	Candidate	FPv%	1	2
Fianna Fáil	Brian Brady	28.9	7,833	
Fine Gael	Michael Óg McFadden	26.8	7,250	
Fianna Fáil	Cormac Breslin	23.3	6,311	7,354
Fine Gael	John O'Donnell	21.1	5,712	5,725
Electorate: 38,532 Valid: 27,106 Quota: 6,777 Turnout: 70.4%

== See also ==
- Dáil constituencies
- Politics of the Republic of Ireland
- Historic Dáil constituencies
- Elections in the Republic of Ireland
