= Michael Óg McFadden =

Irish politician (1885–1958)

Senator
- In office 14 August 1951 – 22 July 1954
- Constituency: Agricultural Panel

Teachta Dála
- In office July 1937 – May 1951
- Constituency: Donegal West
- In office January 1933 – July 1937
- In office June 1927 – February 1932
- Constituency: Donegal

Personal details
- Born: 1885 County Donegal, Ireland
- Died: 27 August 1958 (aged 72–73) County Donegal, Ireland
- Party: Fine Gael
- Other political affiliations: Cumann na nGaedheal

Michael Óg McFadden (1885 – 27 August 1958) was an Irish Fine Gael politician. A merchant and auctioneer, he was elected to Dáil Éireann as a Cumann na nGaedheal Teachta Dála (TD) for the Donegal constituency at the June 1927 general election. He was re-elected at the September 1927 general election but lost his seat at the 1932 general election.

He re-gained his seat at the 1933 general election and was re-elected at each subsequent election until he lost his seat again at the 1951 general election. From the 1937 general election, he was elected for the Donegal West constituency. At the 1951 Seanad election, he was elected to the 7th Seanad on the Agricultural Panel. He lost his seat at the 1954 Seanad election.

Dáil	Election	Deputy (Party)	Deputy (Party)	Deputy (Party)	Deputy (Party)	Deputy (Party)	Deputy (Party)	Deputy (Party)	Deputy (Party)
2nd	1921	Joseph O'Doherty (SF)	Samuel O'Flaherty (SF)	Patrick McGoldrick (SF)	Joseph McGinley (SF)	Joseph Sweeney (SF)	Peter Ward (SF)	6 seats 1921–1923	
3rd	1922	Joseph O'Doherty (AT-SF)	Samuel O'Flaherty (AT-SF)	Patrick McGoldrick (PT-SF)	Joseph McGinley (PT-SF)	Joseph Sweeney (PT-SF)	Peter Ward (PT-SF)	6 seats 1921–1923	
4th	1923	Joseph O'Doherty (Rep)	Peadar O'Donnell (Rep)	Patrick McGoldrick (CnaG)	Eugene Doherty (CnaG)	Patrick McFadden (CnaG)	Peter Ward (CnaG)	James Myles (Ind.)	John White (FP)
4th	1924 by-election	Joseph O'Doherty (Rep)	Peadar O'Donnell (Rep)	Patrick McGoldrick (CnaG)	Eugene Doherty (CnaG)	Patrick McFadden (CnaG)	Denis McCullough (CnaG)	James Myles (Ind.)	John White (FP)
5th	1927 (Jun)	Frank Carney (FF)	Neal Blaney (FF)	Daniel McMenamin (NL)	Eugene Doherty (CnaG)	Michael Óg McFadden (CnaG)	Hugh Law (CnaG)	James Myles (Ind.)	John White (FP)
6th	1927 (Sep)	Frank Carney (FF)	Neal Blaney (FF)	Archie Cassidy (Lab)	Eugene Doherty (CnaG)	Michael Óg McFadden (CnaG)	Hugh Law (CnaG)	James Myles (Ind.)	John White (FP)
7th	1932	Frank Carney (FF)	Neal Blaney (FF)	Brian Brady (FF)	Eugene Doherty (CnaG)	Daniel McMenamin (CnaG)	James Dillon (Ind.)	James Myles (Ind.)	John White (CnaG)
8th	1933	Joseph O'Doherty (FF)	Neal Blaney (FF)	Brian Brady (FF)	Hugh Doherty (FF)	Daniel McMenamin (CnaG)	James Dillon (NCP)	James Myles (Ind.)	Michael Óg McFadden (CnaG)
9th	1937	Constituency abolished. See Donegal East and Donegal West							

Dáil	Election	Deputy (Party)	Deputy (Party)	Deputy (Party)	Deputy (Party)	Deputy (Party)
21st	1977	Hugh Conaghan (FF)	Joseph Brennan (FF)	Neil Blaney (IFF)	James White (FG)	Paddy Harte (FG)
21st	1980 by-election	Hugh Conaghan (FF)	Clement Coughlan (FF)	Neil Blaney (IFF)	James White (FG)	Paddy Harte (FG)
22nd	1981	Constituency abolished. See Donegal North-East and Donegal South-West				

Dáil	Election	Deputy (Party)	Deputy (Party)	Deputy (Party)	Deputy (Party)	Deputy (Party)
32nd	2016	Pearse Doherty (SF)	Pat "the Cope" Gallagher (FF)	Thomas Pringle (Ind.)	Charlie McConalogue (FF)	Joe McHugh (FG)
33rd	2020	Pearse Doherty (SF)	Pádraig Mac Lochlainn (SF)	Thomas Pringle (Ind.)	Charlie McConalogue (FF)	Joe McHugh (FG)
34th	2024	Pearse Doherty (SF)	Pádraig Mac Lochlainn (SF)	Charles Ward (100%R)	Charlie McConalogue (FF)	Pat "the Cope" Gallagher (FF)

Dáil	Election	Deputy (Party)	Deputy (Party)	Deputy (Party)
9th	1937	Cormac Breslin (FF)	Brian Brady (FF)	Michael Óg McFadden (FG)
10th	1938	Cormac Breslin (FF)	Brian Brady (FF)	Michael Óg McFadden (FG)
11th	1943	Cormac Breslin (FF)	Brian Brady (FF)	Michael Óg McFadden (FG)
12th	1944	Cormac Breslin (FF)	Brian Brady (FF)	Michael Óg McFadden (FG)
13th	1948	Cormac Breslin (FF)	Brian Brady (FF)	Michael Óg McFadden (FG)
13th	1949 by-election	Cormac Breslin (FF)	Patrick O'Donnell (FG)	Michael Óg McFadden (FG)
14th	1951	Cormac Breslin (FF)	Patrick O'Donnell (FG)	Joseph Brennan (FF)
15th	1954	Cormac Breslin (FF)	Patrick O'Donnell (FG)	Joseph Brennan (FF)
16th	1957	Cormac Breslin (FF)	Patrick O'Donnell (FG)	Joseph Brennan (FF)
17th	1961	Constituency abolished. See Donegal North-East and Donegal South-West		
