= Patrick Hogan (Labour Party politician) =

Irish politician (1885–1969)

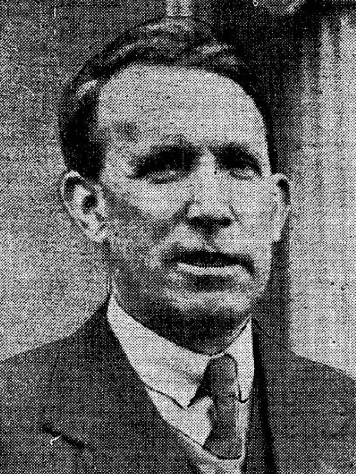
- Hogan in 1937

Ceann Comhairle of Dáil Éireann
- In office 13 June 1951 – 7 November 1967
- Deputy: Cormac Breslin
- Preceded by: Frank Fahy
- Succeeded by: Cormac Breslin

Leas-Cheann Comhairle of Dáil Éireann
- In office 25 February 1948 – 7 May 1951
- Ceann Comhairle: Frank Fahy
- Preceded by: Daniel McMenamin
- Succeeded by: Cormac Breslin
- In office 15 March 1932 – 27 May 1938
- Ceann Comhairle: Frank Fahy
- Preceded by: Daniel Morrissey
- Succeeded by: Fionán Lynch
- In office 27 October 1927 – 8 March 1928
- Ceann Comhairle: Michael Hayes
- Preceded by: James Dolan
- Succeeded by: Daniel Morrissey

Teachta Dála
- In office February 1948 – 24 January 1969
- In office June 1943 – May 1944
- In office August 1923 – June 1938
- Constituency: Clare

Senator
- In office 7 September 1938 – 23 June 1943
- Constituency: Labour Panel

Personal details
- Born: 10 October 1885 Kilmaley, County Clare, Ireland
- Died: 24 January 1969 (aged 83) Mullingar, County Westmeath, Ireland
- Party: Labour Party
- Spouse: Anne Mackey (m. 1923; died 1940)
- Children: 3
- Education: King's Inns

Patrick Hogan (10 October 1885 – 24 January 1969) was an Irish Labour Party politician who served as Ceann Comhairle of Dáil Éireann from 1951 to 1967 and Leas-Cheann Comhairle of Dáil Éireann from 1927 to 1928, 1932 to 1938 and 1948 to 1951. He served as a Teachta Dála (TD) for the Clare constituency from 1923 to 1938 and 1943 to 1969. He was a Senator for the Labour Panel from 1938 to 1943.

== Early life ==
Hogan was born on 10 October 1885, the only son of Patrick Hogan, a labourer, and Bridget O'Connor of Culleen, Kilmaley, County Clare. In the 1901 Census, his occupation is given as house-to-house postman.

When he entered the King's Inns in 1932, he gave his birth date as 8 October 1891.

== Political career ==
As a young man he joined Conradh na Gaeilge and the Irish Volunteers; however, he was deported to England for his activities. During the Irish War of Independence he fought against the Black and Tans in County Clare. After the Anglo-Irish Treaty he became an official with the Irish Transport and General Workers' Union (ITGWU). He was elected to Dáil Éireann as a Labour Party Teachta Dála (TD) for the Clare constituency in 1923. While sitting in the Dáil, he was called to the bar in 1936. He lost his seat at the 1938 general election, and was subsequently elected to the 3rd Seanad on the Labour Panel.

He remained in the Seanad until 1943 when he returned to the Dáil at the 1943 general election. He lost his Dáil seat again at the 1944 general election, but regained it at the 1948 general election. In 1951 he was elected as Ceann Comhairle, a position he held until his retirement in 1967. He welcomed United States President John F. Kennedy to the house on 28 June 1963 during his visit to Ireland.

He died in office on 24 January 1969. No by-election was held for his seat.

Political offices
Preceded by Frank Fahy	Ceann Comhairle of Dáil Éireann; 1951–1967	Succeeded by Cormac Breslin

Dáil	Election	Deputy (Party)	Deputy (Party)	Deputy (Party)	Deputy (Party)	Deputy (Party)
2nd	1921	Éamon de Valera (SF)	Brian O'Higgins (SF)	Seán Liddy (SF)	Patrick Brennan (SF)	4 seats 1921–1923
3rd	1922	Éamon de Valera (AT-SF)	Brian O'Higgins (AT-SF)	Seán Liddy (PT-SF)	Patrick Brennan (PT-SF)	4 seats 1921–1923
4th	1923	Éamon de Valera (Rep)	Brian O'Higgins (Rep)	Conor Hogan (FP)	Patrick Hogan (Lab)	Eoin MacNeill (CnaG)
5th	1927 (Jun)	Éamon de Valera (FF)	Patrick Houlihan (FF)	Thomas Falvey (FP)	Patrick Hogan (Lab)	Patrick Kelly (CnaG)
6th	1927 (Sep)	Éamon de Valera (FF)	Patrick Houlihan (FF)	Martin Sexton (FF)	Patrick Hogan (Lab)	Patrick Kelly (CnaG)
7th	1932	Éamon de Valera (FF)	Seán O'Grady (FF)	Martin Sexton (FF)	Patrick Hogan (Lab)	Patrick Burke (CnaG)
8th	1933	Éamon de Valera (FF)	Seán O'Grady (FF)	Patrick Houlihan (FF)	Patrick Hogan (Lab)	Patrick Burke (CnaG)
9th	1937	Éamon de Valera (FF)	Seán O'Grady (FF)	Thomas Burke (FP)	Patrick Hogan (Lab)	Patrick Burke (FG)
10th	1938	Éamon de Valera (FF)	Seán O'Grady (FF)	Thomas Burke (FP)	Peter O'Loghlen (FF)	Patrick Burke (FG)
11th	1943	Éamon de Valera (FF)	Seán O'Grady (FF)	Thomas Burke (FP)	Patrick Hogan (Lab)	Patrick Burke (FG)
12th	1944	Éamon de Valera (FF)	Seán O'Grady (FF)	Thomas Burke (FP)	Peter O'Loghlen (FF)	Patrick Burke (FG)
12th	1945 by-election	Éamon de Valera (FF)	Seán O'Grady (FF)	Thomas Burke (FP)	Peter O'Loghlen (FF)	Patrick Shanahan (FF)
13th	1948	Éamon de Valera (FF)	Seán O'Grady (FF)	Thomas Burke (FP)	Patrick Hogan (Lab)	4 seats 1948–1969
14th	1951	Éamon de Valera (FF)	Patrick Hillery (FF)	William Murphy (FG)	Patrick Hogan (Lab)	4 seats 1948–1969
15th	1954	Éamon de Valera (FF)	Patrick Hillery (FF)	William Murphy (FG)	Patrick Hogan (Lab)	4 seats 1948–1969
16th	1957	Éamon de Valera (FF)	Patrick Hillery (FF)	William Murphy (FG)	Patrick Hogan (Lab)	4 seats 1948–1969
16th	1959 by-election	Seán Ó Ceallaigh (FF)	Patrick Hillery (FF)	William Murphy (FG)	Patrick Hogan (Lab)	4 seats 1948–1969
17th	1961	Seán Ó Ceallaigh (FF)	Patrick Hillery (FF)	William Murphy (FG)	Patrick Hogan (Lab)	4 seats 1948–1969
18th	1965	Seán Ó Ceallaigh (FF)	Patrick Hillery (FF)	William Murphy (FG)	Patrick Hogan (Lab)	4 seats 1948–1969
18th	1968 by-election	Seán Ó Ceallaigh (FF)	Patrick Hillery (FF)	Sylvester Barrett (FF)	Patrick Hogan (Lab)	4 seats 1948–1969
19th	1969	Frank Taylor (FG)	Patrick Hillery (FF)	Sylvester Barrett (FF)	3 seats 1969–1981	
20th	1973	Frank Taylor (FG)	Brendan Daly (FF)	Sylvester Barrett (FF)	3 seats 1969–1981	
21st	1977	Frank Taylor (FG)	Brendan Daly (FF)	Sylvester Barrett (FF)	3 seats 1969–1981	
22nd	1981	Madeleine Taylor (FG)	Brendan Daly (FF)	Sylvester Barrett (FF)	Bill Loughnane (FF)	4 seats since 1981
23rd	1982 (Feb)	Donal Carey (FG)	Brendan Daly (FF)	Sylvester Barrett (FF)	Bill Loughnane (FF)	4 seats since 1981
24th	1982 (Nov)	Donal Carey (FG)	Brendan Daly (FF)	Sylvester Barrett (FF)	Madeleine Taylor-Quinn (FG)	4 seats since 1981
25th	1987	Donal Carey (FG)	Brendan Daly (FF)	Síle de Valera (FF)	Madeleine Taylor-Quinn (FG)	4 seats since 1981
26th	1989	Donal Carey (FG)	Brendan Daly (FF)	Síle de Valera (FF)	Madeleine Taylor-Quinn (FG)	4 seats since 1981
27th	1992	Donal Carey (FG)	Moosajee Bhamjee (Lab)	Síle de Valera (FF)	Tony Killeen (FF)	4 seats since 1981
28th	1997	Donal Carey (FG)	Brendan Daly (FF)	Síle de Valera (FF)	Tony Killeen (FF)	4 seats since 1981
29th	2002	Pat Breen (FG)	James Breen (Ind.)	Síle de Valera (FF)	Tony Killeen (FF)	4 seats since 1981
30th	2007	Pat Breen (FG)	Joe Carey (FG)	Timmy Dooley (FF)	Tony Killeen (FF)	4 seats since 1981
31st	2011	Pat Breen (FG)	Joe Carey (FG)	Timmy Dooley (FF)	Michael McNamara (Lab)	4 seats since 1981
32nd	2016	Pat Breen (FG)	Joe Carey (FG)	Timmy Dooley (FF)	Michael Harty (Ind.)	4 seats since 1981
33rd	2020	Violet-Anne Wynne (SF)	Joe Carey (FG)	Cathal Crowe (FF)	Michael McNamara (Ind.)	4 seats since 1981
34th	2024	Donna McGettigan (SF)	Joe Cooney (FG)	Cathal Crowe (FF)	Timmy Dooley (FF)	4 seats since 1981
