= Cormac Breslin =

Irish politician (1902–1978)

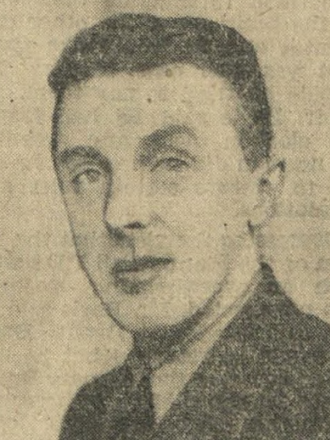
- Breslin in 1943

Ceann Comhairle of Dáil Éireann
- In office 7 November 1967 – 14 March 1973
- Deputy: Denis Jones
- Preceded by: Patrick Hogan
- Succeeded by: Seán Treacy

Leas-Cheann Comhairle of Dáil Éireann
- In office 4 July 1951 – 7 November 1967
- Ceann Comhairle: Patrick Hogan
- Preceded by: Patrick Hogan
- Succeeded by: Denis Jones

Teachta Dála
- In office June 1969 – June 1977
- Constituency: Donegal–Leitrim
- In office October 1961 – June 1969
- Constituency: Donegal South-West
- In office July 1937 – October 1961
- Constituency: Donegal West

Personal details
- Born: 25 April 1902 Gweedore, County Donegal, Ireland
- Died: 23 January 1978 (aged 75) Letterkenny, County Donegal, Ireland
- Party: Fianna Fáil
- Spouse: Antoinnette Wilman (m. 1923)
- Children: 10
- Education: St Eunan's College

Cormac Michael Breslin (25 April 1902 – 23 January 1978) was an Irish Fianna Fáil politician who served as Ceann Comhairle of Dáil Éireann from 1967 to 1973. He served as a Teachta Dála (TD) from 1937 to 1977.

He was born in Bunbeg, Gweedore, County Donegal. He was educated at St Eunan's College, Letterkenny and, while Leas-Cheann Comhairle, attended the Golden Jubilee there in September 1956.

He was first elected to Dáil Éireann as a Fianna Fáil Teachta Dála (TD) for the Donegal West constituency at the 1937 general election. He was re-elected at every election until his retirement in 1977, switching constituency to Donegal South-West in 1961 and to Donegal–Leitrim in 1969. He served as Ceann Comhairle of Dáil Éireann from 1967 to 1973, and as Leas-Cheann Comhairle from 1951 to 1967. He is credited for helping found the industrial estate in Gweedore, and also the turf burning station—a source of employment in his local parish, which allowed local people to cut the turbary and sell it to the station operated by the Electrical Supply Board (ESB), situated in Min a Cuing.

In November 1931 he married Antoinette Wilman, and they had ten children.

Political offices
Preceded by Patrick Hogan	Ceann Comhairle of Dáil Éireann; 1967–1973	Succeeded by Seán Treacy

Dáil	Election	Deputy (Party)	Deputy (Party)	Deputy (Party)
9th	1937	Cormac Breslin (FF)	Brian Brady (FF)	Michael Óg McFadden (FG)
10th	1938	Cormac Breslin (FF)	Brian Brady (FF)	Michael Óg McFadden (FG)
11th	1943	Cormac Breslin (FF)	Brian Brady (FF)	Michael Óg McFadden (FG)
12th	1944	Cormac Breslin (FF)	Brian Brady (FF)	Michael Óg McFadden (FG)
13th	1948	Cormac Breslin (FF)	Brian Brady (FF)	Michael Óg McFadden (FG)
13th	1949 by-election	Cormac Breslin (FF)	Patrick O'Donnell (FG)	Michael Óg McFadden (FG)
14th	1951	Cormac Breslin (FF)	Patrick O'Donnell (FG)	Joseph Brennan (FF)
15th	1954	Cormac Breslin (FF)	Patrick O'Donnell (FG)	Joseph Brennan (FF)
16th	1957	Cormac Breslin (FF)	Patrick O'Donnell (FG)	Joseph Brennan (FF)
17th	1961	Constituency abolished. See Donegal North-East and Donegal South-West		

Dáil	Election	Deputy (Party)	Deputy (Party)	Deputy (Party)
17th	1961	Joseph Brennan (FF)	Cormac Breslin (FF)	Patrick O'Donnell (FG)
18th	1965	Joseph Brennan (FF)	Cormac Breslin (FF)	Patrick O'Donnell (FG)
19th	1969	Constituency abolished. See Donegal–Leitrim		

Dáil	Election	Deputy (Party)	Deputy (Party)	Deputy (Party)
22nd	1981	Pat "the Cope" Gallagher (FF)	Clement Coughlan (FF)	James White (FG)
23rd	1982 (Feb)	Pat "the Cope" Gallagher (FF)	Clement Coughlan (FF)	Dinny McGinley (FG)
24th	1982 (Nov)	Pat "the Cope" Gallagher (FF)	Clement Coughlan (FF)	Dinny McGinley (FG)
24th	1983 by-election	Pat "the Cope" Gallagher (FF)	Cathal Coughlan (FF)	Dinny McGinley (FG)
25th	1987	Pat "the Cope" Gallagher (FF)	Mary Coughlan (FF)	Dinny McGinley (FG)
26th	1989	Pat "the Cope" Gallagher (FF)	Mary Coughlan (FF)	Dinny McGinley (FG)
27th	1992	Pat "the Cope" Gallagher (FF)	Mary Coughlan (FF)	Dinny McGinley (FG)
28th	1997	Tom Gildea (Ind.)	Mary Coughlan (FF)	Dinny McGinley (FG)
29th	2002	Pat "the Cope" Gallagher (FF)	Mary Coughlan (FF)	Dinny McGinley (FG)
30th	2007	Pat "the Cope" Gallagher (FF)	Mary Coughlan (FF)	Dinny McGinley (FG)
30th	2010 by-election	Pearse Doherty (SF)	Mary Coughlan (FF)	Dinny McGinley (FG)
31st	2011	Pearse Doherty (SF)	Thomas Pringle (Ind.)	Dinny McGinley (FG)
32nd	2016	Constituency abolished. See Donegal		

Dáil	Election	Deputy (Party)	Deputy (Party)	Deputy (Party)
19th	1969	Cormac Breslin (Note: Breslin was Ceann Comhairle from 1967 to 1973. As outgoing Ceann Comhairle, he was automatically re-elected at the 1969 and 1973 general elections.) (FF)	Joseph Brennan (FF)	Patrick O'Donnell (FG)
19th	1970 by-election	Cormac Breslin (FF)	Joseph Brennan (FF)	Patrick Delap (FF)
20th	1973	Cormac Breslin (FF)	Joseph Brennan (FF)	James White (FG)
21st	1977	Constituency abolished. See Donegal and Sligo–Leitrim		
