= Brian Brady =

Irish politician (1903–1949)

Teachta Dála
- In office July 1937 – 10 September 1949
- Constituency: Donegal West
- In office February 1932 – July 1937
- Constituency: Donegal

Personal details
- Born: Bernard Myles Brady; 29 March 1903 Killybegs, County Donegal, Ireland
- Died: 10 September 1949 (aged 46) Dublin, Ireland
- Party: Fianna Fáil
- Spouse: Rose Conwell

Brian Myles Brady (29 March 1903 – 10 September 1949) was a revolutionary and Irish Fianna Fáil politician.

== Early life and revolutionary period ==
Born Bernard Myles Brady to Myles Brady, merchant, and Sarah Murrin of Killybegs. Brady was active with A Company (Killybegs), 2 Battalion, 3 Donegal Brigade, Irish Republican Army (IRA) during the Irish War of Independence He took part in several attacks on barracks, ambushes of British forces and raids.

Taking the anti-Treaty side in the Irish Civil War, Brady joined 3 Donegal Brigade's IRA 'Flying Column' and was involved in attacks on National forces. He was arrested in February 1923 and interned until November 1923. Brady was later awarded a pension by the Irish government under the Military Service Pensions Act, 1934 for his service with the IRA between 1919 and 1923.

== Politics ==
He represented Donegal and Donegal West in Dáil Éireann as a member of Fianna Fáil from 1932 until his death in 1949. Following his death, a by-election was held on 16 November 1949, the seat was won by the Fine Gael candidate Patrick O'Donnell.

Dáil	Election	Deputy (Party)	Deputy (Party)	Deputy (Party)	Deputy (Party)	Deputy (Party)	Deputy (Party)	Deputy (Party)	Deputy (Party)
2nd	1921	Joseph O'Doherty (SF)	Samuel O'Flaherty (SF)	Patrick McGoldrick (SF)	Joseph McGinley (SF)	Joseph Sweeney (SF)	Peter Ward (SF)	6 seats 1921–1923	
3rd	1922	Joseph O'Doherty (AT-SF)	Samuel O'Flaherty (AT-SF)	Patrick McGoldrick (PT-SF)	Joseph McGinley (PT-SF)	Joseph Sweeney (PT-SF)	Peter Ward (PT-SF)	6 seats 1921–1923	
4th	1923	Joseph O'Doherty (Rep)	Peadar O'Donnell (Rep)	Patrick McGoldrick (CnaG)	Eugene Doherty (CnaG)	Patrick McFadden (CnaG)	Peter Ward (CnaG)	James Myles (Ind.)	John White (FP)
4th	1924 by-election	Joseph O'Doherty (Rep)	Peadar O'Donnell (Rep)	Patrick McGoldrick (CnaG)	Eugene Doherty (CnaG)	Patrick McFadden (CnaG)	Denis McCullough (CnaG)	James Myles (Ind.)	John White (FP)
5th	1927 (Jun)	Frank Carney (FF)	Neal Blaney (FF)	Daniel McMenamin (NL)	Eugene Doherty (CnaG)	Michael Óg McFadden (CnaG)	Hugh Law (CnaG)	James Myles (Ind.)	John White (FP)
6th	1927 (Sep)	Frank Carney (FF)	Neal Blaney (FF)	Archie Cassidy (Lab)	Eugene Doherty (CnaG)	Michael Óg McFadden (CnaG)	Hugh Law (CnaG)	James Myles (Ind.)	John White (FP)
7th	1932	Frank Carney (FF)	Neal Blaney (FF)	Brian Brady (FF)	Eugene Doherty (CnaG)	Daniel McMenamin (CnaG)	James Dillon (Ind.)	James Myles (Ind.)	John White (CnaG)
8th	1933	Joseph O'Doherty (FF)	Neal Blaney (FF)	Brian Brady (FF)	Hugh Doherty (FF)	Daniel McMenamin (CnaG)	James Dillon (NCP)	James Myles (Ind.)	Michael Óg McFadden (CnaG)
9th	1937	Constituency abolished. See Donegal East and Donegal West							

Dáil	Election	Deputy (Party)	Deputy (Party)	Deputy (Party)	Deputy (Party)	Deputy (Party)
21st	1977	Hugh Conaghan (FF)	Joseph Brennan (FF)	Neil Blaney (IFF)	James White (FG)	Paddy Harte (FG)
21st	1980 by-election	Hugh Conaghan (FF)	Clement Coughlan (FF)	Neil Blaney (IFF)	James White (FG)	Paddy Harte (FG)
22nd	1981	Constituency abolished. See Donegal North-East and Donegal South-West				

Dáil	Election	Deputy (Party)	Deputy (Party)	Deputy (Party)	Deputy (Party)	Deputy (Party)
32nd	2016	Pearse Doherty (SF)	Pat "the Cope" Gallagher (FF)	Thomas Pringle (Ind.)	Charlie McConalogue (FF)	Joe McHugh (FG)
33rd	2020	Pearse Doherty (SF)	Pádraig Mac Lochlainn (SF)	Thomas Pringle (Ind.)	Charlie McConalogue (FF)	Joe McHugh (FG)
34th	2024	Pearse Doherty (SF)	Pádraig Mac Lochlainn (SF)	Charles Ward (100%R)	Charlie McConalogue (FF)	Pat "the Cope" Gallagher (FF)

Dáil	Election	Deputy (Party)	Deputy (Party)	Deputy (Party)
9th	1937	Cormac Breslin (FF)	Brian Brady (FF)	Michael Óg McFadden (FG)
10th	1938	Cormac Breslin (FF)	Brian Brady (FF)	Michael Óg McFadden (FG)
11th	1943	Cormac Breslin (FF)	Brian Brady (FF)	Michael Óg McFadden (FG)
12th	1944	Cormac Breslin (FF)	Brian Brady (FF)	Michael Óg McFadden (FG)
13th	1948	Cormac Breslin (FF)	Brian Brady (FF)	Michael Óg McFadden (FG)
13th	1949 by-election	Cormac Breslin (FF)	Patrick O'Donnell (FG)	Michael Óg McFadden (FG)
14th	1951	Cormac Breslin (FF)	Patrick O'Donnell (FG)	Joseph Brennan (FF)
15th	1954	Cormac Breslin (FF)	Patrick O'Donnell (FG)	Joseph Brennan (FF)
16th	1957	Cormac Breslin (FF)	Patrick O'Donnell (FG)	Joseph Brennan (FF)
17th	1961	Constituency abolished. See Donegal North-East and Donegal South-West		
