= James White (Irish politician) =

Irish politician and businessman (1938–2014)

Teachta Dála
- In office June 1981 – February 1982
- Constituency: Donegal South-West
- In office June 1977 – June 1981
- Constituency: Donegal
- In office February 1973 – June 1977
- Constituency: Donegal–Leitrim

Personal details
- Born: 2 January 1938 County Donegal, Ireland
- Died: 2 September 2014 (aged 76) County Donegal, Ireland
- Party: Fine Gael

James White (2 January 1938 – 2 September 2014) was an Irish businessman and hotelier, and a Fine Gael Teachta Dála (TD) for constituencies in County Donegal.

He was elected to Dáil Éireann as Fine Gael TD for the Donegal–Leitrim constituency at the 1973 general election. He was re-elected at the 1977 general election as the TD for the new Donegal constituency. After further boundary changes, he was re-elected at the 1981 general election as the TD for Donegal South-West, and did not contest the February 1982 general election. He stood again for Donegal South-West at the 1992 and 2002 general elections but was not elected on either occasion.

His Ballyshannon-based company, the White's Hotel Group, owns several large hotels in the spa town of Lisdoonvarna, County Clare, renowned for its annual matchmaking festival.

He died on 2 September 2014.

Dáil	Election	Deputy (Party)	Deputy (Party)	Deputy (Party)
19th	1969	Cormac Breslin (Note: Breslin was Ceann Comhairle from 1967 to 1973. As outgoing Ceann Comhairle, he was automatically re-elected at the 1969 and 1973 general elections.) (FF)	Joseph Brennan (FF)	Patrick O'Donnell (FG)
19th	1970 by-election	Cormac Breslin (FF)	Joseph Brennan (FF)	Patrick Delap (FF)
20th	1973	Cormac Breslin (FF)	Joseph Brennan (FF)	James White (FG)
21st	1977	Constituency abolished. See Donegal and Sligo–Leitrim		

Dáil	Election	Deputy (Party)	Deputy (Party)	Deputy (Party)	Deputy (Party)	Deputy (Party)	Deputy (Party)	Deputy (Party)	Deputy (Party)
2nd	1921	Joseph O'Doherty (SF)	Samuel O'Flaherty (SF)	Patrick McGoldrick (SF)	Joseph McGinley (SF)	Joseph Sweeney (SF)	Peter Ward (SF)	6 seats 1921–1923	
3rd	1922	Joseph O'Doherty (AT-SF)	Samuel O'Flaherty (AT-SF)	Patrick McGoldrick (PT-SF)	Joseph McGinley (PT-SF)	Joseph Sweeney (PT-SF)	Peter Ward (PT-SF)	6 seats 1921–1923	
4th	1923	Joseph O'Doherty (Rep)	Peadar O'Donnell (Rep)	Patrick McGoldrick (CnaG)	Eugene Doherty (CnaG)	Patrick McFadden (CnaG)	Peter Ward (CnaG)	James Myles (Ind.)	John White (FP)
4th	1924 by-election	Joseph O'Doherty (Rep)	Peadar O'Donnell (Rep)	Patrick McGoldrick (CnaG)	Eugene Doherty (CnaG)	Patrick McFadden (CnaG)	Denis McCullough (CnaG)	James Myles (Ind.)	John White (FP)
5th	1927 (Jun)	Frank Carney (FF)	Neal Blaney (FF)	Daniel McMenamin (NL)	Eugene Doherty (CnaG)	Michael Óg McFadden (CnaG)	Hugh Law (CnaG)	James Myles (Ind.)	John White (FP)
6th	1927 (Sep)	Frank Carney (FF)	Neal Blaney (FF)	Archie Cassidy (Lab)	Eugene Doherty (CnaG)	Michael Óg McFadden (CnaG)	Hugh Law (CnaG)	James Myles (Ind.)	John White (FP)
7th	1932	Frank Carney (FF)	Neal Blaney (FF)	Brian Brady (FF)	Eugene Doherty (CnaG)	Daniel McMenamin (CnaG)	James Dillon (Ind.)	James Myles (Ind.)	John White (CnaG)
8th	1933	Joseph O'Doherty (FF)	Neal Blaney (FF)	Brian Brady (FF)	Hugh Doherty (FF)	Daniel McMenamin (CnaG)	James Dillon (NCP)	James Myles (Ind.)	Michael Óg McFadden (CnaG)
9th	1937	Constituency abolished. See Donegal East and Donegal West							

Dáil	Election	Deputy (Party)	Deputy (Party)	Deputy (Party)	Deputy (Party)	Deputy (Party)
21st	1977	Hugh Conaghan (FF)	Joseph Brennan (FF)	Neil Blaney (IFF)	James White (FG)	Paddy Harte (FG)
21st	1980 by-election	Hugh Conaghan (FF)	Clement Coughlan (FF)	Neil Blaney (IFF)	James White (FG)	Paddy Harte (FG)
22nd	1981	Constituency abolished. See Donegal North-East and Donegal South-West				

Dáil	Election	Deputy (Party)	Deputy (Party)	Deputy (Party)	Deputy (Party)	Deputy (Party)
32nd	2016	Pearse Doherty (SF)	Pat "the Cope" Gallagher (FF)	Thomas Pringle (Ind.)	Charlie McConalogue (FF)	Joe McHugh (FG)
33rd	2020	Pearse Doherty (SF)	Pádraig Mac Lochlainn (SF)	Thomas Pringle (Ind.)	Charlie McConalogue (FF)	Joe McHugh (FG)
34th	2024	Pearse Doherty (SF)	Pádraig Mac Lochlainn (SF)	Charles Ward (100%R)	Charlie McConalogue (FF)	Pat "the Cope" Gallagher (FF)

Dáil	Election	Deputy (Party)	Deputy (Party)	Deputy (Party)
17th	1961	Joseph Brennan (FF)	Cormac Breslin (FF)	Patrick O'Donnell (FG)
18th	1965	Joseph Brennan (FF)	Cormac Breslin (FF)	Patrick O'Donnell (FG)
19th	1969	Constituency abolished. See Donegal–Leitrim		

Dáil	Election	Deputy (Party)	Deputy (Party)	Deputy (Party)
22nd	1981	Pat "the Cope" Gallagher (FF)	Clement Coughlan (FF)	James White (FG)
23rd	1982 (Feb)	Pat "the Cope" Gallagher (FF)	Clement Coughlan (FF)	Dinny McGinley (FG)
24th	1982 (Nov)	Pat "the Cope" Gallagher (FF)	Clement Coughlan (FF)	Dinny McGinley (FG)
24th	1983 by-election	Pat "the Cope" Gallagher (FF)	Cathal Coughlan (FF)	Dinny McGinley (FG)
25th	1987	Pat "the Cope" Gallagher (FF)	Mary Coughlan (FF)	Dinny McGinley (FG)
26th	1989	Pat "the Cope" Gallagher (FF)	Mary Coughlan (FF)	Dinny McGinley (FG)
27th	1992	Pat "the Cope" Gallagher (FF)	Mary Coughlan (FF)	Dinny McGinley (FG)
28th	1997	Tom Gildea (Ind.)	Mary Coughlan (FF)	Dinny McGinley (FG)
29th	2002	Pat "the Cope" Gallagher (FF)	Mary Coughlan (FF)	Dinny McGinley (FG)
30th	2007	Pat "the Cope" Gallagher (FF)	Mary Coughlan (FF)	Dinny McGinley (FG)
30th	2010 by-election	Pearse Doherty (SF)	Mary Coughlan (FF)	Dinny McGinley (FG)
31st	2011	Pearse Doherty (SF)	Thomas Pringle (Ind.)	Dinny McGinley (FG)
32nd	2016	Constituency abolished. See Donegal		
