= Patrick O'Donnell (Irish politician) =

Irish politician (died 1970)

Minister for Local Government
- In office 2 June 1954 – 20 March 1957
- Taoiseach: John A. Costello
- Preceded by: Paddy Smith
- Succeeded by: Paddy Smith

Teachta Dála
- In office June 1969 – 4 October 1970
- Constituency: Donegal–Leitrim
- In office October 1961 – June 1969
- Constituency: Donegal South-West
- In office November 1949 – October 1961
- Constituency: Donegal West

Personal details
- Born: 21 August 1907 County Meath, Ireland
- Died: 4 October 1970 (aged 63) Dublin, Ireland
- Party: Fine Gael
- Spouse: Joan O'Donnell
- Children: 4
- Education: University College Dublin

Patrick A. O'Donnell (21 August 1907 – 4 October 1970) was an Irish Fine Gael politician and Teachta Dála (TD) for over twenty years.

He was born on 21 August 1907 in County Meath to James F. O'Donnell, a hotelier, of Burtonport, County Donegal, and Bridget O'Donnell (née McDonnell). Raised in Burtonport, O'Donnell was educated at national schools in Meenmore and Meenamara, and at St Eunan's College in Letterkenny.

He studied for a time at University College Dublin, and qualified as a solicitor in 1930, serving his apprenticeship with a firm in Ballybofey, County Donegal. He established his own practice in Dungloe, which became one of the largest and most successful in Ireland, with extensive business throughout counties Donegal, Sligo, and Leitrim.

While serving as Minister for Local Government, he attended the St Eunan's College Golden Jubilee in September 1956. He was a member of Donegal County Council from 1959 to 1970.

He was first elected to Dáil Éireann on 16 November 1949 for the Donegal West constituency, in a by-election caused by the death of Fianna Fáil TD Brian Brady. He was re-elected at the 1951 general election and retained his Dáil seat until his death in 1970. O'Donnell was also a member of cabinet, serving as Minister for Local Government in the Second Inter-Party Government under Taoiseach John A. Costello. He was the first Donegal deputy ever to serve in cabinet.

O'Donnell dies on 4 October 1970, at the age of 63.

Political offices
Preceded by Paddy Smith	Minister for Local Government; 1954–1957	Succeeded by Paddy Smith

Dáil	Election	Deputy (Party)	Deputy (Party)	Deputy (Party)
9th	1937	Cormac Breslin (FF)	Brian Brady (FF)	Michael Óg McFadden (FG)
10th	1938	Cormac Breslin (FF)	Brian Brady (FF)	Michael Óg McFadden (FG)
11th	1943	Cormac Breslin (FF)	Brian Brady (FF)	Michael Óg McFadden (FG)
12th	1944	Cormac Breslin (FF)	Brian Brady (FF)	Michael Óg McFadden (FG)
13th	1948	Cormac Breslin (FF)	Brian Brady (FF)	Michael Óg McFadden (FG)
13th	1949 by-election	Cormac Breslin (FF)	Patrick O'Donnell (FG)	Michael Óg McFadden (FG)
14th	1951	Cormac Breslin (FF)	Patrick O'Donnell (FG)	Joseph Brennan (FF)
15th	1954	Cormac Breslin (FF)	Patrick O'Donnell (FG)	Joseph Brennan (FF)
16th	1957	Cormac Breslin (FF)	Patrick O'Donnell (FG)	Joseph Brennan (FF)
17th	1961	Constituency abolished. See Donegal North-East and Donegal South-West		

Dáil	Election	Deputy (Party)	Deputy (Party)	Deputy (Party)
17th	1961	Joseph Brennan (FF)	Cormac Breslin (FF)	Patrick O'Donnell (FG)
18th	1965	Joseph Brennan (FF)	Cormac Breslin (FF)	Patrick O'Donnell (FG)
19th	1969	Constituency abolished. See Donegal–Leitrim		

Dáil	Election	Deputy (Party)	Deputy (Party)	Deputy (Party)
22nd	1981	Pat "the Cope" Gallagher (FF)	Clement Coughlan (FF)	James White (FG)
23rd	1982 (Feb)	Pat "the Cope" Gallagher (FF)	Clement Coughlan (FF)	Dinny McGinley (FG)
24th	1982 (Nov)	Pat "the Cope" Gallagher (FF)	Clement Coughlan (FF)	Dinny McGinley (FG)
24th	1983 by-election	Pat "the Cope" Gallagher (FF)	Cathal Coughlan (FF)	Dinny McGinley (FG)
25th	1987	Pat "the Cope" Gallagher (FF)	Mary Coughlan (FF)	Dinny McGinley (FG)
26th	1989	Pat "the Cope" Gallagher (FF)	Mary Coughlan (FF)	Dinny McGinley (FG)
27th	1992	Pat "the Cope" Gallagher (FF)	Mary Coughlan (FF)	Dinny McGinley (FG)
28th	1997	Tom Gildea (Ind.)	Mary Coughlan (FF)	Dinny McGinley (FG)
29th	2002	Pat "the Cope" Gallagher (FF)	Mary Coughlan (FF)	Dinny McGinley (FG)
30th	2007	Pat "the Cope" Gallagher (FF)	Mary Coughlan (FF)	Dinny McGinley (FG)
30th	2010 by-election	Pearse Doherty (SF)	Mary Coughlan (FF)	Dinny McGinley (FG)
31st	2011	Pearse Doherty (SF)	Thomas Pringle (Ind.)	Dinny McGinley (FG)
32nd	2016	Constituency abolished. See Donegal		

Dáil	Election	Deputy (Party)	Deputy (Party)	Deputy (Party)
19th	1969	Cormac Breslin (Note: Breslin was Ceann Comhairle from 1967 to 1973. As outgoing Ceann Comhairle, he was automatically re-elected at the 1969 and 1973 general elections.) (FF)	Joseph Brennan (FF)	Patrick O'Donnell (FG)
19th	1970 by-election	Cormac Breslin (FF)	Joseph Brennan (FF)	Patrick Delap (FF)
20th	1973	Cormac Breslin (FF)	Joseph Brennan (FF)	James White (FG)
21st	1977	Constituency abolished. See Donegal and Sligo–Leitrim		
