= Donegal–Leitrim =

Dáil constituency (1969–1977)

- Former Dáil constituency

Former constituency
- Created: 1969
- Abolished: 1977
- Seats: 3
- Local government areas: County Donegal; County Leitrim
- Created from: Donegal South-West; Sligo–Leitrim
- Replaced by: Donegal; Sligo–Leitrim

Donegal–Leitrim was a parliamentary constituency represented in Dáil Éireann, the lower house of the Irish parliament or Oireachtas from 1969 to 1977. The constituency elected 3 deputies (Teachtaí Dála, commonly known as TDs) to the Dáil, on the system of proportional representation by means of the single transferable vote (PR-STV).

== History and boundaries ==
The constituency was created under the Electoral (Amendment) Act 1969, and first used at the 1969 general election to the 19th Dáil. It was used again for the 1973 general election to the 20th Dáil.

The constituency was used for one electoral revision only, being abolished under the Electoral (Amendment) Act 1974. The areas in County Donegal were mostly incorporated into the new Donegal constituency, while the more northerly Leitrim territories and the southern area of Donegal (around Bundoran and Ballyshannon), were incorporated into the substantially revised Sligo–Leitrim constituency.

It was defined in the 1969 Act as:

"In the administrative county of Donegal, the district electoral divisions of:

Ballintra, Ballyshannon Rural, Ballyshannon Urban, Bundoran Rural, Carrickboy, Cavangarden, Cliff, in the former Rural District of Ballyshannon;

Ballintra, Binbane, Bonnyglen, Clogher, Corkemore, Donegal, Dunkineely, Eanymore, Grousehall, Haugh, Inver, Laghy, Lough Eask, Pettigoe. Tantallon Tawnawully, Templecarn, Tullynaught, in the former Rural District of Donegal;

Magheraclogher (with the exception of the townland of Glentornan), Meenaclalp in the former Rural District of Dunfanaghy.

Annagary, Aran, Ardara, Crovehy, Crowkeeragh, Crownarad, Dawros, Doocharry, Dunglo, Fintown, Glencolmcille, Glengesh, Glenleheen, Glenties, Graffy, Inishkeel Kilcar, Kilgoly, Killybegs, Largymore, Letter macaward, Maas, Maghery, Malin Beg, Mulmosog, Rutland, Tieveskeelta, in the former Rural District of Glenties;

Altnapaste, Castlefinn, Cloghan, Cloghard Convoy (with the exception of the townlands of Aughagault, Aughagault Big, Breen, Drumkeen, Mullaghfin, Stralongford, Treantaboy), Dooish, Gleneely, Goland, Killygordon, Knock, Stranorlar, Urney West, and the townlands of:

Aghawee, Ardnaglass, Ballybogan, Camus, Churchtown, Gortin South, Gortnavilly, Legnabraid, Tirkeeran, Untshinagh Lower, Unshinagh Upper, in the district electoral division of Clondeigh South; Ardvarnock Glebe, Deerpark, Flemingstown, Kiltole Tullydonnell Lower, Tullydonnell Upper, in the district electoral division of Figart; in the former Rural District of Stranorlar;

and the urban district of Bundoran;

and, in the administrative county of Leitrim, the district electoral divisions of:

Aghalateeve, Aghanlish, Aghavoghill, Gubacreeny, Kinlough, Melvin, Tullaghan, in the former Rural District of Kinlough;

Ballaghameehan, Belhavel, Cloonclare, Cloonlogher, Drumahaire, Glenade, Glenaniff, Glenboy, Glencar, Glenfarn, Killarga, Kiltyclogher, Lurganboy, Manorhamilton, Munakill, Sramor in the former Rural District of Manorhamilton."

== TDs ==
Teachtaí Dála (TDs) for Donegal–Leitrim 1969–1977
Key to parties: FF = Fianna Fáil; FG = Fine Gael
Dáil	Election	Deputy (Party)	Deputy (Party)	Deputy (Party)
19th	1969	Cormac Breslin (Note: Breslin was Ceann Comhairle from 1967 to 1973. As outgoing Ceann Comhairle, he was automatically re-elected at the 1969 and 1973 general elections.) (FF)	Joseph Brennan (FF)	Patrick O'Donnell (FG)
19th	1970 by-election	Cormac Breslin (FF)	Joseph Brennan (FF)	Patrick Delap (FF)
20th	1973	Cormac Breslin (FF)	Joseph Brennan (FF)	James White (FG)
21st	1977	Constituency abolished. See Donegal and Sligo–Leitrim		

Note: The columns in this table are used only for presentational purposes, and no significance should be attached to the order of columns. For details of the order in which seats were won at each election, see the detailed results of that election.

== Elections ==
*: Outgoing TD

=== 1973 general election ===
1973 general election: Donegal–Leitrim
Party	Candidate	FPv%	Count				
Party	Candidate	FPv%	1	2	3	4	5
Fianna Fáil	Cormac Breslin (Note: As outgoing Ceann Comhairle, Breslin was returned automatically under Article 16.6 of the Constitution and the Electoral Act 1963.)	N/A	Returned automatically				
Fianna Fáil	Joseph Brennan	36.4	10,240				
Fine Gael	James White	25.3	7,122	7,174	7,190	7,838	10,523
Fianna Fáil	Patrick Delap	18.3	5,146	5,886	5,893	6,533	6,842
Fine Gael	Francis Cunningham	11.0	3,103	3,140	3,174	3,571	
Sinn Féin	Séamus Rodgers	8.6	2,436	2,453	2,495		
Independent	Kathleen Diskin	0.4	122	126			
Electorate: 38,540 Valid: 28,169 Quota: 9,390 Turnout: 73.1%

=== 1970 by-election ===
Following the death of Fine Gael TD Patrick O'Donnell, a by-election was held on 2 December 1970. The seat was won by the Fianna Fáil candidate Patrick Delap.

1970 Donegal–Leitrim by-election: Donegal–Leitrim
Party	Candidate	FPv%	Count
Party	Candidate	FPv%	1
Fianna Fáil	Patrick Delap	53.0	15,485
Fine Gael	James White	44.2	12,926
Labour	Maeve Gilmartin	2.8	804
Electorate: 38,605 Valid: 29,215 Quota: 14,608 Turnout: 75.7%

=== 1969 general election ===
1969 general election: Donegal–Leitrim
Party	Candidate	FPv%	Count	
Party	Candidate	FPv%	1	2
Fianna Fáil	Cormac Breslin (Note: As outgoing Ceann Comhairle, Breslin was returned automatically under Art. 16.6 of the Constitution and the Electoral Act 1963, as adapted by the Electoral (Amendment) Act 1969. He was elected again as Ceann Comhairle on 2 April 1969, leaving the Fianna Fáil parliamentary party.)	N/A	Returned automatically	
Fianna Fáil	Joseph Brennan	50.7	14,108	
Fine Gael	Patrick O'Donnell	29.3	8,141	9,432
Independent	Eunan Curristan	14.0	3,883	6,340
Labour	George Hunter	3.2	883	1,265
Labour	Maeve Gilmartin	2.8	789	1,498
Electorate: 38,599 Valid: 27,804 Quota: 9,269 Turnout: 72.0%

== See also ==
- Dáil constituencies
- Politics of the Republic of Ireland
- Historic Dáil constituencies
- Elections in the Republic of Ireland
