= 1972 Irish constitutional referendums =

Two referendums were held together in Ireland on 7 December 1972, each on a proposed amendment of the Irish constitution. Both proposals were approved by voters.

== Fourth amendment ==
The Fourth Amendment to the constitution lowered the voting age for all national elections and referendums in the state from twenty-one to eighteen years of age

Fourth Amendment of the Constitution of Ireland referendum
Choice	Votes	%
For	724,836	84.64
Against	131,514	15.36
Total	856,350	100.00
Valid votes	856,350	94.79
Invalid/blank votes	47,089	5.21
Total votes	903,439	100.00
Registered voters/turnout	1,783,604	50.65

== Fifth amendment ==
The Fifth Amendment to the constitution removed reference to "special position" of the Roman Catholic Church and to certain other named denominations.

Fifth Amendment of the Constitution of Ireland referendum
Choice	Votes	%
For	721,003	84.38
Against	133,430	15.62
Total	854,433	100.00
Valid votes	854,433	94.54
Invalid/blank votes	49,326	5.46
Total votes	903,759	100.00
Registered voters/turnout	1,783,604	50.67

== See also ==
- Constitutional amendment
- Politics of the Republic of Ireland
- History of the Republic of Ireland
