= 1973 Irish general election =

Election to the 20th Dáil

- 28 February 1973

144 seats in Dáil Éireann (Note: Including Cormac Breslin (FF), returned automatically for Donegal–Leitrim as outgoing Ceann Comhairle, under Art. 16.6 of the Constitution and the Electoral Act 1963.) 73 seats needed for a majority
- Turnout: 76.6% ▼0.3 pp
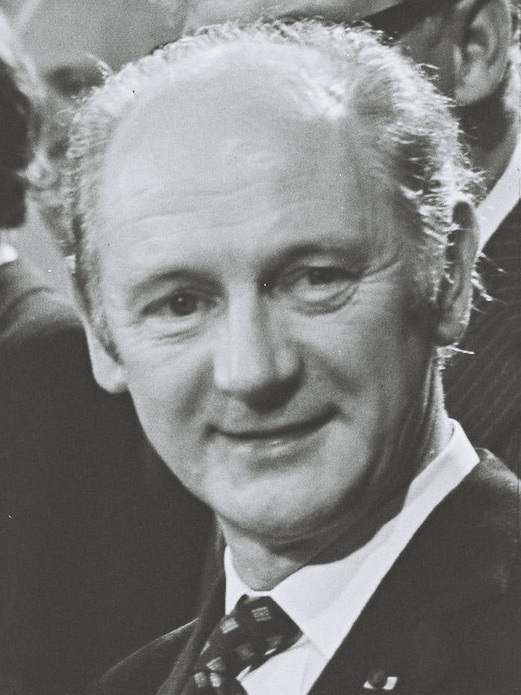

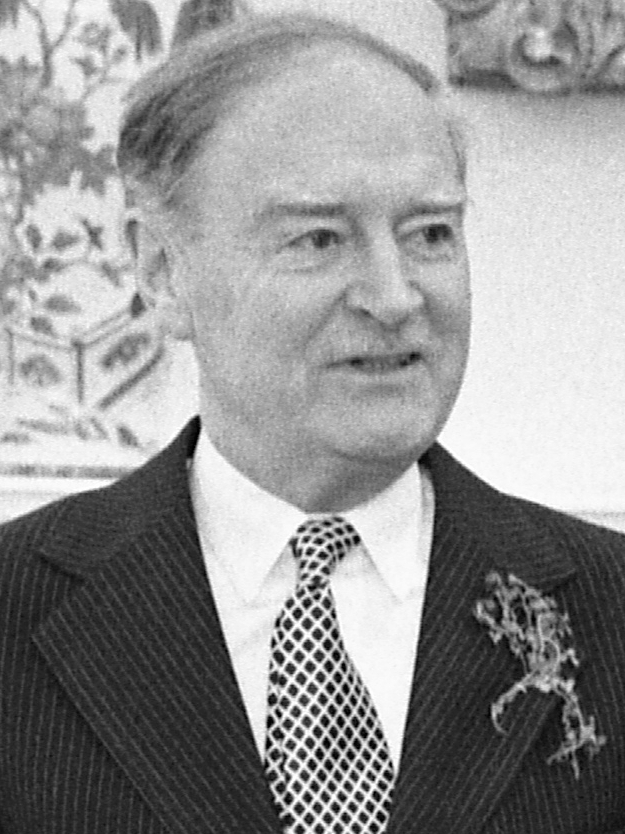

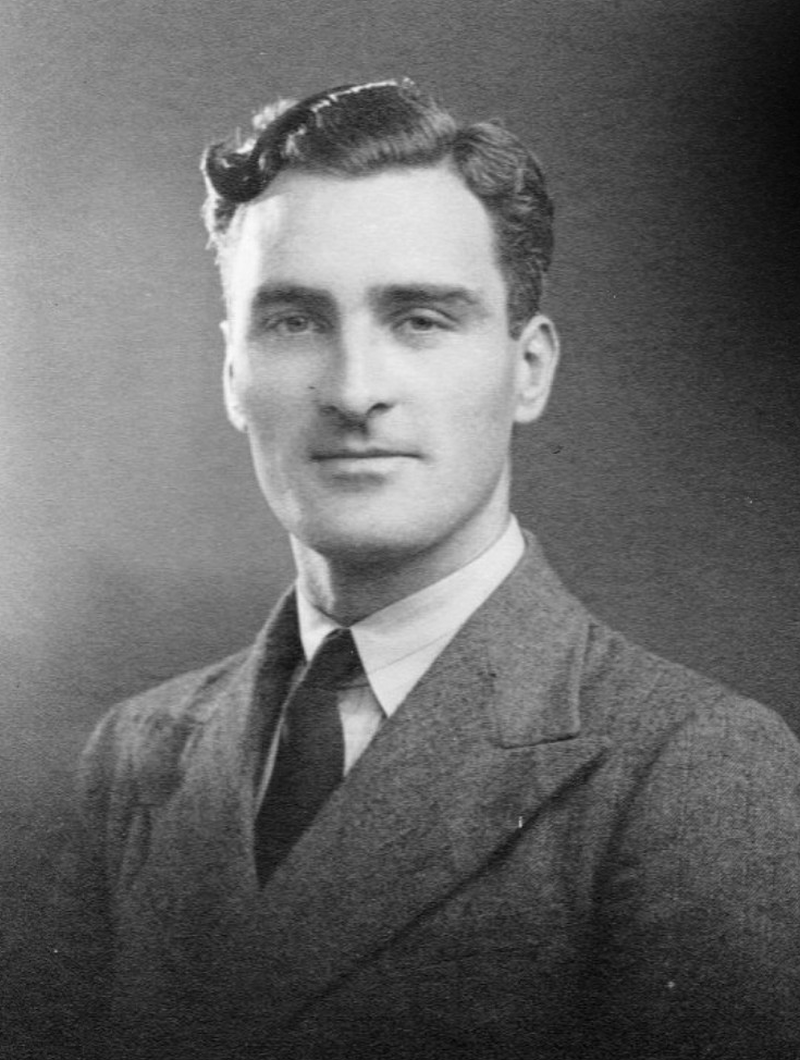
	First party	Second party	Third party
Leader	Jack Lynch	Liam Cosgrave	Brendan Corish
Party	Fianna Fáil	Fine Gael	Labour
Alliance		National Coalition	National Coalition
Leader since	9 November 1966	21 April 1965	2 March 1960
Leader's seat	Cork City North-West	Dún Laoghaire and Rathdown	Wexford
Last election	75 seats, 45.7%	50 seats, 34.1%	18 seats, 17.0%
Seats won	69	54	19
Seat change	▼6	▲4	▲1
Popular vote	624,528	473,781	184,656
Percentage	46.2%	35.1%	13.7%
Swing	▲0.5 pp	▲1.0 pp	▼3.3 pp
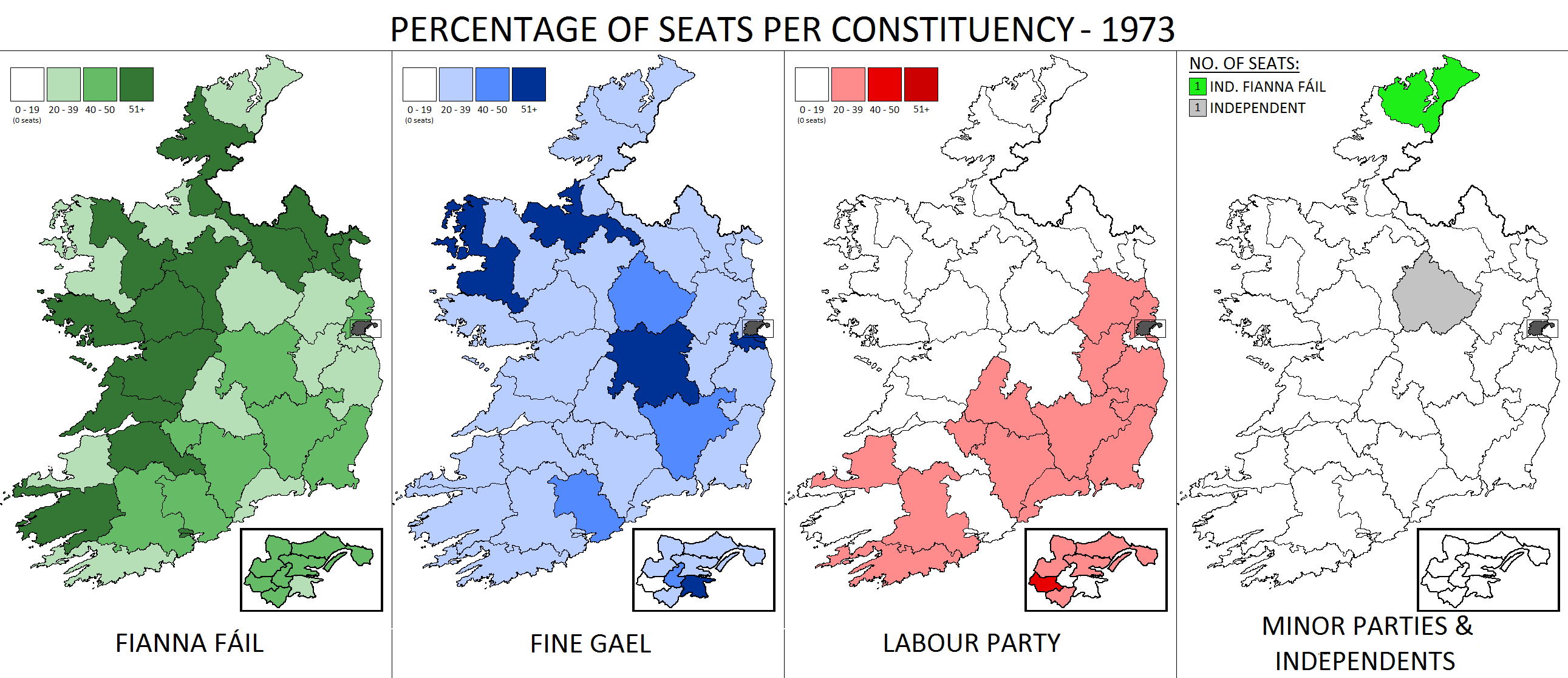
- Percentage of seats gained by each of the three major parties, and number of seats gained by smaller parties and independents.
Taoiseach before election
Jack Lynch
Fianna Fáil
Taoiseach after election
Liam Cosgrave
Fine Gael

The 1973 Irish general election to the 20th Dáil was held on Wednesday, 28 February 1973, following the dissolution of the 19th Dáil on 5 February by President Éamon de Valera on the request of Taoiseach Jack Lynch. The general election took place in 42 Dáil constituencies throughout Ireland for 144 seats in Dáil Éireann, the house of representatives of the Oireachtas.

Fianna Fáil, led by Taoiseach Jack Lynch, had won the previous three elections and maintained a dominant position in Irish politics since 1957. However, the 1973 election saw the first successful challenge to their power in over a decade. A pre-election pact between Fine Gael and the Labour Party formed the National Coalition, which presented a united front to the electorate for the first time in 16 years.

The election campaign was highly competitive, focusing on issues like national security, social welfare, and rising living costs. Despite Fianna Fáil increasing its share of the vote, it lost seats, leaving them with 69 seats. In contrast, the National Coalition gained a narrow majority, with Fine Gael securing 54 seats and Labour 19, giving the coalition a combined total of 73 seats.

Afterwards, the 20th Dáil met at Leinster House on 4 March to nominate the Taoiseach for appointment by the president and to approve the appointment of a new government of Ireland. Liam Cosgrave was appointed Taoiseach, forming the 14th government of Ireland, a coalition government of Fine Gael and the Labour Party.

== Background ==
By the time the 1973 general election was called, Fianna Fáil had held power for nearly sixteen years, a period that had seen the leadership transition from Éamon de Valera to Seán Lemass, and from Lemass to Jack Lynch in 1966. Although Lynch had initially hoped to dissolve the Dáil in December 1972, political events led to the election being delayed until February 1973.

== Campaign ==
This election was marked by a significant shift in the Irish political landscape, as Fine Gael and Labour, having spent years as separate opposition parties, decided to unite under the National Coalition banner. This pact, the first of its kind in Ireland in 16 years, was a strategic attempt to challenge Fianna Fáil's dominance. Both parties campaigned on shared issues such as economic challenges, rising prices, social welfare reforms, national security, and unemployment: issues that resonated strongly with voters feeling the strain of rising inflation and other economic pressures.

The National Coalition was able to present itself as a credible alternative to Fianna Fáil's long-standing rule. Fianna Fáil, on the other hand, despite holding a strong position with 75 seats, faced criticism for its handling of various issues, including national security and economic performance. The campaign also saw significant attention on the ongoing Troubles in Northern Ireland, which influenced the national discourse, though the National Coalition sought to distance itself from Fianna Fáil's record on the issue.

In the weeks leading up to election day, Jack Lynch's Fianna Fáil struggled to galvanise a strong campaign narrative. The opposition parties were particularly effective in criticising Fianna Fáil's handling of the economy and social issues, while Fine Gael and Labour worked together to highlight the government's shortcomings and present a united, fresh alternative.

On the ground, the National Coalition campaign was highly organised, and the message was clear: the time had come for change. The Labour Party, in particular, found success in areas where they had previously been weak, such as in Cork, where they made strong gains in constituencies like Cork Mid where Eileen Desmond topped the polls. In contrast, Fianna Fáil, despite increasing its overall vote share, found itself losing crucial seats across the country, a result of the finely balanced nature of the single transferable vote system, where transfers played a crucial role.

The campaign was also heavily focused on cost-of-living concerns, with rising prices becoming one of the key talking points. This reflected wider dissatisfaction with Fianna Fáil's economic policies and management, even as the party maintained its stronghold in some rural areas. Fine Gael and Labour made gains in Dublin, while Fianna Fáil's grip on urban areas began to slip.

== Challenge on voting age ==
The Fourth Amendment of the Constitution, approved in a referendum in December 1972 and signed into law in January 1973, had reduced the voting age from 21 to 18. However, the electoral register would not be updated until 15 April, five weeks after the election date. A 20-year-old student, represented by Seán MacBride, sought an injunction from the High Court postponing the election to vindicate his right to vote. He lost his case, although he was awarded his costs due to its "public importance".

== Result ==
The election day, 29 February 1973, saw a high level of voter turnout, with reports indicating that the result could hinge on just a few seats. The Evening Echo, reporting on the day, noted that the election had been one of the hardest-fought in recent years, with both sides campaigning vigorously on issues like prices, social welfare, jobs, and national security. The public's engagement in the campaign was intense, with the results expected to be tight and possibly decided in the transfer of votes.

Lynch, by now facing the growing realisation that the election might not go in Fianna Fáil's favour, continued to campaign hard. He personally cast his vote early in the morning at Rathgar National School in Dublin, joined by his wife. Fine Gael's leader, Liam Cosgrave, did likewise, casting his vote at Ballyroane National School in Rathfarnham. The mood of the campaign in these final days was tense, with both sides unsure about how the votes would finally play out.

As votes were counted in the days that followed, it became clear that while Fianna Fáil had gained in terms of the percentage of the vote, it was not enough to maintain its dominance. Despite the increased support, the distribution of votes across constituencies, combined with the transfer system, ensured that the National Coalition could seize power. Jack Lynch, despite being hopeful for a win in the early stages, was the first Taoiseach to concede defeat live on television during an interview with RTÉ’s Brian Farrell.

In the end, Fine Gael and Labour's combined total of 73 seats gave them a slim majority, and the National Coalition emerged victorious after a bitter and hard-fought campaign. The campaign had been marked by an effective opposition strategy that capitalised on Fianna Fáil's vulnerabilities, and the pact between Fine Gael and Labour proved to be a decisive factor in the outcome.

Election to the 20th Dáil – 28 February 1973
Party	Leader	Seats	±	% of seats	First pref. votes	% FPv	±%
Fianna Fáil	Jack Lynch	69	–6	47.9	624,528	46.2	+0.5
Fine Gael	Liam Cosgrave	54	+4	37.5	473,781	35.1	+1.0
Labour	Brendan Corish	19	+1	13.2	184,656	13.7	–3.3
Official Sinn Féin	Tomás Mac Giolla	0	New	0	15,366	1.1	–
Aontacht Éireann	Kevin Boland	0	New	0	12,321	0.9	–
Communist		0	0	0	466	0.0	–
Independent	N/A	2	+1	1.4	39,419	2.9	–0.3
Spoilt votes					15,937	—N/a	—N/a
Total		144	0	100	1,366,474	100	—N/a
Electorate/Turnout					1,783,604	76.6	—N/a

=== Voting summary ===
First preference vote
Fianna Fáil	46.24%
Fine Gael	35.08%
Labour	13.67%
Sinn Féin (Official)	1.14%
Aontacht Éireann	0.91%
Others	0.03%
Independent	2.92%

=== Seats summary ===
Dáil seats
Fianna Fáil	47.92%
Fine Gael	37.50%
Labour	13.19%
Independent	1.39%

== Government formation ==
Fine Gael and the Labour Party formed the 14th government of Ireland, dubbed the National Coalition, with Liam Cosgrave as Taoiseach and Brendan Corish as Tánaiste.

== Changes in membership ==
=== First-time TDs ===
- Liam Ahern
- Joseph Bermingham
- Ruairí Brugha
- Ray Burke
- Johnny Callanan
- Seán Calleary
- Brendan Daly
- John Esmonde
- Joseph Farrell
- Denis Gallagher
- Brendan Griffin
- Patrick Hegarty
- John Kelly
- Jimmy Leonard
- Charles McDonald
- Ciarán Murphy
- Fergus O'Brien
- John Ryan
- Myles Staunton
- Seán Walsh
- James White
- John Wilson

=== Retiring TD ===
- Frank Aiken

=== Defeated TDs ===
- Terence Boylan
- Michael Hilliard
- John O'Donovan
- Mícheál Ó Móráin

== Seanad election ==
The Dáil election was followed by an election to the 13th Seanad.
