= Lemass =

Lemass is a surname. Notable people with the surname include:

- Eileen Lemass (born 1932), Irish politician, wife of Noel
- Kathleen Lemass (1898–1985), wife of Seán Lemass
- Maureen Lemass, the birth name of Maureen Haughey (1925–2017), wife of Taoiseach Charles Haughey
- Noel Lemass (1929–1976), Irish politician
- Seán Lemass (1899–1971), Irish head of government
  - Lemass era, a period of economic change between 1959 and 1966
