= Seán Kelly (politician) =

Irish politician (born 1952)

Seán Kelly MEP
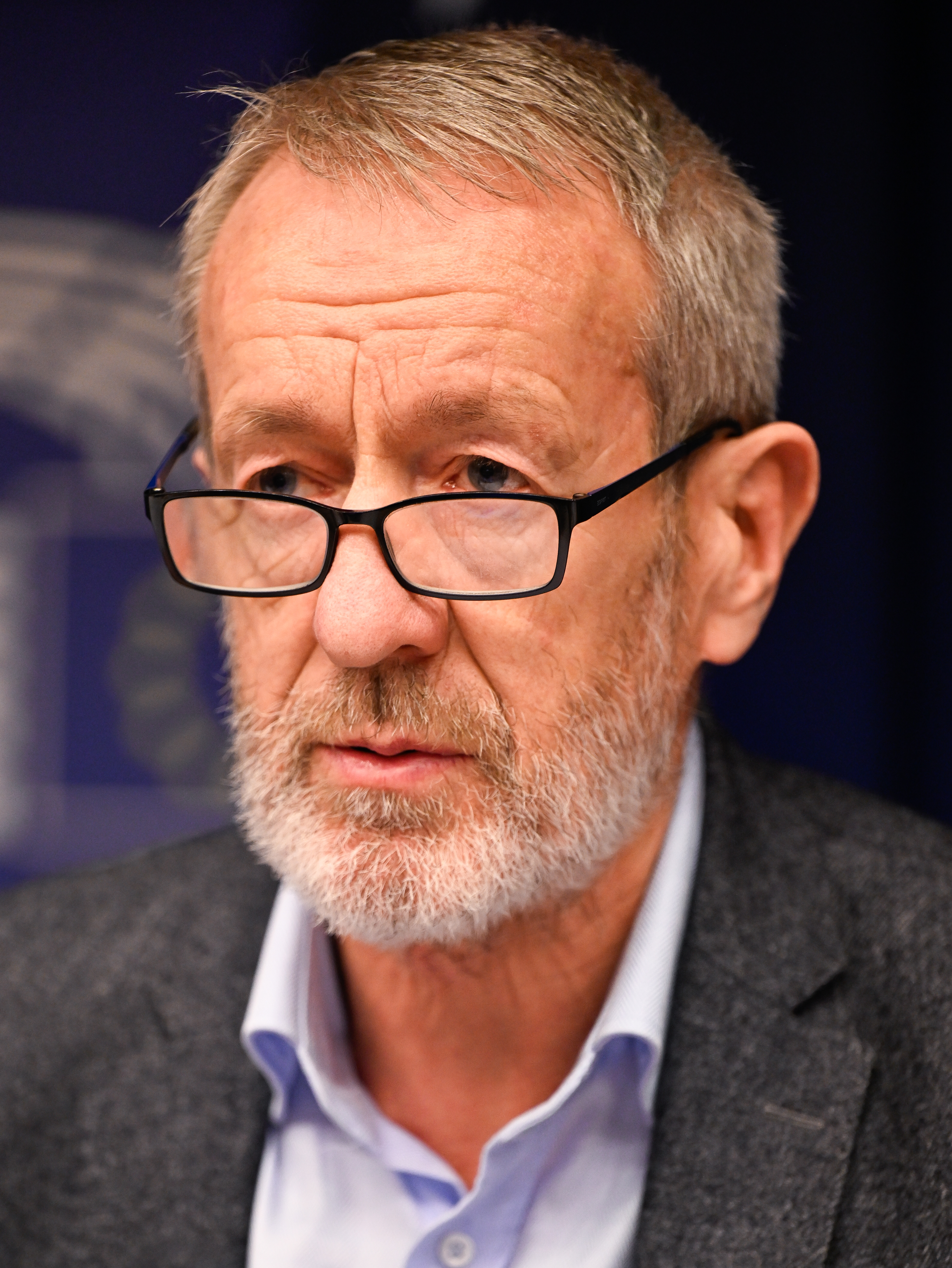
- Kelly in 2024

Member of the European Parliament
- Incumbent
- Assumed office 1 July 2009
- Constituency: South

Leader of Fine Gael in the European Parliament
- Incumbent
- Assumed office 4 May 2014

Personal details
- Born: 26 April 1952 (age 74) Killarney, County Kerry, Ireland
- Party: Ireland: Fine Gael; EU: European People's Party
- Spouse: Juliette Kelly (m. 1987)
- Children: 4
- Education: St Patrick's College of Education; University College Dublin
- Website: seankelly.eu

Seán Kelly (born 26 April 1952) is an Irish politician who has been a Member of the European Parliament (MEP) from Ireland for the South constituency since July 2009. He is a member of Fine Gael, part of the European People's Party.

He served as the 34th President of the Gaelic Athletic Association from 2003 to 2006. He was the first person from County Kerry to hold the office, being elected at his first attempt by a record margin at the GAA Congress in 2002. In July 2006, he took up the position of Executive Chairman of the Irish Institute of Sport, a body that was set up in Ireland to support elite athletes and players, and served as Executive President until he announced his resignation in July 2008.

== Early and personal life ==
Kelly was born in Knockataggle, Kilcummin, Killarney, County Kerry in 1952. He was born into a family that was deeply involved in the Gaelic Athletic Association (GAA). His grandfather had been chairman of the local club and his four uncles had distinguished playing careers, with his uncle, also Seán Kelly, starring at full-forward for Kerry in their All-Ireland SFC victory against Armagh in the 1953 final. He is a first cousin to Fionnuala O'Kelly, wife of former Taoiseach Enda Kenny.

Kelly was educated at Kilcummin National School, Tralee CBS and St Brendan's College, Killarney. He qualified as a primary school teacher in St Patrick's College of Education, Drumcondra and then attended University College Dublin where he received a BA in 1974 and Higher Diploma in Education (HDip) in 1975. He worked as a teacher in Dublin (Cromcastle Green, Kilmore West) and in St. Brendan's, Killarney.

== GAA career ==
Before being elected president of the GAA he served as chairman of the East Kerry from 1975 to 1987 and County Kerry Boards from 1987 to 1997 and Munster Council from 1997 to 2000. He also was one of the founding members of the St Patrick's (East Kerry) hurling team in 1984. As county chairman, he founded the Kerry GAA Supporters' Club in 1987.

As the first person from County Kerry to hold the office of President of the Gaelic Athletic Association, his presidency is seen as a landmark one in moving forward the Association on so many fronts with the introduction of Christy Ring Cup and Nicky Rackard Cup, Tommy Murphy Cup, All-Ireland Junior and Intermediate Championships, he also oversaw the completion of the Croke Park re-development through the completion of Hill 16/Northern end and the building of the Croke Park Jury's Hotel. He introduced the President's Awards and developed a great working relationship with the GPA and initiated major improvements in player welfare matters.

Concluding his career in the GAA he published an autobiography in 2007, titled "Rule 42 and all that".

He is also credited with the successful conclusion of arrangements for the use of Croke Park, the GAA's 82,500 capacity national stadium, by the Irish Rugby Football Union and the Football Association of Ireland while Lansdowne Road was being re-developed.

He was awarded an honorary doctorate by Dublin Institute of Technology in February 2007.

== Political career ==
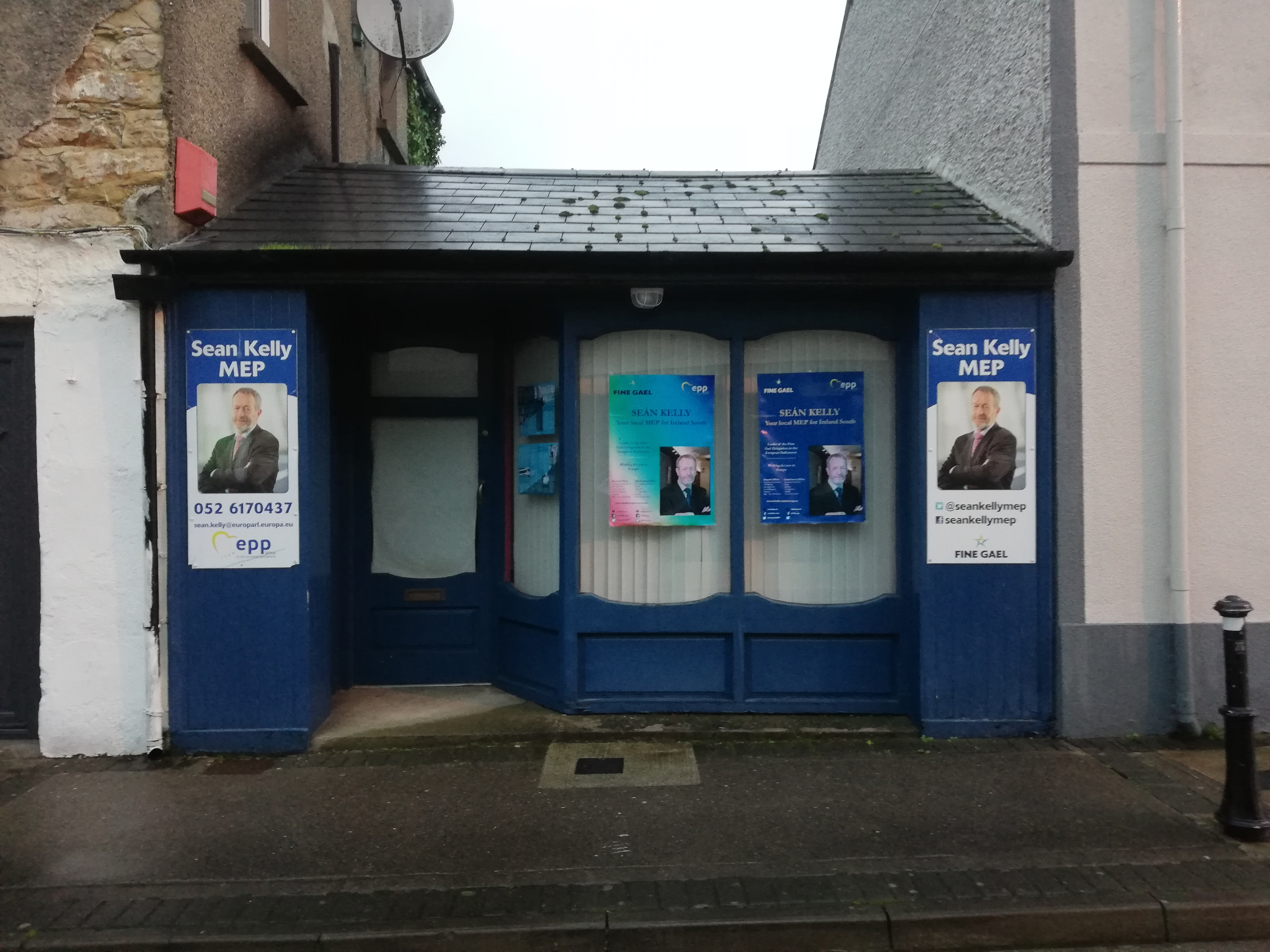
Kelly's offices in Clonmel, County Tipperary

Seán Kelly was elected as a Fine Gael candidate at the 2009 European Parliament election for the South constituency, at the expense of sitting MEP and party colleague Colm Burke. Kelly is a member of the European Parliament's Committee on Industry, Research and Energy, the Committee on International Trade and the Committee on Constitutional Affairs. He is a member of the Delegation for relations with South Africa and he serves as a member of the Delegation for relations with the Countries of South East Asia and ASEAN.

Kelly was elected MEP of the Year for Research and Innovation by fellow MEPs for his work on the European Parliament's ITRE Committee in 2012.

Kelly is a recipient of IAB Europe's Award for Leadership and Excellence in Public Policy for his work on data protection.

He had been mentioned as a possible Fine Gael candidate for the 2011 presidential election. He was re-elected as an MEP for the South constituency at the 2014 European Parliament election.

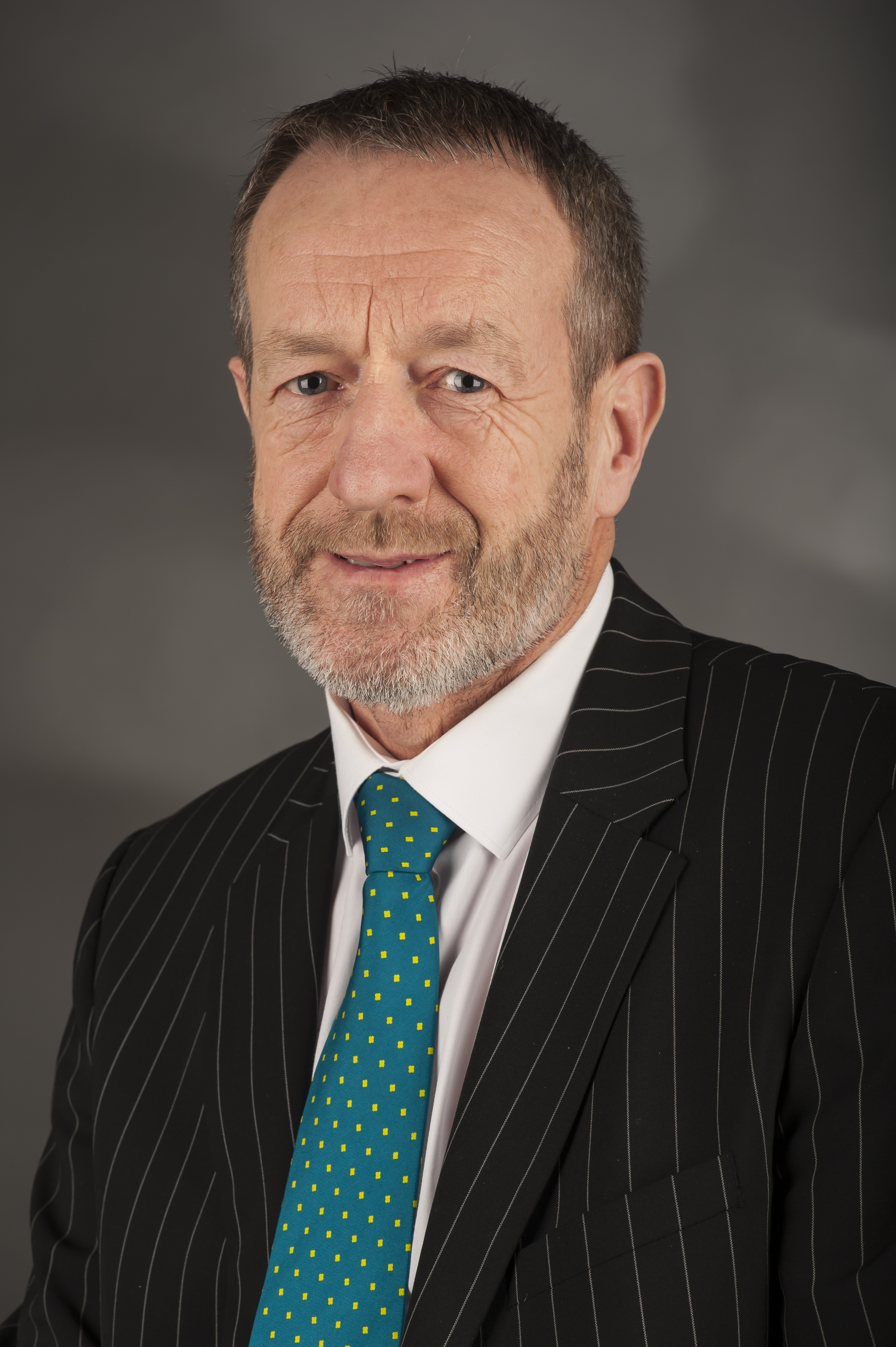
Kelly in 2014

In December 2020, Kelly received the Industry, Research & Innovation award at The Parliament Magazine's annual MEP Awards.

Kelly is known for his frequent use of the Irish language in the European Parliament. In January 2022, he submitted the first amendment to EU legislation that was written in the Irish language.

Kelly has lobbied to end the bi-annual clock change in the EU. However he is in favour of Ireland's adoption of year-round Summer time or Central European Time (UTC+1) instead of present Winter time Western European Time (UTC), closer to Ireland's natural solar time (UTC-0:30).

Kelly ran for re-election at the 2024 European Parliament election in Ireland with running mate John Mullins. Kelly was re-elected on the first count, topping the poll with 122,777 (17.8%) first preference votes .

Gaelic games
Preceded by Seán McCague	President of the Gaelic Athletic Association; 2003–2006	Succeeded by Nickey Brennan
