= Glimmer man =

1940s Irish gas usage inspector

A glimmer man (also rendered as "glimmerman"; Irish: fear fannléis) was a somewhat pejorative name unofficially, but almost universally, applied to inspectors who were employed by the Alliance and Dublin Consumers' Gas Company, the Cork Gas Consumers Company and other supply companies in the smaller towns and places in Ireland to detect the use of gas in restricted periods during the years of the Emergency in Ireland from March 1942 and in some places as late as 1947. The term derived from the copy of advertisements published in the media and on posters which enjoined the population not to waste gas ...not even a glimmer.

Ireland has negligible indigenous coal resources and production of coal gas was dependent on the importation of coal which was severely restricted as a result of the war in Europe. An extract from a letter states it was "a drastic fuel famine."

== Restrictions ==
Notwithstanding attempts by the Emergency Scientific Research Bureau to manufacture gas from bog peat, imports of suitable coal and therefore gas production fell dramatically and initially its use for home heating was prohibited. In March 1942 the supply in Dublin was cut to 10 hours per day during the week and 11 on Sundays but this only reduced usage by about a quarter. In May the supply was further reduced to 5.5 hours per day and the gas supply companies changed their terms of supply to make the use of gas in "off hours" a breach of contract. The off hours were popularly referred to as the "glimmer hours."

== Deprivation ==
The reductions in supply caused great privation as a large proportion of the population (particularly in the cities and towns) were dependent on gas for heat, cooking and lighting. As there were no readily available alternative sources of fuel, especially for cooking, people were reduced, if they could, to using the residual gas left in the pipes after the reticulated mains supply had been turned off at the gasworks. By 1943, the Dublin Gas Company were running advertisements describing the glimmer man as "a public benefactor […] Don't blame or hinder him in carrying out his duty."

Eventually the supply was so restricted that by April 1944 the Minister for Supplies, Seán Lemass was threatening to make a special Emergency Powers Order to officially ration the supply to dwellings and businesses to certain hours of the day and make it a criminal offence to use gas in the "off hours". However that threat was apparently never carried out.

One of the effects of the restrictions was that the smaller supply companies closed or attempted to maintain supply using gas derived from peat and charcoal.

== Powers ==
The gas companies' officials were empowered under their supply contract with their customers to enter premises to carry out their inspections and if they detected anyone using gas outside the permitted hours could disconnect the premises from the mains supply.

However, some Dublin residents, such as students at Trinity College Dublin were apparently immune from the inspectors' visits. This immunity may also have been due to the small numbers of inspectors employed – perhaps only two or three for the whole of Dublin.

== Reputation ==
The inspectors were reputed to be particularly intrusive when carrying out their duties as evidenced by the Phil Chevron lyric in "Faithful Departed" which suggests that in addition to the "boogie man", one can be "Rattled by the glimmer man" in the sense of being alarmed by their anticipated arrival.

== Historiography ==
In the 21st century doubt has been cast on whether in fact there were ever house to house inspections carried out by gas supply company officials. But one oral history graphically describes a glimmer man's inspections He came to our house I think about twice. He came at a very civil time of the day, when there nothing doing, you know? ... When he came into our house he put his hands over the thing and put powder on it then… with the powder, I don't know what time it would have to be since they were on, but he'd put the powder on, but we never got in any trouble over it. After a while everybody got to know them (laughs) "it's the glimmerman" and you'd be pouring water over it. Another writer describes the tribulations of a neighbouring widow to get reconnected and the lengths his mother went to avoid being detected using "the glimmer" but concedes that his house never received a visit. On the other hand, Irish secondary school history students are expected to have a knowledge of the topic and be able to comment on its significance.

The Irish Times also mentions the glimmerman in several Emergency-era issues (1942–45), including a robbery of a shop by a man pretending to be the glimmerman; a lengthy piece on the topic by Myles na gCopaleen; and a piece on children's street songs, in which glimmer men appeared among the subjects with Queen Caroline and Alfie Byrne.

== Legacy ==
Notwithstanding that the phenomenon of the glimmer man was transitory, perhaps much improved with the telling, and had in any event disappeared prior to the middle of the 20th century, it appears to have left an impact on the psyche of the Irish and not just those who lived through the Emergency period. The glimmer man is frequently referred to (as referenced here) in formal histories, blogs and websites newspaper and magazine articles, as well as oral histories and memoirs even if only in passing.

The impact is however most pronounced on those who did have direct experience such that the poet Paul Perry in The gas stove and the glimmerman describes how the memory is as significant to an old woman as that of the politician Éamon de Valera:

'She's gas; her eyes hold the best
part of the century. She'll tell you about the Black 'n Tans,
Dev, the gas stove and the glimmerman.
May the Glimmerman never return.
— from "Of The Gas Stove and the Glimmerman" by Paul Perry in The Drowning of the Saints, Salmon Poetry (2003)

The term is now applied metaphorically, particularly in Ireland, to any perceived intrusion into privacy (especially of a bureaucratic nature).
