= List of spouses or partners of the Taoiseach =

The spouse of the Taoiseach is the wife, husband or domestic partner of the Taoiseach of Ireland. The term "spouse of the Taoiseach" is not used in any official context.

The spouse of the Taoiseach often plays a public role accompanying their husband/partner in their duties as head of government at public events.

== List of spouses/partners ==
Name	Dates of marriage/partnership	Taoiseach (spouse)
Louisa Flanagan	1919–1965	W. T. Cosgrave
Sinéad Ní Fhlannagáin	1910–1975	Éamon de Valera
Ida Mary O'Malley	1919–1956	John A. Costello
Kathleen Hughes	1924–1971	Seán Lemass
Máirín O'Connor	1946–1999	Jack Lynch
Vera Osborne	1952–2016	Liam Cosgrave
Maureen Lemass	1951–2006	Charles Haughey
Joan O'Farrell	1947–1999	Garret FitzGerald
Kathleen Coen	1960–2014	Albert Reynolds
Finola Gill	1978–2024	John Bruton
Miriam Kelly	1975–1992 (sep.)	Bertie Ahern
Celia Larkin (Note: Domestic partner)	1996–2003	Bertie Ahern
Mary Molloy	1994–present	Brian Cowen
Fionnuala O'Kelly	1992–present	Enda Kenny
Matthew Barrett	2015–present	Leo Varadkar
Mary O'Shea	1989–present	Micheál Martin
Caoimhe Wade	2017–present	Simon Harris

== See also ==
- List of spouses of the president of Ireland
