= Máirín Lynch =

- Born: Máirín Rita O'Connor; 14 August 1916; Dublin, Ireland
- Died: 8 June 2004 (aged 87); Sandymount, Dublin, Ireland
- Known for: Spouse of the Taoiseach (1966–1973, 1977–1979)
- Spouse: Jack Lynch (m. 1946; died 1999)

Máirín Rita Lynch (née O'Connor; 14 August 1916 – 8 June 2004) was the wife of Jack Lynch, who served as Taoiseach from 1966 to 1973 and from 1977 to 1979.

Máirín O'Connor was born in Dublin in 1916. Her father was a naval doctor lost at sea during World War I; her mother worked for the Dublin Industrial Development Association. She met her future husband Jack Lynch, a player on both the Cork senior hurling and football teams, in the early 1940s. The couple married on 10 August 1946. Jack Lynch later served as a government minister throughout the 1950s, before rising to the position of Fianna Fáil leader and Taoiseach in 1966. It was only after consultation with his wife that Lynch allowed his name to go forward to succeed Seán Lemass. From that moment on, Máirín Lynch became a highly recognised and respected member in the public eye. She was ever-present at her husband's side and was a trusted confidante and steady influence on him, particularly during the Arms Crisis.

Máirín also played field hockey for Maids of the Mountain. In 1947 she was captain of the Maids team that won the Irish Junior Cup.

She died in Dublin on 8 June 2004.
