= Liam Skelly =

Irish businessman and politician (born 1941)

Teachta Dála
- In office May 1982 – February 1987
- Constituency: Dublin West

Personal details
- Born: 10 October 1941 (age 84) County Dublin, Ireland
- Party: Fine Gael
- Other political affiliations: Independent

Liam Skelly (born 10 October 1941) is an Irish barrister, businessman and former politician from Dublin. He was a Teachta Dála (TD) for Dublin West from 1982 to 1987.

== Dublin West by-election ==
Richard Burke, the Fine Gael TD for Dublin West, resigned his seat on 30 March 1982 to take up an appointment as Ireland's European Commissioner. Burke's appointment by the Taoiseach Charles Haughey was seen as a political "stroke". The appointment was in the gift of the Taoiseach, and all previous appointments had been from the governing party, but Haughey's government did not have a majority in Dáil Éireann, and could ill-afford to risk losing a seat in the by-election which would result from appointing a Fianna Fáil TD. Burke had been a Commissioner from 1977 to 1981, and had returned to the Dáil at the 1981 general election. The Dublin West seat was seen as winnable for Fianna Fáil, and Haughey's appointment of Burke raised the prospect of Fianna Fáil gaining a seat rather than losing one. In selecting a candidate, Fine Gael cast its net outside its own ranks, and chose Skelly, a businessman who had not previously been a member of a political party. After a closely fought campaign, Skelly won the Dublin West by-election on 25 May 1982. Eileen Lemass, contesting for Fianna Fáil, and who had been a TD for Dublin West until her defeat at the February 1982 general election, received more first-preference votes but Skelly won the seat on transfers.

== In the Dáil ==
Skelly was re-elected at the November 1982 general election, but found himself increasingly out of step with the direction taken by the government, and clashed with the leadership and with the constituency organisation. At the 1987 general election, he sought the Fine Gael nomination but was not selected. He contested the election as an independent for the rest of the 24th Dáil, but won only 3.4% of the first-preference votes and lost his seat.

Dáil	Election	Deputy (Party)	Deputy (Party)	Deputy (Party)	Deputy (Party)	Deputy (Party)
22nd	1981	Jim Mitchell (FG)	Brian Lenihan Snr (FF)	Richard Burke (FG)	Eileen Lemass (FF)	Brian Fleming (FG)
23rd	1982 (Feb)	Jim Mitchell (FG)	Brian Lenihan Snr (FF)	Richard Burke (FG)	Liam Lawlor (FF)	Brian Fleming (FG)
23rd	1982 by-election	Jim Mitchell (FG)	Brian Lenihan Snr (FF)	Liam Skelly (FG)	Liam Lawlor (FF)	Brian Fleming (FG)
24th	1982 (Nov)	Jim Mitchell (FG)	Brian Lenihan Snr (FF)	Liam Skelly (FG)	Eileen Lemass (FF)	Tomás Mac Giolla (WP)
25th	1987	Jim Mitchell (FG)	Brian Lenihan Snr (FF)	Pat O'Malley (PDs)	Liam Lawlor (FF)	Tomás Mac Giolla (WP)
26th	1989	Jim Mitchell (FG)	Brian Lenihan Snr (FF)	Austin Currie (FG)	Liam Lawlor (FF)	Tomás Mac Giolla (WP)
27th	1992	Joan Burton (Lab)	Brian Lenihan Snr (FF)	Austin Currie (FG)	Liam Lawlor (FF)	4 seats 1992–2002
27th	1996 by-election	Joan Burton (Lab)	Brian Lenihan Jnr (FF)	Austin Currie (FG)	Liam Lawlor (FF)	4 seats 1992–2002
28th	1997	Joe Higgins (SP)	Brian Lenihan Jnr (FF)	Austin Currie (FG)	Liam Lawlor (FF)	4 seats 1992–2002
29th	2002	Joe Higgins (SP)	Brian Lenihan Jnr (FF)	Joan Burton (Lab)	3 seats 2002–2011	
30th	2007	Leo Varadkar (FG)	Brian Lenihan Jnr (FF)	Joan Burton (Lab)	3 seats 2002–2011	
31st	2011	Leo Varadkar (FG)	Brian Lenihan Jnr (FF)	Joan Burton (Lab)	Joe Higgins (SP)	4 seats 2011–2024
31st	2011 by-election	Leo Varadkar (FG)	Patrick Nulty (Lab)	Joan Burton (Lab)	Joe Higgins (SP)	4 seats 2011–2024
31st	2014 by-election	Leo Varadkar (FG)	Ruth Coppinger (SP)	Joan Burton (Lab)	Joe Higgins (SP)	4 seats 2011–2024
32nd	2016	Leo Varadkar (FG)	Ruth Coppinger (AAA–PBP)	Joan Burton (Lab)	Jack Chambers (FF)	4 seats 2011–2024
33rd	2020	Leo Varadkar (FG)	Paul Donnelly (SF)	Roderic O'Gorman (GP)	Jack Chambers (FF)	4 seats 2011–2024
34th	2024	Emer Currie (FG)	Paul Donnelly (SF)	Roderic O'Gorman (GP)	Jack Chambers (FF)	Ruth Coppinger (PBP–S)
