= Kathleen Lemass =

Wife of the third Taoiseach of Ireland Seán Lemass

- Born: Kathleen Mary Josephine Hughes; 18 September 1898; Ranelagh, Dublin, Ireland
- Died: 14 March 1985 (aged 86); Churchtown, Dublin
- Resting place: Deansgrange, Dublin
- Known for: Spouse of the Taoiseach (1959–1966)
- Spouse: Seán Lemass (m. 1924; died 1971)
- Children: 4, including Maureen and Noel
- Relatives: Charles Haughey (son-in-law); Seán Haughey (grandson); Eileen Lemass (daughter-in-law)

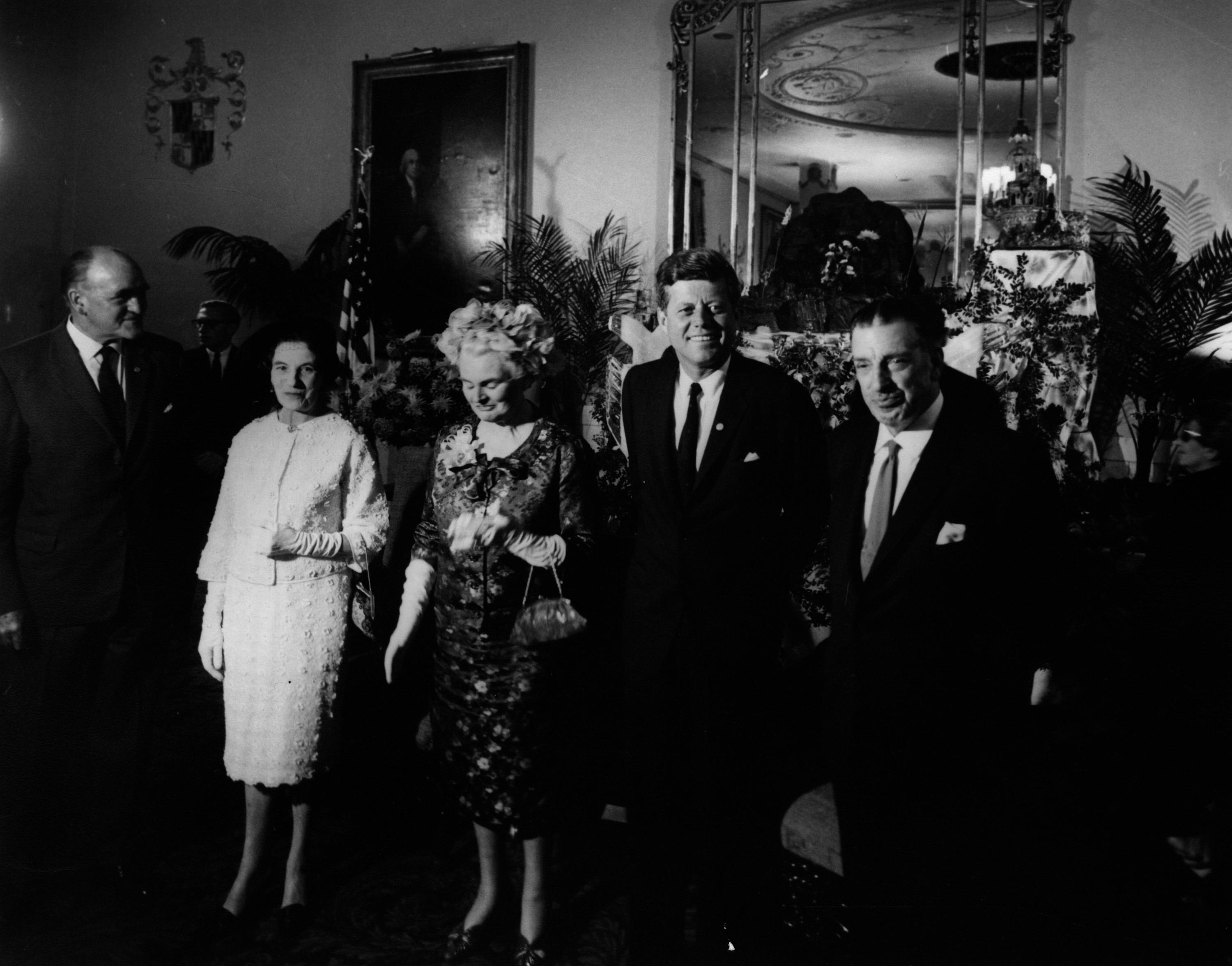
Lemass is left of President John F. Kennedy

Kathleen Mary Josephine Lemass (née Hughes; 18 September 1898 – 14 March 1985) was the wife of Seán Lemass who served as Taoiseach from 1959 to 1966.

== Biography ==
Kathleen Muriel Hughes was born at Beechwood Avenue in Ranelagh, the eldest of five children, four of whom survived to adulthood. Her father, Thomas Hughes, was a carpet buyer in Arnotts. The Hughes family were largely apolitical and played no active role during the Irish revolutionary period.

As a young woman she worked as a shorthand typist. She studied singing under Vincent O'Brien and won prizes at the Feis Ceoil.

Hughes met Seán Lemass when they were both children. Their families were friendly and would often holiday together in Skerries during the summer. A relationship developed, with Hughes writing to him during his imprisonment following the 1916 Easter Rising. The couple became engaged; however, the marriage was initially opposed to by her father who felt that Lemass had been spending so much time in prison that he could not make a proper home. In spite of this the couple married on 24 August 1924 at the Church of the Holy Name in Ranelagh.

The Lemasses had four children: Maureen, Margaret (Peggy), Noel and Sheila. The three daughters all got tuberculosis at the same time. Maureen Lemass later married Charles Haughey, who would succeed his father-in-law as leader of Fianna Fáil and Taoiseach in 1979. Noel Lemass followed his father into politics, serving alongside him as a TD.

Seán Lemass was elected as a TD for Dublin South shortly after his marriage in November 1924. Over the next 35 years he worked tirelessly to build and develop the Fianna Fáil party. He was a long-serving Minister for Industry and Commerce before being promoted to the position of Tánaiste. In 1959, he was unanimously appointed leader of Fianna Fáil before being elected Taoiseach. For much of her husbands' political career she kept a low profile and enjoyed a background role, however, as the wife of the Taoiseach she often accompanied him on official visits. Along with her husband she met US President John F. Kennedy just two months before his assassination in 1963.

Her husband resigned as Taoiseach in 1966, before eventually retiring from politics in 1969. He died on 11 May 1971. Kathleen Lemass died in Dublin on 15 March 1985.
