= Maids of the Mountain Hockey Club =

Field hockey club in South Dublin (county), Ireland

Maids of the Mountain
- Union: Irish Ladies Hockey Union
- Full name: Maids of the Mountain Hockey Club
- Nickname(s): Hags of the Hill; Hoors of the Moores; The Bitches in the Ditches; The Tarts of the Town
- Founded: 1918
- Ground: Grange Road; Rathfarnham; South Dublin; Ireland
- League: Leinster Senior League

Maids of the Mountain Hockey Club was a women's field hockey club based in Rathfarnham, South Dublin, Ireland. The club was founded in 1918 and was originally based in Foxrock. Maids of the Mountain were closely associated with Three Rock Rovers Hockey Club. The club was founded by a group of women, the majority of whom were the wives, widows, partners, sisters or children of Three Rock Rovers players. The clubs also shared grounds and eventually merged in 1999. In 1923 Maids of the Mountain completed a national cup double, winning both the Irish Senior Cup and the Irish Junior Cup.

== History ==
=== Early years ===
Maids of the Mountain Hockey Club was founded in 1918. The prime mover in establishing the club was Hilda O'Reilly who subsequently captained the Ireland women's national field hockey team during the 1920s. There are two stories about the origin of the club name. The club was formed by a group of women or Maids, the majority of whom were the wives, widows, partners, sisters and children of Three Rock Rovers players. Many were also members of the Voluntary Aid Detachment. The Mountain in the club name refers to Three Rock Mountain, the same mountain that Three Rock Rovers were named after. A second story claims the club was named after The Maid of the Mountains, the operetta written by Harold Fraser-Simson, which was being performed at the Gaiety Theatre, Dublin in August 1918.

=== Irish Senior Cup ===
In 1919–20, after playing just three seasons, Maids of the Mountain won a treble, winning the Irish Senior Cup, the Leinster Senior Cup and the Leinster Senior League.

Season	Winners	Score	Runners up
1920	Maids of the Mountain	3–2	Knock
1923	Maids of the Mountain		
1926	Queen's University	2–1 (Note: After extra time.)	Maids of the Mountain
1928	Knock	9–1	Maids of the Mountain
1929	Queen's University	6–4 (Note: After extra time.)	Maids of the Mountain
1930	Maids of the Mountain		
1935	Maids of the Mountain	5–1	Instonians

=== Irish Junior Cup ===
In 1923 Maids of the Mountain won the Irish Junior Cup for the first time. In 1947 when the club won the cup for a second time, the team was captained by Máirín Lynch, the wife of future Taoiseach, Jack Lynch.

Season	Winners	Score	Runners up
1923	Maids of the Mountain II		
1947	Maids of the Mountain II		
1963	Ards A	2–1 (Note: After extra time.)	Maids of the Mountain II
1969	Pegasus II	2–0	Maids of the Mountain II
1975	Maids of the Mountain II		Old Ursuline's (Note: Team from Cork or Athlone)

=== Merger ===
In 1988, Maids of the Mountain moved to Grange Road, Rathfarnham, South Dublin where they shared the facilities with Three Rock Rovers. On 25 May 1999, the two clubs merged to become one club.

== Home grounds ==
Maids of the Mountain originally played at the home grounds of Three Rock Rovers in Foxrock. In 1930, after Three Rock Rovers moved to Londonbridge Road, the headquarters of the Irish Hockey Union in Ringsend, the Maids remained in Foxrock. In 1934 they moved to grounds in Templeogue. During the 1985–86 season the Templeogue grounds were sold to builders for development. The Maids remained homeless until 1988 when they settled at Grange Road, once again sharing a home ground with Three Rock Rovers.

== Notable players ==
Ireland internationals

- Ros Huet
- Dorothy Lavery
- Vera McWeeney
- Hilda O'Reilly
- Joan Shaw
- H. Wallis

Others

- Muriel Gahan
- Máirín Lynch: wife of future Taoiseach, Jack Lynch.

== Honours ==
- Irish Senior Cup
  - Winners: 1920, 1923, 1930, 1935: 4
  - Runners Up: 1926, 1928, 1929 : 3
- Irish Junior Cup
  - Winners: 1923, 1947, 1975: 3
  - Runners Up: 1963, 1969: 2
