= 1982 Dublin West by-election =

By-election to the 23rd Dáil

- 25 May 1982
- Turnout: 43,061 (61.3%)
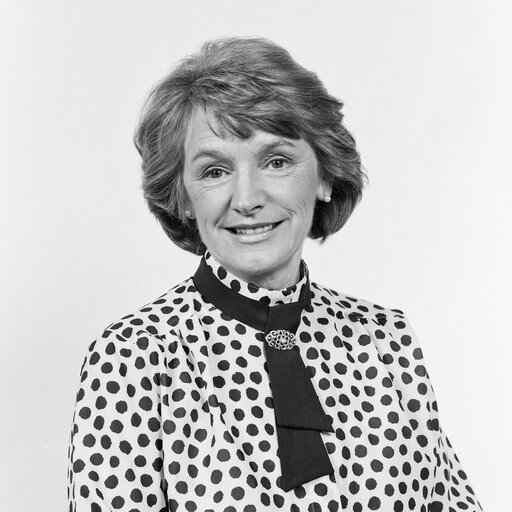

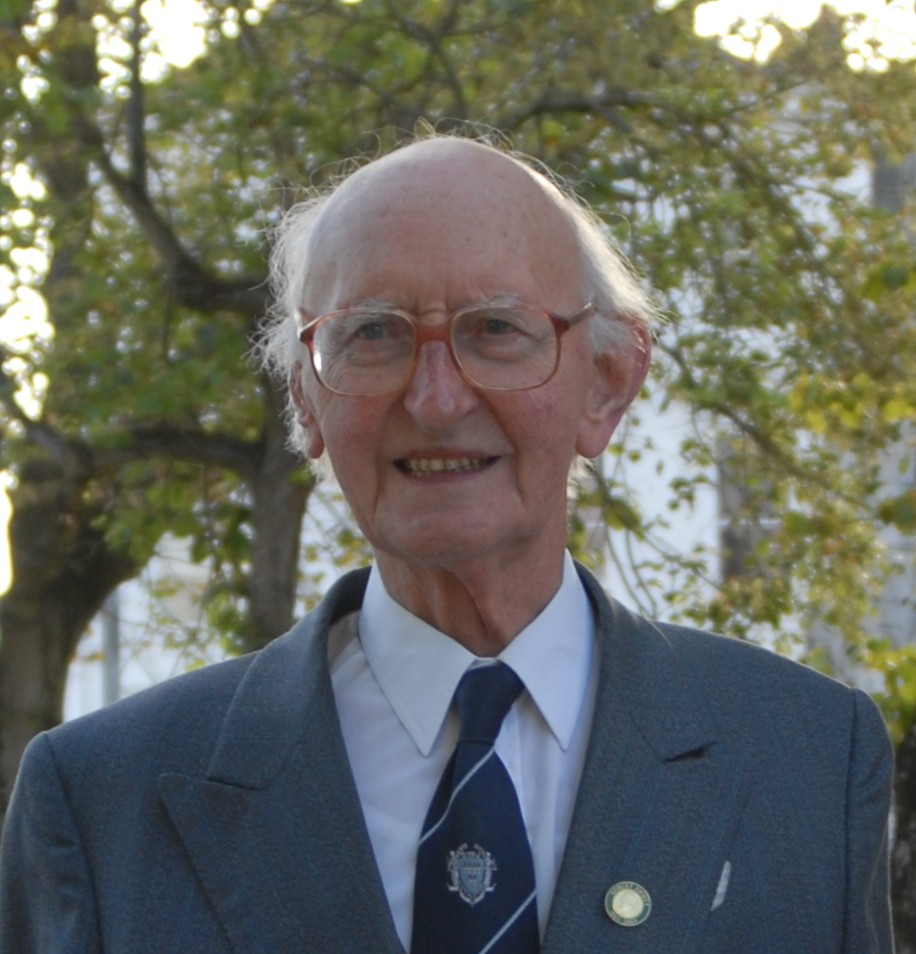
	Skelly
Nominee	Liam Skelly	Eileen Lemass	Tomás Mac Giolla
Party	Fine Gael	Fianna Fáil	Sinn Féin The Workers' Party
First preferences	16,777	17,095	6,357
Percentage	39.0%	39.7%	14.8%
Final count	21,388	19,206	–
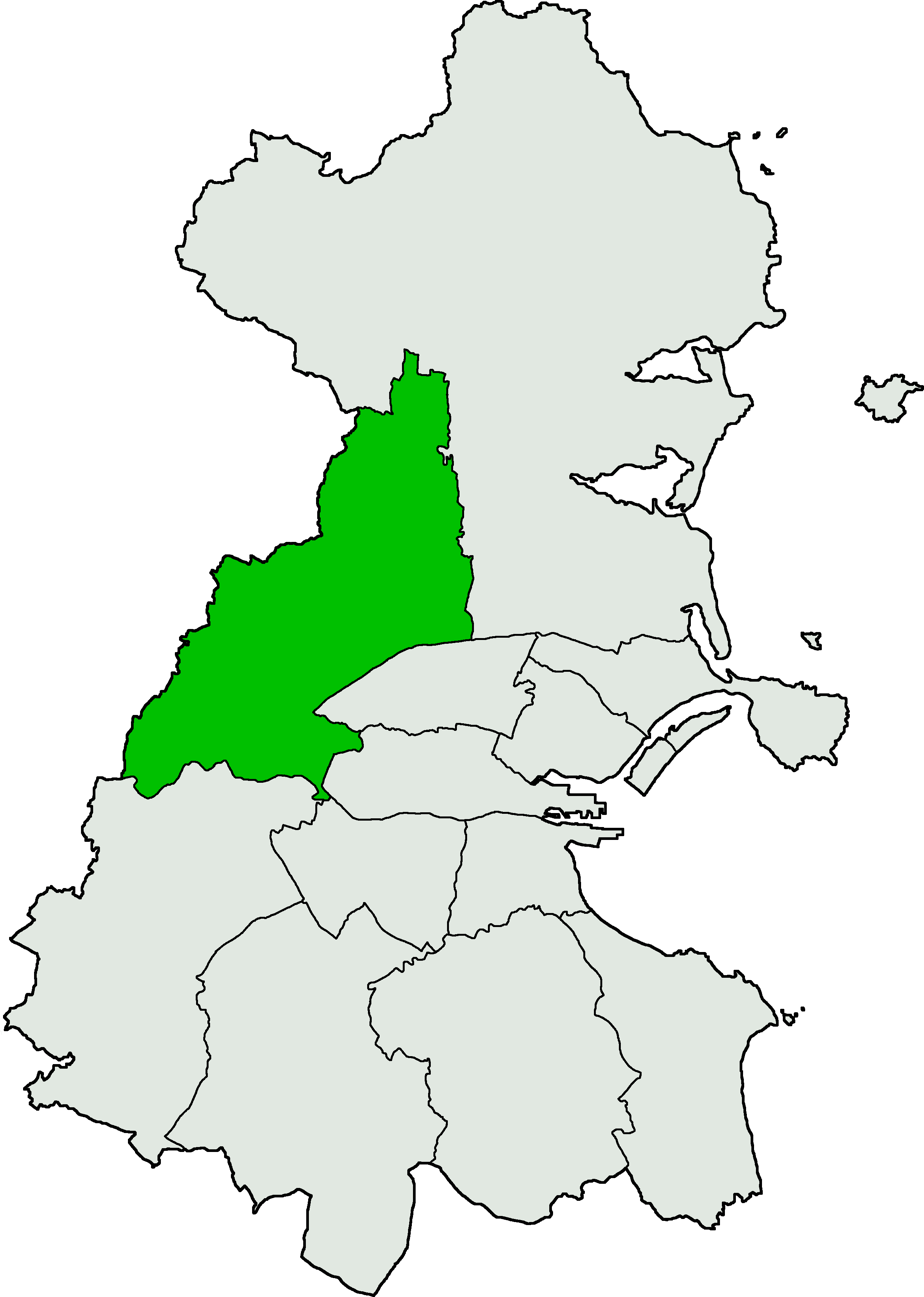
- Dublin West shown within County Dublin
TD before election
Richard Burke
Fine Gael
TD after election
Liam Skelly
Fine Gael

A Dáil by-election was held in the constituency of Dublin West in Ireland on Tuesday, 25 May 1982, to fill a vacancy in the 23rd Dáil. It followed the resignation of Fine Gael Teachta Dála (TD) Richard Burke after his nomination by the Fianna Fáil government as European commissioner.

A Fine Gael motion to issue the writ of election to fill the vacancy was agreed by the Dáil on 4 May 1982.

The by-election was won by the Fine Gael candidate Liam Skelly.

The runner-up Eileen Lemass, was elected at the November 1982 general election for Dublin West.

== Result ==
1982 Dublin West by-election
Party	Candidate	FPv%	Count		
Party	Candidate	FPv%	1	2	3
Fianna Fáil	Eileen Lemass	39.7	17,095	17,571	19,206
Fine Gael	Liam Skelly	39.0	16,777	17,736	21,388
Sinn Féin The Workers' Party	Tomás Mac Giolla	14.8	6,357	7,446	
Independent	John O'Halloran	1.8	785		
Labour	Brendan O'Sullivan	1.6	703		
Democratic Socialist	Michael Conaghan	1.6	667		
Independent	Matt Merrigan	0.8	334		
Independent	John Condron	0.5	233		
Independent	Séamus O'Daly	0.2	68		
Independent	Jim Tallon	0.1	42		
Electorate: 70,203 Valid: 43,061 Quota: 21,531 Turnout: 61.3%
