= Seán Haughey =

Irish former politician (born 1961)

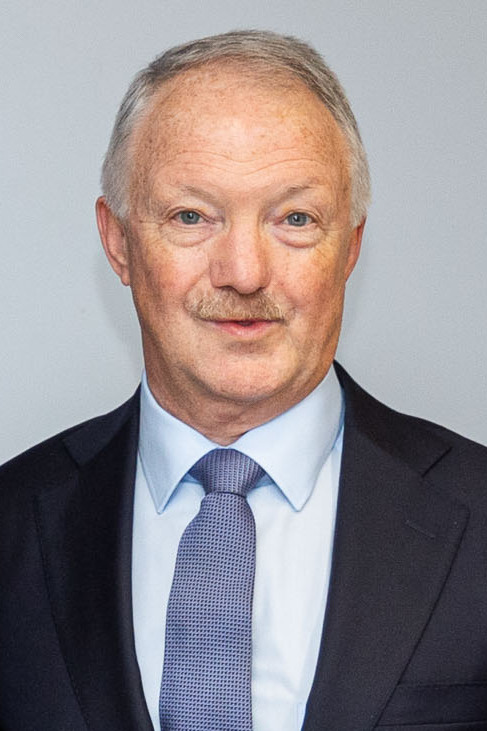
- Haughey in 2024

Minister of State
- 2010–2011: Enterprise, Trade and Innovation
- 2010–2011: Education and Skills
- 2007–2010: Enterprise, Trade and Employment
- 2006–2010: Education and Science

Lord Mayor of Dublin
- In office 20 June 1989 – 20 June 1990
- Preceded by: Ben Briscoe
- Succeeded by: Michael Donnelly

Teachta Dála
- In office February 2016 – November 2024
- Constituency: Dublin Bay North
- In office November 1992 – February 2011
- Constituency: Dublin North-Central

Senator
- In office 25 April 1987 – 25 November 1992
- Constituency: Administrative Panel

Personal details
- Born: 8 November 1961 (age 64) Raheny, Dublin, Ireland
- Party: Fianna Fáil
- Spouse: Orla O'Brien (m. 1988)
- Children: 4
- Parents: Charles Haughey (father); Maureen Lemass (mother)
- Relatives: Seán Lemass (grandfather)
- Education: Trinity College Dublin
- Website: seanhaughey.ie

Seán Haughey (born 8 November 1961) is an Irish former Fianna Fáil politician who served as a Teachta Dála (TD) for the Dublin Bay North constituency from 2016 to 2024, and previously from 1992 to 2011 for the Dublin North-Central constituency. He served as a Minister of State from 2006 to 2011 and Lord Mayor of Dublin from 1989 to 1990. He was a Senator for the Administrative Panel from 1987 to 1992.

== Early life ==
The son of former Taoiseach Charles Haughey and Maureen Lemass, Haughey was educated at St Paul's College, Raheny, Dublin, and Trinity College Dublin, where he received a Bachelor of Arts degree in Economics and Politics.

== Political career ==
Haughey entered politics in 1985 when he was elected to Dublin City Council for the Artane local electoral area. He was re-elected to the council in 1991 and 1999 and served until 2003. He was Lord Mayor of Dublin from 1989 to 1990.

Haughey served as a member of Seanad Éireann from 1987 until 1992. In that year he was elected to Dáil Éireann as a Fianna Fáil TD for Dublin North-Central. He had unsuccessfully contested the Dublin North-East constituency at the 1987 and 1989 general elections.

In June 2006, Haughey apologised for failing to disclose receiving £2,300 from Monarch Properties to the Mahon Tribunal. Haughey was appointed by Bertie Ahern in December 2006 as a Minister of State at the Department of Education and Science, with responsibility for Adult Education, Youth Affairs and Educational Disadvantage. In June 2007, he was appointed as Minister of State at the Department of Education and Science and at the Department of Enterprise, Trade and Employment with responsibility for Lifelong Learning, Youth Work and School Transport. He was re-appointed by Brian Cowen in 2008, and again when the number of junior ministers was reduced.

He lost his seat at the 2011 general election. He was elected to Dublin City Council for the Clontarf local electoral area at the 2014 local elections. He regained a seat in the Dáil at the 2016 general election, when he was returned for the new Dublin Bay North constituency. He was re-elected at the general election in February 2020.

As of 2021, Haughey is the biggest stock market shareholder in the Dáil, holding at least €442,000 in shares, including shares in Pfizer and Amazon.

On 6 February 2024, Haughey announced that he would not contest the next general election.

== Personal life ==
Haughey is a member of a political family. His father was Charles Haughey, while his maternal grandfather was Seán Lemass; each served as Taoiseach. His uncle Noel Lemass and aunt Eileen Lemass were also members of Dáil Éireann. Through his father, Haughey is also related to Olympic medalist Siobhán Haughey.

Haughey is married to Orla O'Brien, and the couple have four children.

On 4 February 2021, he undertook godparenthood for Vitold Ashurak, Belarusian activist and political prisoner. After the death of Ashurak in May, Haughey took over the patronage of Dzyanis Ivashin, a journalist of Novy Chas and Belarusian political prisoner, on 30 June 2021.

== See also ==
- Families in the Oireachtas

Civic offices
Preceded by Ben Briscoe	Lord Mayor of Dublin; 1989–1990	Succeeded by Michael Donnelly
Political offices
Preceded by Síle de Valera	Minister of State at the Department of Education and Science (Education and Skills from 2010); 2006–2011	Succeeded by Seán Sherlock; Ciarán Cannon
Preceded by Michael Ahern; Tony Killeen	Minister of State at the Department of Enterprise, Trade and Employment (Enterprise, Trade and Innovation from 2010); 2007–2011; With: Billy Kelleher; John McGuinness (2007–2009); Jimmy Devins (2007–2009); John Moloney (2008–2010); Conor Lenihan (2009–2011); Dara Calleary (2009–2011)	Succeeded by Seán Sherlock; John Perry

Dáil	Election	Deputy (Party)	Deputy (Party)	Deputy (Party)	Deputy (Party)
13th	1948	Vivion de Valera (FF)	Martin O'Sullivan (Lab)	Patrick McGilligan (FG)	3 seats 1948–1961
14th	1951	Vivion de Valera (FF)	Colm Gallagher (FF)	Patrick McGilligan (FG)	3 seats 1948–1961
15th	1954	Vivion de Valera (FF)	Maureen O'Carroll (Lab)	Patrick McGilligan (FG)	3 seats 1948–1961
16th	1957	Vivion de Valera (FF)	Colm Gallagher (FF)	Patrick McGilligan (FG)	3 seats 1948–1961
16th	1957 by-election	Vivion de Valera (FF)	Frank Sherwin (Ind.)	Patrick McGilligan (FG)	3 seats 1948–1961
17th	1961	Vivion de Valera (FF)	Frank Sherwin (Ind.)	Patrick McGilligan (FG)	Celia Lynch (FF)
18th	1965	Vivion de Valera (FF)	Michael O'Leary (Lab)	Luke Belton (FG)	Celia Lynch (FF)
19th	1969	George Colley (FF)	Michael O'Leary (Lab)	Luke Belton (FG)	Celia Lynch (FF)
20th	1973	George Colley (FF)	Michael O'Leary (Lab)	Luke Belton (FG)	Celia Lynch (FF)
21st	1977	Vincent Brady (FF)	Michael O'Leary (Lab)	Michael Keating (FG)	3 seats 1977–1981
22nd	1981	Vincent Brady (FF)	Charles Haughey (FF)	Noël Browne (SLP)	George Birmingham (FG)
23rd	1982 (Feb)	Vincent Brady (FF)	Charles Haughey (FF)	Richard Bruton (FG)	George Birmingham (FG)
24th	1982 (Nov)	Vincent Brady (FF)	Charles Haughey (FF)	Richard Bruton (FG)	George Birmingham (FG)
25th	1987	Vincent Brady (FF)	Charles Haughey (FF)	Richard Bruton (FG)	George Birmingham (FG)
26th	1989	Vincent Brady (FF)	Charles Haughey (FF)	Richard Bruton (FG)	Ivor Callely (FF)
27th	1992	Seán Haughey (FF)	Derek McDowell (Lab)	Richard Bruton (FG)	Ivor Callely (FF)
28th	1997	Seán Haughey (FF)	Derek McDowell (Lab)	Richard Bruton (FG)	Ivor Callely (FF)
29th	2002	Seán Haughey (FF)	Finian McGrath (Ind.)	Richard Bruton (FG)	Ivor Callely (FF)
30th	2007	Seán Haughey (FF)	Finian McGrath (Ind.)	Richard Bruton (FG)	3 seats from 2007
31st	2011	Aodhán Ó Ríordáin (Lab)	Finian McGrath (Ind.)	Richard Bruton (FG)	3 seats from 2007
32nd	2016	Constituency abolished. See Dublin Bay North			

Dáil	Election	Deputy (Party)	Deputy (Party)	Deputy (Party)	Deputy (Party)	Deputy (Party)
32nd	2016	Denise Mitchell (SF)	Tommy Broughan (I4C)	Finian McGrath (Ind.)	Seán Haughey (FF)	Richard Bruton (FG)
33rd	2020	Denise Mitchell (SF)	Cian O'Callaghan (SD)	Aodhán Ó Ríordáin (Lab)	Seán Haughey (FF)	Richard Bruton (FG)
34th	2024	Denise Mitchell (SF)	Cian O'Callaghan (SD)	Barry Heneghan (Ind.)	Tom Brabazon (FF)	Naoise Ó Muirí (FG)
