= List of spouses of the president of Ireland =

The spouse of the president of Ireland is the wife or husband of the president of Ireland. The terms "first lady" and "first gentleman" are not used in any official context.

== List of spouses ==
Image	Name	Dates of marriage	President (spouse)
	Lucy Kurtz	1893–1938	Douglas Hyde (Note: Douglas Hyde was a widower for most of his presidency.)
	Mary Kate Ryan (Note: Mary Kate Ryan and Phyllis Ryan were sisters.)	1918–1934	Seán T. O'Kelly
	Phyllis Ryan	1936–1966	Seán T. O'Kelly
	Sinéad Ní Fhlannagáin	1910–1975	Éamon de Valera
	Ruth Ellen Dow	1925–1950	Erskine H. Childers
	Rita Dudley	1952–1974	Erskine H. Childers
	Máirín Nic Dhiarmada	1943–1978	Cearbhall Ó Dálaigh
	Maeve Finnegan	1955–2008	Patrick Hillery
	Nicholas Robinson	1970–present	Mary Robinson
	Martin McAleese	1976–present	Mary McAleese
	Sabina Coyne	1974–present	Michael D. Higgins
	Brian McEnery	1992–present	Catherine Connolly

== See also ==
- List of spouses or partners of the Taoiseach
