= Maureen Haughey =

Wife of Charles Haughey

- Born: Mary Frances Lemass; 3 September 1925; Dublin, Ireland
- Died: 17 March 2017 (aged 91); Dublin, Ireland
- Resting place: St. Fintan's Cemetery, Sutton, Dublin, Ireland
- Education: University College Dublin
- Known for: Spouse of the Taoiseach (1979–1981, 1982, 1987–1992)
- Spouse: Charles Haughey (m. 1951; died 2006)
- Children: 4, including Seán
- Parents: Seán Lemass; Kathleen Hughes
- Relatives: Noel Lemass (brother); Eileen Lemass (sister-in-law)

Maureen Haughey (née Lemass; 3 September 1925 – 17 March 2017) was the wife of Charles Haughey, who served as Taoiseach on three occasions.

== Biography ==
She was born in Dublin, the eldest daughter of Seán Lemass, the recently elected TD for Dublin South and future Taoiseach, and Kathleen Hughes. After completing her secondary education she was struck down with tuberculosis in 1943. After spending a year recovering in hospital, she later studied at University College Dublin (UCD) where she received a degree in commerce.

During her studies at UCD, she was introduced to Charles Haughey. They married on 18 September 1951. They had four children: Eimear, Conor, Ciarán and Seán.

Her husband was elected as a TD for Dublin North-East in 1957 before later serving in a range of ministerial positions including Justice, Agriculture, Finance, Health and Social Welfare. He was elected leader of Fianna Fáil and Taoiseach in 1979. During her time as wife to the Taoiseach she kept a low profile and had enjoyed a background role in her husband's political career.

Maureen Haughey's brother Noel Lemass also served as a Fianna Fáil TD, while her sister-in-law, Eileen Lemass, also served as a member of Dáil Éireann. Her youngest son, Seán Haughey, has served as Lord Mayor of Dublin and was a TD and has previously been a Minister of State.

After stepping down as Taoiseach in 1992, Charles Haughey's retirement was dogged with controversy, with the Moriarty Tribunal investigating a series of payments that he received from senior businessmen over an 18-year period. At one stage, he faced criminal charges for obstructing the work of the tribunal. He was also found to have spent large sums of Fianna Fáil money on Charvet shirts and dinners at the exclusive Le Coq Hardi restaurant in Dublin. In May 1999, gossip columnist Terry Keane revealed on The Late Late Show that Charles Haughey had conducted a 27-year relationship with her.

Haughey was widowed on 13 June 2006, when her husband died of prostate cancer. They had been married for 55 years. In 2008, she left Abbeville, her home of 39 years. She died on 17 March 2017, aged 91.

== Bibliography ==
- Horgan, John, Seán Lemass - the Enigmatic Patriot. (Gill and Macmillan, Dublin, 1997).
