= Vera McWeeney =

Irish hockey/tennis player and sports journalist

- Born: Veronica Mary Elizabeth Mahony; 21 July 1909; Blarney, County Cork, Ireland
- Died: 9 January 1981 (aged 71); Dublin

Vera McWeeney (21 July 1909 – 9 January 1981) was an Irish hockey and tennis player, and sports journalist.

== Early life and family ==
Vera McWeeney was born Veronica Mary Elizabeth Mahony in Blarney, County Cork on 21 July 1909. She was the youngest of the three children of Francis Walter Mahony and his second wife, Mary ("May") (née Ashlin). Her father was managing director of the family business Martin Mahony & Bros Ltd. She married sports journalist, Arthur McWeeney in 1940. The couple had one daughter and one son. Their son, Myles McWeeney, became a television executive at RTÉ.

== Sports career ==
McWeeney moved to Dublin in her youth, taking up hockey with Maids of the Mountain Hockey Club, with the team winning the Irish Senior Cup in 1930 and 1935. She won her first interprovincial cap for Leinster in 1927, and in 1932 her first Ireland cap. In 1936 she captained Ireland on a tour of the United States, first attending a world hockey conference and then a tournament in Philadelphia where they won two of their five exhibition matches. This was followed by a two-week tour, when they won five of their games. In 1933 she was part of the Ireland team that toured Denmark.

McWeeney was also an accomplished tennis player, considered to play at an international standard. She was a member of the Carrickmines club, winning the East of Ireland tennis championship in 1934 and the County Dublin Championships in 1936 and 1937. She was ranked number four in the 1937 Irish tennis rankings. In 1940 she won her only national tennis title with Norma Stoker in the Irish Close ladies’ doubles championship. She also played badminton, as well as being a skier and skater. Some suggest that she won international caps at squash. She was elected the president of the Irish Ladies Hockey Union in 1951, and served as a senior umpire and international selector for a number of years.

== Journalism career ==
McWeeney started work as a freelance reporter for the Irish Independent following the death of her husband in 1958, writing about ladies’ hockey, tennis, badminton, and squash. She moved to the Irish Times in the early 1960s, writing a column on women's hockey for almost the next two decades. She also wrote about domestic tennis, including all the major tennis events at the Fitzwilliam tennis club as well as covering badminton and squash. She was known for her opinionated and no-nonsense style, not being adverse to entering the male locker rooms.

== Death and legacy ==
McWeeney died suddenly on 9 January 1981, and was buried in Glasnevin Cemetery. The ILHU under-21 provincial tournament is named the Vera McWeeney Cup in her honour. The Vera McWeeney Trophy is a croquet trophy from an annual competition between the Croquet Association of Ireland and their English contemporaries.
