= Seán Kelly (Kerry Gaelic footballer) =

Irish Gaelic footballer

Personal information
- Native name: Seán Ó Ceallaigh (Irish)
- Born: 1925 Kilcummin, County Kerry, Ireland
- Died: 10 August 2012 (aged 87) Glasnevin, Dublin, Ireland
- Occupation: Civil servant
- Height: 5 ft 10 in (178 cm)

Sport
- Sport: Gaelic football
- Position: Full-forward
Clubs
- Years: Club
- Kilcummin; Civil Service
Club titles
- Kerry titles: 0
Inter-county
Years	County	Apps (scores)
1952-1954	Kerry	10 (4-13)
Inter-county titles
- Munster titles: 2
- All-Irelands: 1
- NFL: 0

Seán Kelly (1925 – 10 August 2012), also known as Seán Ó Ceallaigh, was an Irish Gaelic footballer who played at club level with Kilcummin and at inter-county level with the Kerry senior football team. He usually lined out as a forward.

== Career ==
Kelly first came to prominence as a Gaelic footballer with St. Brendan's College in the Munster Colleges Championship, before later lining out at club level with Kilcummin and the Civil Service club in Dublin. His inter-county career began as a 27-year-old when he was first selected for the Kerry senior football team in 1952. Kelly won his only All-Ireland Championship title after lining out at full-forward in a defeat of Armagh in 1953. His other honours include two Munster Championship titles and inclusion on the Munster team for the Railway Cup.

== Personal life and death ==
Born and raised in Kilcummin, County Kerry, Kelly moved to Dublin to work as a civil servant at the age of 18. Living in Clontarf, he later became Secretary-General of the Department of Posts and Telegraphs. Kelly married Eileen O'Hanrahan and they had seven children. His daughter, Fionnuala, married Enda Kenny who served as Taoiseach from 2011 until 2016. His nephew, also Seán Kelly, has served as a Member of the European Parliament.

Kelly died after a brief illness at the Bon Secours Hospital in Glasnevin on 10 August 2012.

== Honours ==
Kerry

- All-Ireland Senior Football Championship: 1953
- Munster Senior Football Championship: 1953, 1954
