= Minister for Supplies =

Former Irish government cabinet minister

- An tAire Soláthairtí
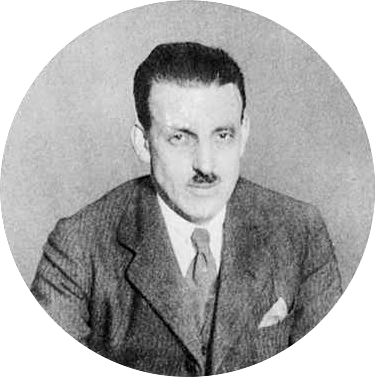
- Department of Supplies
- Member of: Cabinet; Oireachtas
- Reports to: Taoiseach
- Nominator: Taoiseach
- Appointer: President of Ireland on the nomination of the Taoiseach
- Formation: 8 September 1939
- First holder: Seán Lemass
- Final holder: Seán Lemass
- Abolished: 1 August 1945

The minister for supplies (Irish: An tAire Soláthairtí) was created by the Ministers and Secretaries (Amendment) Act 1939, to assist Ireland through World War II, or the Emergency, as it was referred to by the Government of Ireland. Although the legislation creating the new department was not passed until 21 December 1939, it was given retrospective effect, and was deemed to have come into force on 8 September 1939.

The minister for supplies was charged with controlling production, distribution, and pricing of vital supplies during the Emergency. According to the historian Bryce Evans, Minister Seán Lemass introduced full rationing in Ireland 'too late,' ensuring the black market trumped later state attempts at equitable distribution amid the British wartime supply squeeze. Earlier historians had pointed to Lemass's successes in stockpiling essential goods.

The minister's functions were transferred to the minister for industry and commerce on the abolition of the office on 1 August 1945. Lemass had been serving in both positions from 1941.

Name	Term of office		Political party	Governments
Seán Lemass	8 September 1939	1 August 1945	Fianna Fáil	2nd • 3rd • 4th

== See also ==
- Minister for the Co-ordination of Defensive Measures
- Irish neutrality during World War II – International relations
- Irish Mercantile Marine during World War II
