= Noel Lemass =

Irish politician (1929–1976)

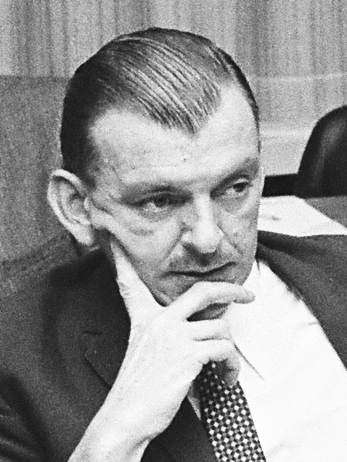
- Lemass in 1971

Parliamentary Secretary
- 1969–1973: Finance

Teachta Dála
- In office November 1956 – 13 April 1976
- Constituency: Dublin South-West

Personal details
- Born: 14 February 1929 Dublin, Ireland
- Died: 13 April 1976 (aged 47) Dublin, Ireland
- Party: Fianna Fáil
- Spouse: Eileen Delaney (m. 1950)
- Relations: Maureen Haughey (sister); Charles Haughey (brother-in-law); Seán Haughey (nephew)
- Children: 4
- Parents: Seán Lemass (father); Kathleen Lemass (mother)
- Education: Catholic University School; Newbridge College

Noel Thomas Lemass (14 February 1929 – 13 April 1976) was an Irish Fianna Fáil politician who served as Parliamentary Secretary to the Minister for Finance from 1969 to 1973. He served as a Teachta Dála (TD) for Dublin South-West from 1956 to 1976.

== Early life ==
Born in Dublin in 1929, Lemass was the son of Seán Lemass, a Fianna Fáil TD, and Kathleen Lemass (née Hughes). He was named after his uncle, a victim of the Irish Civil War in the early 1920s. Lemass was educated at Catholic University School, Leeson Street in Dublin and later at Newbridge College in County Kildare. Against his father's wishes, rather than attend university, he undertook business training and later became an executive member and branch secretary of the Irish Commercial Travellers' Association.

== Political career ==
Lemass followed his father into politics in 1955, when he was elected to Dublin City Council. He was elected to Dáil Éireann in a by-election in Dublin South-West the following year. The by-election was a loss for Fine Gael, who was in government at the time, and whose TD had held the seat for a number of years.

He was active in a number of political councils and other groupings. From 1966 to 1968, he was a member of the Consultative Assembly of the Council of Europe. He was also a member of the Irish-British Parliamentary Group and the Irish-French Parliamentary Group.

In 1969, Lemass was appointed as Parliamentary Secretary to the Minister for Finance, with responsibility for the Board of Works. In his first year in this role, he served under his brother-in-law Charles Haughey, and later under George Colley.

When Fianna Fáil lost office in 1973, Lemass was named spokesperson for physical planning and the environment. He held that position until January 1975, when he was dropped from the front bench.

== Personal life ==
Lemass married Eileen Delaney in 1950, and they had four children. He died on 13 April 1976, at the age of 47. Lemass's wife was a member of Dublin Corporation. She entered the Dáil following the death of her husband.

== See also ==
- Families in the Oireachtas

Political offices
Preceded by Jim Gibbons	Parliamentary Secretary to the Minister for Finance; 1969–1973	Succeeded by Henry Kenny

Dáil	Election	Deputy (Party)	Deputy (Party)	Deputy (Party)	Deputy (Party)	Deputy (Party)
13th	1948	Seán MacBride (CnaP)	Peadar Doyle (FG)	Bernard Butler (FF)	Michael O'Higgins (FG)	Robert Briscoe (FF)
14th	1951	Seán MacBride (CnaP)	Peadar Doyle (FG)	Bernard Butler (FF)	Michael ffrench-O'Carroll (Ind.)	Robert Briscoe (FF)
15th	1954	Seán MacBride (CnaP)	Peadar Doyle (FG)	Bernard Butler (FF)	Michael O'Higgins (FG)	Robert Briscoe (FF)
15th	1956 by-election	Seán MacBride (CnaP)	Noel Lemass (FF)	Bernard Butler (FF)	Michael O'Higgins (FG)	Robert Briscoe (FF)
16th	1957	James Carroll (Ind.)	Noel Lemass (FF)	Bernard Butler (FF)	Michael O'Higgins (FG)	Robert Briscoe (FF)
16th	1959 by-election	James Carroll (Ind.)	Noel Lemass (FF)	Richie Ryan (FG)	Michael O'Higgins (FG)	Robert Briscoe (FF)
17th	1961	James Carroll (Ind.)	Noel Lemass (FF)	Richie Ryan (FG)	James O'Keeffe (FG)	Robert Briscoe (FF)
18th	1965	John O'Connell (Lab)	Noel Lemass (FF)	Richie Ryan (FG)	Joseph Dowling (FF)	Ben Briscoe (FF)
19th	1969	John O'Connell (Lab)	Noel Lemass (FF)	Seán Dunne (Lab)	Joseph Dowling (FF)	4 seats 1969–1977
19th	1970 by-election	John O'Connell (Lab)	Noel Lemass (FF)	Seán Sherwin (FF)	Joseph Dowling (FF)	4 seats 1969–1977
20th	1973	John O'Connell (Lab)	Noel Lemass (FF)	Declan Costello (FG)	Joseph Dowling (FF)	4 seats 1969–1977
20th	1976 by-election	John O'Connell (Lab)	Brendan Halligan (Lab)	Declan Costello (FG)	Joseph Dowling (FF)	4 seats 1969–1977
21st	1977	Constituency abolished. See Dublin Ballyfermot				

Dáil	Election	Deputy (Party)	Deputy (Party)	Deputy (Party)	Deputy (Party)	Deputy (Party)
22nd	1981	Seán Walsh (FF)	Larry McMahon (FG)	Mary Harney (FF)	Mervyn Taylor (Lab)	4 seats 1981–1992
23rd	1982 (Feb)	Seán Walsh (FF)	Larry McMahon (FG)	Mary Harney (FF)	Mervyn Taylor (Lab)	4 seats 1981–1992
24th	1982 (Nov)	Seán Walsh (FF)	Michael O'Leary (FG)	Mary Harney (FF)	Mervyn Taylor (Lab)	4 seats 1981–1992
25th	1987	Seán Walsh (FF)	Chris Flood (FF)	Mary Harney (PDs)	Mervyn Taylor (Lab)	4 seats 1981–1992
26th	1989	Pat Rabbitte (WP)	Chris Flood (FF)	Mary Harney (PDs)	Mervyn Taylor (Lab)	4 seats 1981–1992
27th	1992	Pat Rabbitte (DL)	Chris Flood (FF)	Mary Harney (PDs)	Mervyn Taylor (Lab)	Éamonn Walsh (Lab)
28th	1997	Pat Rabbitte (DL)	Chris Flood (FF)	Mary Harney (PDs)	Conor Lenihan (FF)	Brian Hayes (FG)
29th	2002	Pat Rabbitte (Lab)	Charlie O'Connor (FF)	Seán Crowe (SF)	Conor Lenihan (FF)	4 seats 2002–2016
30th	2007	Pat Rabbitte (Lab)	Charlie O'Connor (FF)	Brian Hayes (FG)	Conor Lenihan (FF)	4 seats 2002–2016
31st	2011	Pat Rabbitte (Lab)	Eamonn Maloney (Lab)	Brian Hayes (FG)	Seán Crowe (SF)	4 seats 2002–2016
31st	2014 by-election	Pat Rabbitte (Lab)	Eamonn Maloney (Lab)	Paul Murphy (AAA)	Seán Crowe (SF)	4 seats 2002–2016
32nd	2016	Colm Brophy (FG)	John Lahart (FF)	Paul Murphy (AAA–PBP)	Seán Crowe (SF)	Katherine Zappone (Ind.)
33rd	2020	Colm Brophy (FG)	John Lahart (FF)	Paul Murphy (S–PBP)	Seán Crowe (SF)	Francis Noel Duffy (GP)
34th	2024	Colm Brophy (FG)	John Lahart (FF)	Paul Murphy (PBP–S)	Seán Crowe (SF)	Ciarán Ahern (Lab)
