= Fionnuala Kenny =

Irish public relations specialist (born 1956)

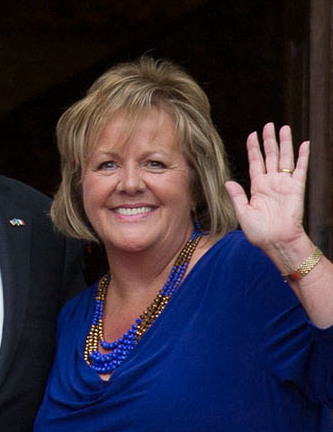
- Born: Fionnuala Bríd O'Kelly; 1 March 1956 (age 70); Clontarf, Dublin, Ireland
- Education: University College Dublin; Nancy-Université
- Known for: Spouse of the Taoiseach (2011–2017)
- Spouse: Enda Kenny (m. 1992)
- Children: 3
- Father: Seán Kelly

Fionnuala Bríd Kenny (née O'Kelly; born 1 March 1956) is an Irish public relations specialist who is the wife of former Taoiseach Enda Kenny. She is a former press officer for the Fianna Fáil Party.

In March 1987, Kenny became the first woman to head the Irish Government Information Service, a position she held until 1990. She then served as the head of public affairs at Raidió Teilifís Éireann (RTÉ), beginning in 1990. She has been described by the media as Kenny's "best asset" and his "secret weapon."

Kenny, the daughter of two civil servants, was born Fionnuala O'Kelly in 1956, in Clontarf, Dublin. She was educated at St Louis College (St Louis Secondary School) in County Monaghan. She then studied French and German, at University College Dublin. O'Kelly received her master's degree in French from Nancy-Université in Nancy, France.

Once she returned to Ireland, she enrolled in a public relations course which was offered by AnCo, an agency which later became part of FÁS. O'Kelly applied for a public relations position, which was advertised in a newspaper for a "national organisation." She only discovered that the organisation mentioned in the employment ad was Fianna Fáil, one of Ireland's two major political parties, once she had been offered a job interview. She won the job, despite an intimidating encounter with Charles Haughey during the interview, and became Fianna Fáil's press officer at Leinster House. She worked under Haughey, the Leader of Fianna Fáil and Taoiseach from 1979 to 1981, 1982, and 1987 to 1992, for much of the next decade. O'Kelly put together the photographs published in "The Spirit of the Nation: the Speeches and Statements of Charles J Haughey (1957-86)," a book edited by Martin Mansergh.

Charles Haughey regained his position as Taoiseach in 1987. In March 1987, Fionnuala O'Kelly was appointed the head the Government Information Service, becoming the first woman to lead the agency.

On the first day of the 31st Dáil on 9 March 2011, Fianna Fáil leader Micheál Martin sent his regards to her in the chamber after her husband was elected Taoiseach. Enda Kenny responded, "Were she still with you today, you might be in a much stronger position today."
