= Seán Lemass =

Taoiseach from 1959 to 1966

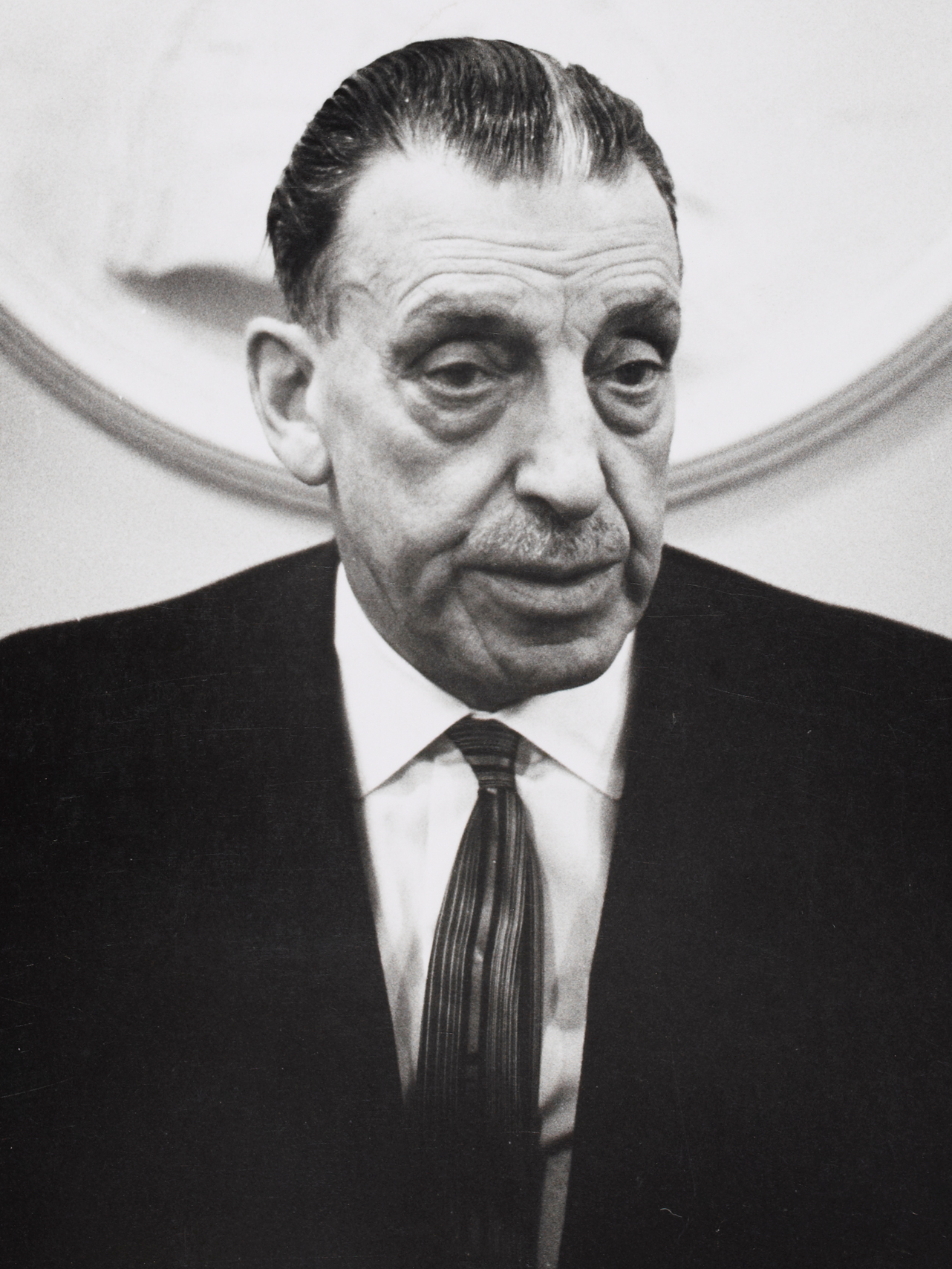
- Lemass in 1966

Taoiseach
- In office 23 June 1959 – 10 November 1966
- President: Seán T. O'Kelly; Éamon de Valera
- Tánaiste: Seán MacEntee; Frank Aiken
- Preceded by: Éamon de Valera
- Succeeded by: Jack Lynch

Leader of Fianna Fáil
- In office 23 June 1959 – 10 November 1966
- Preceded by: Éamon de Valera
- Succeeded by: Jack Lynch

Tánaiste
- In office 20 March 1957 – 23 June 1959
- Taoiseach: Éamon de Valera
- Preceded by: William Norton
- Succeeded by: Seán MacEntee
- In office 13 June 1951 – 2 June 1954
- Taoiseach: Éamon de Valera
- Preceded by: William Norton
- Succeeded by: William Norton
- In office 14 June 1945 – 18 February 1948
- Taoiseach: Éamon de Valera
- Preceded by: Seán T. O'Kelly
- Succeeded by: William Norton

Minister for Industry and Commerce
- In office 20 March 1957 – 23 June 1959
- Taoiseach: Éamon de Valera
- Preceded by: William Norton
- Succeeded by: Jack Lynch
- In office 13 June 1951 – 2 June 1954
- Taoiseach: Éamon de Valera
- Preceded by: Thomas F. O'Higgins
- Succeeded by: William Norton
- In office 18 August 1941 – 18 February 1948
- Taoiseach: Éamon de Valera
- Preceded by: Seán MacEntee
- Succeeded by: Daniel Morrissey
- In office 9 March 1932 – 16 September 1939
- Taoiseach: Éamon de Valera
- Preceded by: Patrick McGilligan
- Succeeded by: Seán MacEntee

Minister for Supplies
- In office 8 September 1939 – 31 July 1945
- Taoiseach: Éamon de Valera
- Preceded by: New office
- Succeeded by: Office abolished

Teachta Dála
- In office February 1948 – June 1969
- Constituency: Dublin South-Central
- In office November 1924 – February 1948
- Constituency: Dublin South

Personal details
- Born: John Francis Lemass; 15 July 1899 Ballybrack, Dublin, Ireland
- Died: 11 May 1971 (aged 71) Phibsborough, Dublin, Ireland
- Resting place: Deansgrange, Dublin, Ireland
- Party: Fianna Fáil
- Spouse: Kathleen Hughes (m. 1924)
- Relations: Charles Haughey (son-in-law); Seán Haughey (grandson); Eileen Lemass (daughter-in-law)
- Children: 4, including Maureen and Noel
- Education: O'Connell School

Seán Francis Lemass (born John Francis Lemass; 15 July 1899 – 11 May 1971) was an Irish Fianna Fáil politician who served as Taoiseach and Leader of Fianna Fáil from 1959 to 1966. He also served as Tánaiste from 1957 to 1959, 1951 to 1954 and 1945 to 1948, Minister for Industry and Commerce from 1957 to 1959, 1951 to 1954, 1941 to 1948 and 1932 to 1939, and Minister for Supplies from 1939 to 1945. He served as a Teachta Dála (TD) from 1924 to 1969.

A veteran of the 1916 Easter Rising, the War of Independence and the Civil War, Lemass was first elected as a Sinn Féin TD for the Dublin South constituency in the November 1924 Dublin South by-election. He was returned at each election until the constituency was abolished in 1948, when he was re-elected for Dublin South-Central until his retirement in 1969. He was a founder-member of Fianna Fáil in 1926 and served as Minister for Industry and Commerce, Minister for Supplies and Tánaiste in successive Fianna Fáil governments.

Lemass's legacy is tied to his efforts in facilitating industrial growth, bringing foreign direct investment into the country, and forging permanent links between Ireland and the European Communities. One of the most important modernizing reforms during Lemass's tenure was the introduction of free secondary education, an initiative that took effect shortly after Lemass retired as Taoiseach.

== Early life and education ==
Lemass was born at Norwood Lodge, Ballybrack, Dublin, on 15 July 1899, the second of seven children born to John T. Lemass and his wife Frances (née Phelan) Lemass. He was baptised at Ss. Alphonsus and Columba Roman Catholic Church, Killiney, six days later, on 21 July 1899. The family operated a hatter-and-outfitter business, and lived at the premises in Capel Street (in Dublin city centre) where Lemass grew up. He was of distant French Huguenot descent. Within the family his name soon changed to Jack and eventually, after 1916, he himself preferred to be called Seán. He was educated at O'Connell School, where he was described as studious. He won a first-class honours exhibition in mathematics in 1915.

One of Lemass's classmates was the popular Irish comedian Jimmy O'Dea. Another friend during his youth was Tom Farquharson, who went on to play as a goalkeeper for Cardiff City. In January 1915, Lemass was persuaded to join the Irish Volunteers. Although he was only fifteen-and-a-half at the time, his mature looks ensured that he would be accepted. He became a member of the A Company of the 3rd Battalion of the Dublin Brigade. The battalion adjutant was Éamon de Valera, future Taoiseach and President of Ireland. While out on a journey in the Dublin mountains during Easter 1916, Lemass and his brother Noel met two sons of Professor Eoin MacNeill. They informed the Lemasses of the Easter Rising that was taking place in the city. On Tuesday 25 April, Seán and Noel Lemass were allowed to join the Volunteer garrison at the General Post Office. Lemass was equipped with a shotgun and was positioned on the roof. He also was involved in fighting on Moore Street. However, by Friday the Rising had ended in failure and all involved were imprisoned. Lemass was held for a month in Richmond Barracks; due to his age, he was released from the 1,783 that were arrested. Following this, Lemass's father wanted his son to continue with his studies and be called to the Irish Bar.

=== Deaths of the Lemass brothers ===
Three of Lemass's brothers died while young. When he was 16, Lemass killed his own baby brother, Herbert, aged twenty-two months, in a domestic shooting accident with a revolver on 28 January 1916. His elder brother, Noel, an anti-Treaty officer, was abducted in June 1923 and murdered the following October, when he was 25; the Lemass family believed that he was killed by pro-Treaty soldier Emmet Dalton. Another of Lemass's brothers, Patrick, died of natural causes at the age of 19 in 1926.

=== Alongside "The Twelve Apostles" ===
Following the Easter Rising, Lemass remained active in the Irish Volunteers, carrying out raids for arms. Until November 1920, Lemass remained a part-time member of the Volunteers. In that month, during the height of the Irish War of Independence, twelve members of the Dublin Brigade of the IRA took part in an attack on British agents living in Dublin, whose names and addresses had been leaked to Michael Collins by his network of spies. The names (Note: The "Twelve Apostles" were Joe Leonard, Seán Doyle, Jim Slattery, Bill Stapleton, Pat McCrae, James Conroy, Ben Barret and Patrick Daly. Mick McDonnell, the first leader, was later succeeded by Daly and, in January 1920, three men were added – Tom Keogh, Mick O'Reilly and Vincent Byrne. Byrne was the last of the "Apostles" to die, in 1992, aged 92.) of those who carried out Collins' orders on the morning of 21 November 1920 were not disclosed until author Tim Pat Coogan mentioned them in his book on the history of the IRA, published in 1970. Coogan identified Lemass as taking part in the killing of a British agent as a member of the "Apostles" assassin squad which killed thirteen (and wounded five other) British agents of the Cairo Gang. That day, 21 November 1920, became known as Bloody Sunday.

Lemass was arrested in December 1920 and interned at Ballykinlar Camp, County Down.

=== Anti-Treaty ===
In December 1921, after the signing of the Anglo-Irish Treaty, Lemass was released. He became a training officer for a period in Beggars Bush Barracks before the IRA split and was involved in the Belfast Boycott operations (see The Troubles in Ulster (1920–1922)). During the debates over the Anglo-Irish Treaty in 1921, Lemass was one of the minority who opposed it along with de Valera. As a protest, all the anti-Treaty side withdrew from the Dáil. In the Irish Civil War which followed, Lemass was adjutant to Rory O'Connor, when the group seized the Four Courts, the site of the High Court of Ireland. The occupation of the Four Courts eventually resulted in the outbreak of the Civil War, when, under British pressure, the Free State side shelled the building on 28 June 1922. As a result, fighting broke out in Dublin between pro- and anti-Treaty factions. The Four Courts surrendered after two days of bombardment; however, Lemass escaped with Ernie O'Malley and some others to Blessington. Their Flying Column operated in Enniscorthy, Tullow, Ferns, Baltinglass and Borris before the Column was broken up. Lemass and O'Malley returned to Dublin along with Thomas Derrig as a member of the IRA Eastern Command Headquarters but were later captured in December 1922 and interned in the Curragh Camp.

In June 1923, after the end of the civil war, Seán Lemass's brother Noel Lemass, an anti-Treaty IRA officer, was abducted in Dublin by a number of men, believed to be connected to the National Army or the Police CID unit. He was held in secret until October when his mutilated body was found in the Dublin Mountains, (see also Executions during the Irish Civil War). Following his brother's death, Seán Lemass was released from prison on compassionate grounds. On 18 November 1924, he was elected for the first time as a Sinn Féin TD.

== Political foundations and ministerial career ==
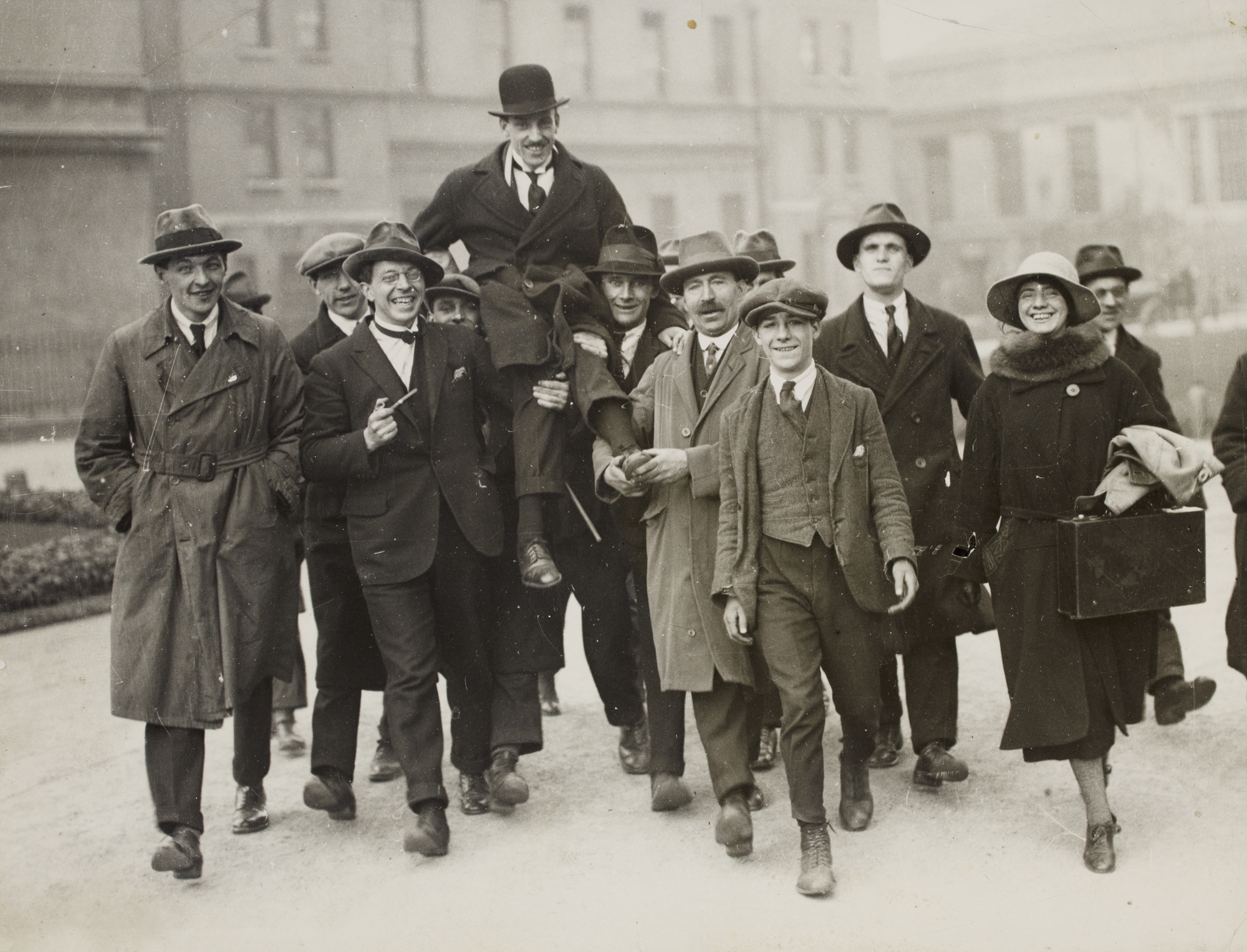
Lemass being carried on the shoulders of some of his supporters following his by-election victory in 1924. It marked the beginning of a decades-long career in Dáil Eireann.

In 1926, de Valera, supported by Lemass, sought to convince Sinn Féin to accept the existence of the Irish Free State and the legitimacy of the Dáil, and to abandon its abstentionist position of refusing to sit in the Dáil if elected. However, their effort was unsuccessful, and in March 1926 both de Valera and Lemass resigned from the party.

At this point, de Valera contemplated leaving public life, a decision that would have changed the course of Irish history. It was Lemass who encouraged him to stay and form a political party. In May, de Valera, assisted by Gerald Boland and Lemass, began to plan the new party, which became known as Fianna Fáil – The Republican Party. (Note: Lemass, the pragmatist, wanted to call the new party simply The Republican Party. De Valera, attached to Gaelic symbolism, insisted on the Irish language name Fianna Fáil ("soldiers of destiny") after contemplating the name Fine Gael (meaning 'family of the Gael', which, ironically, became the name of the main opposition party to Fianna Fáil). The eventual formal name chosen for the new party was a combination of de Valera's Irish and Lemass's English ideas. It was indicative of Lemass's status in 1926 that his preferred choice of name was included in the final title, albeit secondarily to de Valera's chosen name.) Lemass travelled around the country trying to raise support for Fianna Fáil. The vast majority of Sinn Féin TDs were persuaded to join. The new party was strongly opposed to partition but accepted the de facto existence of the Free State, seeking to republicanise it from within. It opposed the controversial Oath of Allegiance and campaigned for its removal.

Due largely to Lemass' organisational skill, most of Sinn Féin's branches defected to Fianna Fáil. This enabled the new party to make a strong showing at the June 1927 election, taking 44 seats while reducing its parent party to only five. More importantly, this was only three seats behind the governing party, Cumann na nGaedheal. Pending the removal of the Oath of Allegiance, the party announced that it would not take up its Dáil seats. A court case was begun in the name of Lemass and others. However, the assassination by the IRA of Kevin O'Higgins, the Vice-President of the Executive Council (deputy prime minister), led to the passing of a new Act requiring all prospective Dáil candidates to take an oath that, if elected, they would swear the Oath of Allegiance; a refusal to do so would prohibit anyone from candidacy in a general or by-election.

Faced with the threat of legal disqualification from politics, de Valera eventually took the Oath of Allegiance while claiming that he was simply signing a slip of paper to gain a right of participation in the Dáil, not actually taking an Oath. On 11 August 1927, having signed the Oath of Allegiance in front of a representative of the Governor-General of the Irish Free State, the TDs from what Lemass described as "a slightly constitutional party" entered the Dáil. The party had another strong showing at a fresh election in September, taking 57 seats.

Lemass was one of the party's stronger performers in opposition, attacking Cumann na nGaedheal as being too pro-British. He also attacked the government's stewardship of the economy, and was largely responsible for drafting Fianna Fáil's economic programme.

=== Minister for Industry and Commerce ===
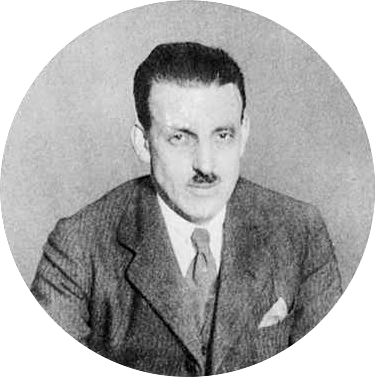
Lemass in 1932

In 1932, Fianna Fáil took office in the Irish Free State, remaining in government for 16 uninterrupted years. The party which Lemass had described as only a "slightly constitutional party" in 1929 (Note: In 1929 Lemass himself was not above resorting to illegal behaviour. He discussed with the IRA the possibility of attacking Remembrance Day ceremonies due to be held in College Green in the centre of Dublin and which drew thousands of people. However, the attack never took place and Lemass broke off contact with the IRA soon afterwards. National Archives of Ireland files.) was now leading the Free State, a state that de Valera and Lemass had fought a civil war to destroy a decade earlier. De Valera appointed Lemass as Minister for Industry and Commerce, one of the more senior cabinet positions in the Executive Council, which he would occupy, with only one short break, in all three of de Valera's governments.

Lemass had the two difficult tasks of developing Irish industry behind his new tariff walls, and convincing the conservative Department of Finance to promote state involvement in industry. Against the background of the Great Depression, he and de Valera engaged in the Anglo-Irish Trade War which lasted from 1933 until 1938, causing severe damage and hardship to the Irish economy and the cattle industry. In 1933, Lemass set up the Industrial Credit Corporation to facilitate investment for industrial development; in the climate of the depression, investment had dried up. A number of semi-state companies, modelled on the success of the ESB, were also set up. These included the Irish Sugar Company, to develop the sugar-beet industry, Turf Development Board for turf development, and an Irish airline, Aer Lingus. Years later Lemass described Aer Lingus as his "proudest achievement".

The Irish market was still too small for multiple companies to exist, so practically all the semi-states had a monopoly on the Irish market. While Lemass concentrated on economic matters, de Valera focused primarily on constitutional affairs, leading to the passage of the new Constitution of Ireland in 1937. De Valera became Taoiseach, while Lemass served in the new Government (the new name for the cabinet) again as Minister for Industry and Commerce.

Subsequently, Irish economic historians have found that many of his decisions on tariffs and licences were made on an ad-hoc basis, with little coherent policy and forward planning.

=== Minister for Supplies ===
Lemass became Minister for Supplies in 1939, following the outbreak of World War II (known in Ireland as The Emergency). It was a crucial role for Ireland, which maintained official neutrality. (Note: Irish neutrality was to a significant extent fiction, as revealed by government papers released years after the war. The Irish government secretly aided the Allies; the date of D-Day, for example, was decided because of weather forecasts from Ireland, which indicated approaching weather systems from the Atlantic, the right weather being crucial to the success of the Normandy Landings.)

The state had to achieve an unprecedented degree of self-sufficiency and it was Lemass's role to ensure this; he had the difficult task of organising what little resources existed. In 1941, the Irish Shipping Company was set up to keep a vital trickle of supplies coming into the country. However, petrol, gas, and some foodstuffs remained in short supply. When Seán T. O'Kelly was elected president of Ireland in 1945, de Valera chose Lemass over older cabinet colleagues to succeed him as Tánaiste.

=== Post-war years ===
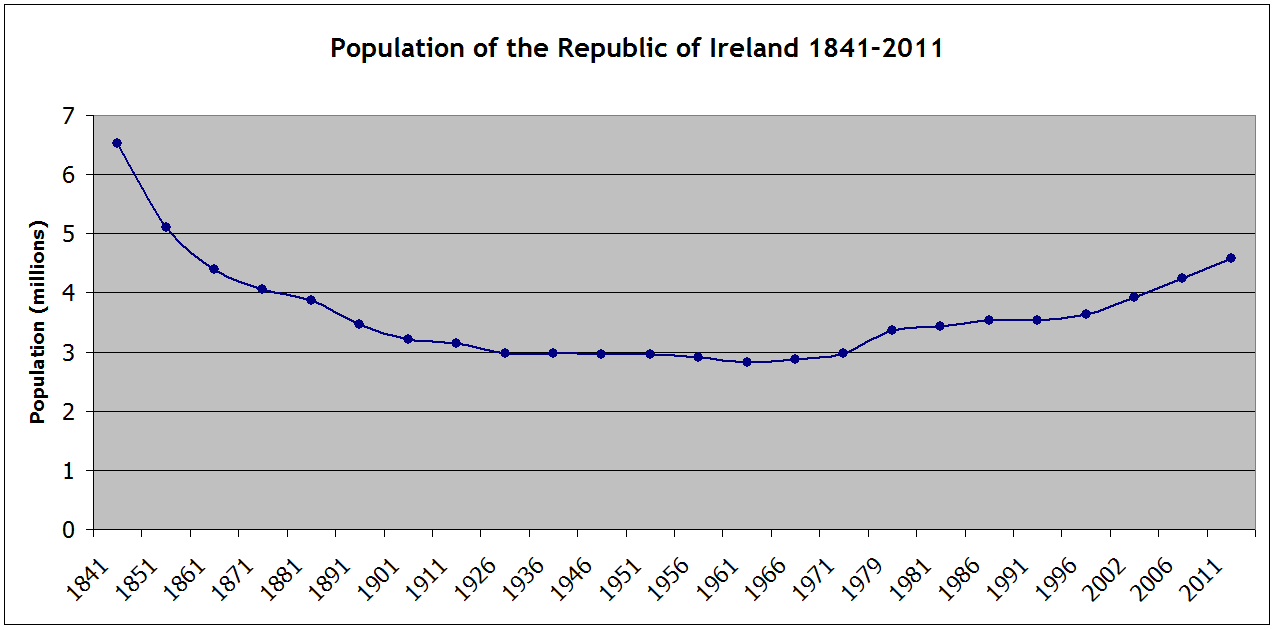

After World War II Lemass sought help from the Marshall Aid Plan, securing $100m that was mainly spent on the road network. Emigration continued, particularly to Britain. Despite a high birth rate, the Republic's population continued to fall until the 1960s (see chart).

In 1948, partly due to its own increasing isolation and also due to a republican backlash against its anti-IRA policies (which during the Emergency had seen the execution of IRA prisoners – in part due to IRA links with the Nazis), which had produced a rival republican party, Clann na Poblachta, Fianna Fáil lost office.

The First Inter-Party government, made up of Fine Gael, the Labour Party, National Labour Party, Clann na Talmhan, Clann na Poblachta and Independents, was formed under Fine Gael TD John A. Costello. In opposition, Lemass played a crucial role in re-organising and streamlining Fianna Fáil. As a result of this, and also due to crises within the Inter-Party government over the controversial Mother and Child Scheme, Fianna Fáil were not long out of government.

In 1951, Fianna Fáil returned to office as a minority government. Lemass again returned as Minister for Industry and Commerce. Lemass believed that a new economic policy was needed, however, de Valera disagreed. Seán MacEntee, the Minister for Finance, tried to deal with the crisis in the balance of payments. He was also unsympathetic to a new economic outlook. In 1954, the government fell and was replaced by the Second Inter-Party government.

Lemass was confined to the Opposition benches for another three years. In 1957, de Valera, at the age of seventy-five, announced to Fianna Fáil that he planned to retire. He was persuaded however to become Taoiseach one more time until 1959 when the office of President of Ireland would become vacant. Lemass returned as Tánaiste and Minister for Industry and Commerce. In 1958, the first Programme for Economic Development was launched. De Valera was elected president in 1959 and retired as Fianna Fáil leader and Taoiseach.

== Taoiseach (1959–1966) ==
On 23 June 1959, Seán Lemass was appointed Taoiseach, on the nomination of Dáil Éireann. Many had wondered if Fianna Fáil could survive without de Valera as leader. However, Lemass quickly established his control over the party. Although he was one of the founding members of Fianna Fáil he was still only fifty-nine years old, seventeen years younger than De Valera.

The change of personnel in Fianna Fáil was also accompanied by a change of personnel in Fine Gael, with James Dillon becoming leader upon Richard Mulcahy's retirement in 1959, and Labour, in which Brendan Corish succeeded William Norton in 1960. A generation of leaders who had dominated Irish politics for over three decades had moved off the stage of history – although neither Fine Gael nor Labour's new leaders initiated major policy changes on the level of Lemass's.

Lemass also initiated several changes in the cabinet. He is credited with providing a transition phase between the old guard and a new generation of professional politicians. Younger men such as Brian Lenihan, Charles Haughey, Patrick Hillery and Donogh O'Malley were all given their first cabinet portfolios by Lemass, and ministers who joined under de Valera, such as Jack Lynch, Neil Blaney and Kevin Boland were promoted by the new Taoiseach. Similarly, several members of the old guard retired from politics during the Lemass era. By 1965, Frank Aiken was the only de Valera veteran remaining in government, and would become the only founder-member of Fianna Fáil to survive Lemass as a member of the government and the Dáil.

The term Lemass era is used by author and academic Brian Girvin to describe the period of economic change between 1959 and 1966. It is so termed because Lemass came from a business background, unlike the more academic and religious de Valera, and this was seen as a factor in the economic turnaround at the time. However, factors other than the leadership of Lemass had a role to play in the change in Ireland at the time – a generation of young politicians born after the Civil War, the presence of T. K. Whitaker in the Department of Finance and the arrival of television all had a role.

During the Lemass era, the IDA greatly refocused its efforts on attracting quality industry, RTÉ was created, whilst population decline and emigration halted somewhat, and the Programme for Economic Expansion was implemented.

The period also saw the destruction of much of Georgian Dublin to make way for modern buildings, and the resettlement of inner-city Dublin communities in new developments such as Ballymun and Tallaght.

=== Economic programmes ===
Lemass summed up his economic philosophy by copying an often-quoted phrase: "A rising tide lifts all boats". By this, he meant that an upsurge in the Irish economy would benefit both the richest and the poorest.

==== First Programme for Economic Expansion ====
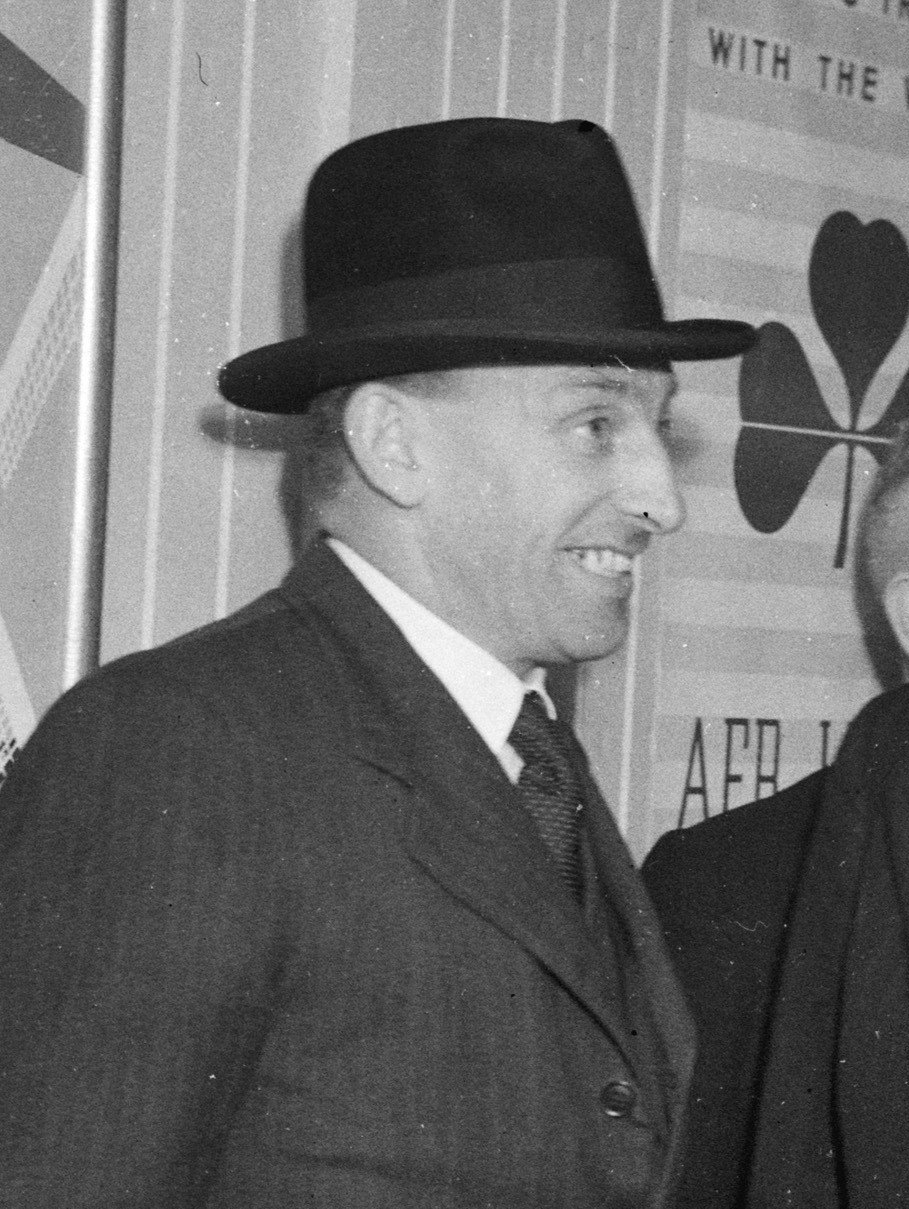
Lemass in 1947

Although the White Paper entitled "Economic Development" was first introduced in 1958 in de Valera's last government, its main recommendations formed the basis for the First Programme for Economic Expansion, which was adopted by Lemass as government policy upon his ascension in 1959.

The programme, which was the brainchild of T. K. Whitaker, involved a move away from the protectionist policies that had been in place since the 1930s. Tax breaks and grants were also to be provided to foreign firms wishing to set up a company in Ireland. The programme also allowed for the spending of £220 million of state capital in investing in an integrated system of national development.

Following the introduction of this programme the policy of protection was eventually ended and the Control of Manufacturers Act, which had been in place since 1932 and had been introduced by Lemass himself, was also abolished. The implementation of the programme coincided with favourable trading conditions, which contributed to the initiative's popularity. However, the government's introduction of a 2.5% turnover tax in 1963, badly damaged the political position, with a by-election of that year reducing the government's majority to one seat. But by the beginning of 1964, another round of by-elections saw a rebound in the government's popularity: in the preceding five years, unemployment had fallen by a third; emigration had reduced considerably and the population grew for the first time since the famine. Agriculture was the only sector which failed to respond to the programme.

Professor Tom Garvin has found that the protectionist policies were first suggested to de Valera by Lemass in a paper written in 1929–30, and then adopted following the change of government in 1932. He considers the proposition that Lemass moved the economy away from free trade in the 1930s, and back into it in the 1960s; a costly mistake that affected many thousands of (non-voting) emigrants.

The programme paved the way for free trade. In 1960, Ireland signed the General Agreement on Tariffs and Trade (GATT), a worldwide agreement to reduce tariffs. In 1961, Ireland applied unsuccessfully for membership in the European Economic Community. Ireland's failure to join was said to be Lemass's biggest regret and disappointment as Taoiseach. Ireland eventually joined in 1973, two years after Lemass's death. The 1965 Merger Treaties paved the way for the signing of the Anglo-Irish Trade Agreement between Lemass's government and Harold Wilson's Labour government.

==== Second Programme for Economic Expansion ====
A Second Programme was launched in 1963, with even more ambitious targets. In particular, the policy focused on expenditures for education, with a doubling of expenditures planned, and high production goals for the dairy industry. Agriculture, which had disappointing results in the First Programme, was understated in the second – a clear break in the Lemass policies from de Valera's longstanding courting of rural voters.

The Second Programme was discontinued in 1967 after Lemass had left office and the programme's goals proved far from completion.

=== Social change ===
As a result of the economic expansion, there was an increase in industrialisation and urbanisation. An increase in prosperity also led to a move away from insularity and conservatism in Irish life. This was facilitated in no small part by the establishment of the state television service, Raidió Teilifís Éireann on 31 December 1961. Television programmes, such as The Late Late Show and imported American and British ones, had a profound effect on a change in attitude. Subjects such as contraception, the Catholic Church and divorce were being discussed openly in a way that previous generations would never have imagined. The pontificate of Pope John XXIII and the Second Vatican Council also had a profound effect on the changing attitudes of Irish Catholics.

In 1963, Ireland saw the first visit of a sitting US President to Ireland, President John F. Kennedy, the great-grandson of an Irish emigrant, came on an official visit. His visit seemed to symbolise a new age for the post-Famine Irish. During his visit Kennedy visited distant relatives in County Wexford, as well as visiting Dublin, Cork, Galway and Limerick. Kennedy later said that his four-day visit to Ireland was one of his most enjoyable. Kennedy later personally invited Lemass back to Washington in October of the same year. One month later the young President Kennedy would be assassinated.

In 1965, a report titled "Investment in Education" was published. After over forty years of independence, the report painted a depressing picture of a system where no changes had taken place. Lemass appointed several young and intelligent men to the post of Minister for Education, including Patrick Hillery and George Colley. Under these people, a slow process of change eventually began to take place.

The most innovative change in education came in 1966 when Donogh O'Malley was appointed Minister. Shortly after taking over O'Malley announced that from 1969 all schools up to Intermediate level (Note: The Intermediate Certificate was an examination taken after three years' study in a secondary school. See Junior Certificate for the modern equivalent.) would be free and free buses would provide transport for the students. This plan had the backing of Lemass; O'Malley, however, never discussed this hugely innovative and expensive plan with any other cabinet ministers, least of all the Minister for Finance Jack Lynch. However, the plan was not expensive in the long term and has continued ever since. O'Malley had died by the time his brainchild came to maturity.

Various improvements in welfare provision were also carried out during the Lemass era. In 1960, old-age pension insurance was introduced for all manual workers and for salaried employees under a certain earnings ceiling, and in 1963, child allowances were extended to the first child. A National Manpower Agency was also established.

=== Northern Ireland ===
The failure of the IRA border campaign in the 1950s and the accession of Lemass as Taoiseach heralded a new policy towards Northern Ireland. Although he was of the staunch republican tradition that rejected partition, he saw clearly that it was unlikely to end in the foreseeable future and that consequently the Republic was better served by disposing of the matter. The new Taoiseach played down the nationalist and anti-partition rhetoric that had done little to further the situation over the previous forty years. Still, as long as the hardline Basil Brooke was Prime Minister of Northern Ireland there was little hope of a rapprochement.

However, in 1963, Terence O'Neill, a younger man with a more pragmatic outlook, succeeded Brooke as Prime Minister. He had years before told Tony Grey of The Irish Times that if he ever succeeded Brooke, he hoped to meet with Lemass. A friendship had developed between O'Neill's secretary, Jim Malley, and the Irish civil servant, T. K. Whitaker. A series of behind-the-scenes negotiations resulted in O'Neill issuing an invitation to Lemass to visit him at Stormont in Belfast.

On 14 January 1965, Lemass travelled to Belfast in the utmost secrecy. The media and even his own cabinet had not been informed until the very last minute. The meeting got a mixed reaction in the North. In the Republic, however, it was seen as a clear indication that the "Irish Cold War" had ended, or at least that a thaw had set in. Lemass returned the invitation on 9 February of the same year by inviting O'Neill to Dublin, but he did not want to be seen to be anti-British. The Irish government encouraged overseas developments with the United States, so that they could share in the 50th-anniversary celebrations of the Easter Rising. The two leaders discussed cooperation between the two states on general economic matters; local services such as road systems and sewage facilities; agriculture, including exempting Northern Ireland from Britain's quota on butter imports from the Republic; customs; and all-Ireland representation in international sporting events. While in 1966 people began to take notice of Ian Paisley's more hard-line speeches, O'Neill was by Ulster standards a "liberal" (Roy Hattersley MP), and Harold Wilson's government decided that there had to be radical change as a consequence of the diplomatic rapprochement with Lemass. The 50th Anniversary of the Easter Rising was celebrated by Insurrection, a TV mini-series commissioned by RTÉ that was later broadcast on the BBC.

The meetings heralded a new (but short-lived) era of optimism, although, for the most part, it was manifested in the Republic. Hardline Northern unionists led by Ian Paisley continued to oppose any dealings with the Republic, and even moderate unionists felt the 50th-anniversary celebrations of Easter Rising in 1966 were insulting to them. The rise of the civil rights campaign and the unionists' refusal to acknowledge it ended the optimism with violence in 1969, after Lemass's term in office had finished.

=== Foreign policy ===
The Lemass era saw some significant developments in Irish foreign policy. Frank Aiken served as Minister for External Affairs during the whole of Lemass's tenure as Taoiseach. At the United Nations, Aiken took an independent stance and backed the admission of China to the organisation, in spite of huge protests from the United States. Admitted only in 1955, Ireland played a large role at the UN, serving on the Security Council in 1962, condemning Chinese aggression in Tibet and advocating nuclear arms limitation. One of the main areas of foreign policy which emerged during the Lemass years was a debate over Ireland's neutrality, a debate that has never been formally resolved, with the de facto policy being to avoid joining military engagements or alliances without neutrality as it's traditionally understood.

Lemass was always sceptical about remaining neutral, particularly if Ireland were to join the European Economic Community. Aiken was much more in favour of a neutral, independent stance. In 1960, Irish troops embarked on their first peace-keeping mission in the First Republic of the Congo. Nine soldiers were killed during this mission.

While Aiken was at the UN, Lemass played a major role in pressing for Ireland's membership of the EEC which in many ways became the chief foreign policy consideration during the 1960s.

== Personal life ==
On 24 August 1924, Lemass married Kathleen Hughes, much to the disapproval of the bride's parents. The wedding took place in the Roman Catholic Church of the Holy Name, Ranelagh, Dublin. Jimmy O'Dea, the well-known comedian, acted as Lemass's best man.

Together Seán and Kathleen had four children – Maureen, Peggy (1927–2004), Noel and Sheila (1932–1997). Maureen Lemass would marry Charles Haughey, a successor of Lemass as Fianna Fáil leader and Taoiseach.

=== Retirement ===
In 1966, Ireland celebrated the 50th anniversary of the 1916 Easter Rising. Éamon de Valera came within 1% of defeat in that year's Irish presidential election, less than two months after the celebrations in which he played such a central part. On 10 November 1966, Lemass announced to the Dáil his decision to retire as Fianna Fáil leader and Taoiseach with his usual penchant for efficiency, "I have resigned". Lemass retired to the backbenches and remained a TD until 1969.

On the day of Lemass's retirement, Jack Lynch became the new leader and became the Taoiseach.

=== Death ===
During the last few years of his leadership, Lemass's health began to deteriorate. He had been a heavy pipe smoker all his life, smoking almost a pound of tobacco a week in later life. At the time of his retirement, it was suspected that Lemass had cancer, but this assumption was later disproved. In February 1971, while attending a rugby game at Lansdowne Road, he became unwell; he was rushed to hospital and was told by his doctor that one of his lungs was about to collapse.

On Tuesday, 11 May 1971, Seán Lemass died in the Mater Hospital in Dublin, aged 71. He was afforded a state funeral and was buried in Deansgrange Cemetery.

== Legacy ==
Lemass remains one of the most highly regarded holders of the office of Taoiseach, being described even by later Fine Gael Taoisigh Garret FitzGerald and John Bruton (Note: Bruton hung a picture of Lemass, as well as Irish Parliamentary Party leader John Redmond, in his office.) as the best holder of the office, and the man whose cabinet leadership style they wished to follow. Some historians have questioned whether Lemass came to the premiership too late, arguing that had he replaced de Valera as Fianna Fáil leader and Taoiseach in 1951 he could have begun the process of reform of Irish society and the industrialisation of Ireland a decade earlier than 1959 when he eventually achieved the top governmental job. Others speculate whether he had been able to achieve some of his policy reforms he initiated in the 1950s precisely because de Valera was still the leader, his opponents being unwilling to challenge him given that he appeared to have de Valera's backing.

What is not in doubt is that Éamon de Valera and Seán Lemass held diametrically different visions of Ireland; de Valera's was of a pastoral rural-based society "given to frugal living", while Lemass had a vision of a modern industrialised society, a member of the European Community. Lemass's coolness towards the revival of the Irish language and intellectual agnosticism also contrasted with de Valera's passionate Gaelicism and commitment to traditional Catholicism.

=== Lemass quotations ===
- 'Fianna Fáil is a slightly constitutional party...but before anything we are a republican party.' (1928)
- 'A rising tide lifts all boats.' (1964, attributed to John F. Kennedy).
- 'The historical task of this generation, as I see it, is to consolidate the economic foundations of our political independence.' (1959)
- 'First and foremost we wish to see the re-unification of Ireland restored. By every test Ireland is one nation with a fundamental right to have its essential unity expressed in its political institutions.' (1960)
- 'The country is, I think, like an aeroplane at the take-off stage. It has become airborne; that is the stage of maximum risk and any failure of power could lead to a crash. It will be a long time before we can throttle back to level flight.' (1961)
- 'A defeatist attitude now would surely lead to defeat...We can't opt out of the future.' (1965)
- 'I regret that time would not stand still for me so that I could go on indefinitely.' (1966)
- 'RTE was set up by legislation as an instrument of public policy, and, as such is responsible to the government.' (1966)

== Governments ==
The following governments were led by Lemass:

- 9th government of Ireland (June 1959 – October 1961)
- 10th government of Ireland (October 1961 – April 1965)
- 11th government of Ireland (April 1965 – November 1966)

== See also ==
- List of people on the postage stamps of Ireland
- Glimmer Man

== Notes ==
Political offices
Preceded by Patrick McGilligan	Minister for Industry and Commerce; 1932–1939	Succeeded by Seán MacEntee
New office	Minister for Supplies; 1939–1945	Office abolished
Preceded by Seán MacEntee	Minister for Industry and Commerce; 1941–1948	Succeeded by Daniel Morrissey
Preceded by Seán T. O'Kelly	Tánaiste; 1945–1948	Succeeded by William Norton
Preceded by William Norton	Tánaiste; 1951–1954	Succeeded by William Norton
Preceded by Thomas F. O'Higgins	Minister for Industry and Commerce; 1951–1954	Succeeded by William Norton
Preceded by William Norton	Tánaiste; 1957–1959	Succeeded by Seán MacEntee
Preceded by William Norton	Minister for Industry and Commerce; 1957–1959	Succeeded by Jack Lynch
Preceded by Éamon de Valera	Taoiseach; 1959–1966	Succeeded by Jack Lynch
Party political offices
Preceded by Éamon de Valera	Leader of Fianna Fáil; 1959–1966	Succeeded by Jack Lynch

Dáil	Election	Deputy (Party)	Deputy (Party)	Deputy (Party)	Deputy (Party)	Deputy (Party)	Deputy (Party)	Deputy (Party)
2nd	1921	Thomas Kelly (SF)	Daniel McCarthy (SF)	Constance Markievicz (SF)	Cathal Ó Murchadha (SF)	4 seats 1921–1923		
3rd	1922	Thomas Kelly (PT-SF)	Daniel McCarthy (PT-SF)	William O'Brien (Lab)	Myles Keogh (Ind.)	4 seats 1921–1923		
4th	1923	Philip Cosgrave (CnaG)	Daniel McCarthy (CnaG)	Constance Markievicz (Rep)	Myles Keogh (Ind.)	Cathal Ó Murchadha (Rep)	Michael Hayes (CnaG)	Peadar Doyle (CnaG)
4th	1923 by-election	Philip Cosgrave (CnaG)	Daniel McCarthy (CnaG)	Constance Markievicz (Rep)	Myles Keogh (Ind.)	Cathal Ó Murchadha (Rep)	Hugh Kennedy (CnaG)	Peadar Doyle (CnaG)
4th	March 1924 by-election	James O'Mara (CnaG)	Daniel McCarthy (CnaG)	Constance Markievicz (Rep)	Myles Keogh (Ind.)	Cathal Ó Murchadha (Rep)	Hugh Kennedy (CnaG)	Peadar Doyle (CnaG)
4th	November 1924 by-election	James O'Mara (CnaG)	Daniel McCarthy (CnaG)	Constance Markievicz (Rep)	Myles Keogh (Ind.)	Cathal Ó Murchadha (Rep)	Seán Lemass (SF)	Peadar Doyle (CnaG)
4th	1925 by-election	James O'Mara (CnaG)	Thomas Hennessy (CnaG)	Constance Markievicz (Rep)	Myles Keogh (Ind.)	Cathal Ó Murchadha (Rep)	Seán Lemass (SF)	Peadar Doyle (CnaG)
5th	1927 (Jun)	James Beckett (CnaG)	Vincent Rice (NL)	Constance Markievicz (FF)	Myles Keogh (Ind.)	Thomas Lawlor (Lab)	Seán Lemass (FF)	Peadar Doyle (CnaG)
5th	1927 by-election	James Beckett (CnaG)	Vincent Rice (NL)	Thomas Hennessy (CnaG)	Myles Keogh (Ind.)	Thomas Lawlor (Lab)	Seán Lemass (FF)	Peadar Doyle (CnaG)
6th	1927 (Sep)	James Beckett (CnaG)	Robert Briscoe (FF)	Thomas Hennessy (CnaG)	Myles Keogh (CnaG)	Frank Kerlin (FF)	Seán Lemass (FF)	Peadar Doyle (CnaG)
7th	1932	James Beckett (CnaG)	Robert Briscoe (FF)	Thomas Hennessy (CnaG)	Myles Keogh (CnaG)	James Lynch (FF)	Seán Lemass (FF)	Peadar Doyle (CnaG)
8th	1933	James Beckett (CnaG)	Robert Briscoe (FF)	James McGuire (CnaG)	Thomas Kelly (FF)	James Lynch (FF)	Seán Lemass (FF)	Peadar Doyle (CnaG)
9th	1937	Myles Keogh (FG)	Robert Briscoe (FF)	Thomas Lawlor (Lab)	Thomas Kelly (FF)	Joseph Hannigan (Ind.)	Seán Lemass (FF)	Peadar Doyle (FG)
10th	1938	James Beckett (FG)	Robert Briscoe (FF)	James Lynch (FF)	Thomas Kelly (FF)	Joseph Hannigan (Ind.)	Seán Lemass (FF)	Peadar Doyle (FG)
10th	1939 by-election	John McCann (FF)	Robert Briscoe (FF)	James Lynch (FF)	Thomas Kelly (FF)	Joseph Hannigan (Ind.)	Seán Lemass (FF)	Peadar Doyle (FG)
11th	1943	Maurice Dockrell (FG)	Robert Briscoe (FF)	James Lynch (FF)	James Larkin Jnr (Lab)	John McCann (FF)	Seán Lemass (FF)	Peadar Doyle (FG)
12th	1944	Maurice Dockrell (FG)	Robert Briscoe (FF)	James Lynch (FF)	James Larkin Jnr (Lab)	John McCann (FF)	Seán Lemass (FF)	Peadar Doyle (FG)
13th	1948	Constituency abolished. See Dublin South-Central, Dublin South-East and Dublin South-West.						

Dáil	Election	Deputy (Party)	Deputy (Party)	Deputy (Party)	Deputy (Party)	Deputy (Party)
22nd	1981	Niall Andrews (FF)	Séamus Brennan (FF)	Nuala Fennell (FG)	John Kelly (FG)	Alan Shatter (FG)
23rd	1982 (Feb)	Niall Andrews (FF)	Séamus Brennan (FF)	Nuala Fennell (FG)	John Kelly (FG)	Alan Shatter (FG)
24th	1982 (Nov)	Niall Andrews (FF)	Séamus Brennan (FF)	Nuala Fennell (FG)	John Kelly (FG)	Alan Shatter (FG)
25th	1987	Tom Kitt (FF)	Séamus Brennan (FF)	Anne Colley (PDs)	John Kelly (FG)	Alan Shatter (FG)
26th	1989	Tom Kitt (FF)	Séamus Brennan (FF)	Nuala Fennell (FG)	Roger Garland (GP)	Alan Shatter (FG)
27th	1992	Tom Kitt (FF)	Séamus Brennan (FF)	Liz O'Donnell (PDs)	Eithne FitzGerald (Lab)	Alan Shatter (FG)
28th	1997	Tom Kitt (FF)	Séamus Brennan (FF)	Liz O'Donnell (PDs)	Olivia Mitchell (FG)	Alan Shatter (FG)
29th	2002	Tom Kitt (FF)	Séamus Brennan (FF)	Liz O'Donnell (PDs)	Olivia Mitchell (FG)	Eamon Ryan (GP)
30th	2007	Tom Kitt (FF)	Séamus Brennan (FF)	Alan Shatter (FG)	Olivia Mitchell (FG)	Eamon Ryan (GP)
30th	2009 by-election	Tom Kitt (FF)	George Lee (FG)	Alan Shatter (FG)	Olivia Mitchell (FG)	Eamon Ryan (GP)
31st	2011	Shane Ross (Ind.)	Peter Mathews (FG)	Alan Shatter (FG)	Olivia Mitchell (FG)	Alex White (Lab)
32nd	2016	Constituency abolished. See Dublin Rathdown, Dublin South-West and Dún Laoghaire.				

Dáil	Election	Deputy (Party)	Deputy (Party)	Deputy (Party)	Deputy (Party)	Deputy (Party)
13th	1948	Seán Lemass (FF)	James Larkin Jnr (Lab)	Con Lehane (CnaP)	Maurice E. Dockrell (FG)	John McCann (FF)
14th	1951	Seán Lemass (FF)	James Larkin Jnr (Lab)	Philip Brady (FF)	Maurice E. Dockrell (FG)	John McCann (FF)
15th	1954	Seán Lemass (FF)	James Larkin Jnr (Lab)	Thomas Finlay (FG)	Maurice E. Dockrell (FG)	Celia Lynch (FF)
16th	1957	Seán Lemass (FF)	Jack Murphy (Ind.)	Philip Brady (FF)	Maurice E. Dockrell (FG)	Celia Lynch (FF)
16th	1958 by-election	Seán Lemass (FF)	Patrick Cummins (FF)	Philip Brady (FF)	Maurice E. Dockrell (FG)	Celia Lynch (FF)
17th	1961	Seán Lemass (FF)	Patrick Cummins (FF)	Philip Brady (FF)	Maurice E. Dockrell (FG)	Joseph Barron (CnaP)
18th	1965	Seán Lemass (FF)	Frank Cluskey (Lab)	Philip Brady (FF)	Maurice E. Dockrell (FG)	Thomas J. Fitzpatrick (FF)
19th	1969	Richie Ryan (FG)	Ben Briscoe (FF)	Philip Brady (FF)	John O'Donovan (Lab)	4 seats 1969–1977
20th	1973	Richie Ryan (FG)	Ben Briscoe (FF)	Philip Brady (FF)	John Kelly (FG)	4 seats 1969–1977
21st	1977	Fergus O'Brien (FG)	Frank Cluskey (Lab)	Thomas J. Fitzpatrick (FF)	3 seats 1977–1981	
22nd	1981	Fergus O'Brien (FG)	Ben Briscoe (FF)	Thomas J. Fitzpatrick (FF)	Gay Mitchell (FG)	John O'Connell (Note: O'Connell served as Ceann Comhairle in the 22nd and 23rd Dáil from 1981 to 1983 and was returned automatically at the February 1982 and November 1982 general elections. He joined Fianna Fáil in January 1985.) (Ind.)
23rd	1982 (Feb)	Frank Cluskey (Lab)	Ben Briscoe (FF)	Thomas J. Fitzpatrick (FF)	Gay Mitchell (FG)	John O'Connell (Ind.)
24th	1982 (Nov)	Frank Cluskey (Lab)	Ben Briscoe (FF)	Fergus O'Brien (FG)	Gay Mitchell (FG)	John O'Connell (Ind.)
25th	1987	Frank Cluskey (Lab)	Ben Briscoe (FF)	Fergus O'Brien (FG)	Gay Mitchell (FG)	Mary Mooney (FF)
26th	1989	John O'Connell (FF)	Ben Briscoe (FF)	Fergus O'Brien (FG)	Gay Mitchell (FG)	Eric Byrne (WP)
27th	1992	John O'Connell (FF)	Ben Briscoe (FF)	Pat Upton (Lab)	Gay Mitchell (FG)	4 seats 1992–2002
27th	1994 by-election	Eric Byrne (DL)	Ben Briscoe (FF)	Pat Upton (Lab)	Gay Mitchell (FG)	4 seats 1992–2002
28th	1997	Seán Ardagh (FF)	Ben Briscoe (FF)	Pat Upton (Lab)	Gay Mitchell (FG)	4 seats 1992–2002
28th	1999 by-election	Seán Ardagh (FF)	Ben Briscoe (FF)	Mary Upton (Lab)	Gay Mitchell (FG)	4 seats 1992–2002
29th	2002	Seán Ardagh (FF)	Aengus Ó Snodaigh (SF)	Mary Upton (Lab)	Gay Mitchell (FG)	Michael Mulcahy (FF)
30th	2007	Seán Ardagh (FF)	Aengus Ó Snodaigh (SF)	Mary Upton (Lab)	Catherine Byrne (FG)	Michael Mulcahy (FF)
31st	2011	Eric Byrne (Lab)	Aengus Ó Snodaigh (SF)	Joan Collins (PBP)	Catherine Byrne (FG)	Michael Conaghan (Lab)
32nd	2016	Bríd Smith (AAA–PBP)	Aengus Ó Snodaigh (SF)	Joan Collins (Note: Founded Right to Change in May 2020.) (I4C)	Catherine Byrne (FG)	4 seats from 2016
33rd	2020	Bríd Smith (S–PBP)	Aengus Ó Snodaigh (SF)	Joan Collins (I4C)	Patrick Costello (GP)	4 seats from 2016
34th	2024	Catherine Ardagh (FF)	Aengus Ó Snodaigh (SF)	Máire Devine (SF)	Jen Cummins (SD)	4 seats from 2016
