= Eileen Lemass =

Irish former politician (born 1932)

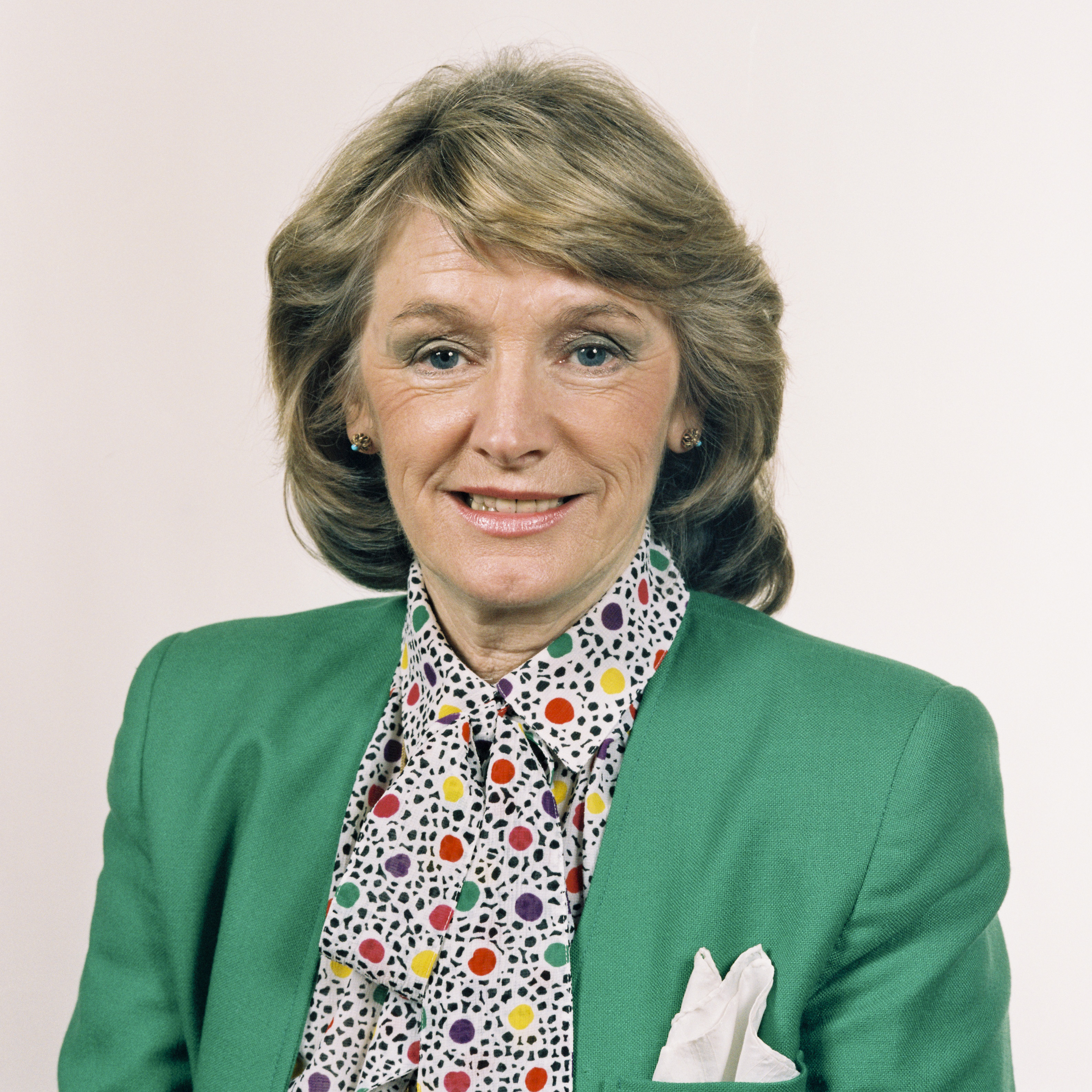

Member of the European Parliament
- In office June 1984 – July 1989
- Constituency: Dublin

Teachta Dála
- In office November 1982 – February 1987
- In office June 1981 – February 1982
- Constituency: Dublin West
- In office June 1977 – June 1981
- Constituency: Dublin Ballyfermot

Personal details
- Born: Eileen Delaney; 7 July 1932 (age 94) Cork, Ireland
- Party: Fianna Fáil
- Spouse: Noel Lemass
- Children: 4
- Relatives: Seán Lemass (father-in-law)
- Education: National College of Art

Eileen Lemass (née Delaney; born 7 July 1932) is an Irish former Fianna Fáil politician, who served as a Teachta Dála (TD) from 1977 to 1987, and also as a member of the European Parliament from 1984 to 1989.

== Early life and education ==
She was born in Cork in 1932, and was educated at St. Kevin's School, the National College of Art, Grafton Academy of Dress Designing and the Abbey Theatre School of Acting.

== Political career ==
She became involved in politics in 1974 when she was first elected to Dublin City Council. In 1976 she unsuccessfully contested the by-election in Dublin South-West caused by the death of her 47-year-old husband Noel Lemass, son of former Taoiseach Seán Lemass and brother-in-law of future Taoiseach Charles Haughey.

She was first elected to Dáil Éireann for Dublin Ballyfermot at the 1977 general election. Lemass was elected again at the 1981 general election, this time for Dublin West, but lost her Dáil seat in February 1982.

She was an unsuccessful candidate at the May 1982 Dublin West by-election, but won re-election in that year's second general election in November 1982. Two years later in 1984, she was elected to the European Parliament for the Dublin constituency. She served as the chair of the Committee on Youth, Culture, Education, Information and Sport from 1987 to 1989.

In 1982, Lemass opposed pressure that the European Economic Community was placing on Ireland, Greece, and Belgium to legalise abortion. Speaking to the Irish Times, Lemass said, “It is lucky that Ireland has adopted the constitutional amendment to protect the life of the unborn. These moves bear out the claims of pro-amendment people that pressure to allow abortions in Ireland is coming from the European Parliament.”

She retired from domestic politics at the 1987 election and from European politics in 1989 when she lost her European seat.

Dáil	Election	Deputy (Party)	Deputy (Party)	Deputy (Party)
21st	1977	John O'Connell (Lab)	Eileen Lemass (FF)	Jim Mitchell (FG)
22nd	1981	Constituency abolished		

Dáil	Election	Deputy (Party)	Deputy (Party)	Deputy (Party)	Deputy (Party)	Deputy (Party)
22nd	1981	Jim Mitchell (FG)	Brian Lenihan Snr (FF)	Richard Burke (FG)	Eileen Lemass (FF)	Brian Fleming (FG)
23rd	1982 (Feb)	Jim Mitchell (FG)	Brian Lenihan Snr (FF)	Richard Burke (FG)	Liam Lawlor (FF)	Brian Fleming (FG)
23rd	1982 by-election	Jim Mitchell (FG)	Brian Lenihan Snr (FF)	Liam Skelly (FG)	Liam Lawlor (FF)	Brian Fleming (FG)
24th	1982 (Nov)	Jim Mitchell (FG)	Brian Lenihan Snr (FF)	Liam Skelly (FG)	Eileen Lemass (FF)	Tomás Mac Giolla (WP)
25th	1987	Jim Mitchell (FG)	Brian Lenihan Snr (FF)	Pat O'Malley (PDs)	Liam Lawlor (FF)	Tomás Mac Giolla (WP)
26th	1989	Jim Mitchell (FG)	Brian Lenihan Snr (FF)	Austin Currie (FG)	Liam Lawlor (FF)	Tomás Mac Giolla (WP)
27th	1992	Joan Burton (Lab)	Brian Lenihan Snr (FF)	Austin Currie (FG)	Liam Lawlor (FF)	4 seats 1992–2002
27th	1996 by-election	Joan Burton (Lab)	Brian Lenihan Jnr (FF)	Austin Currie (FG)	Liam Lawlor (FF)	4 seats 1992–2002
28th	1997	Joe Higgins (SP)	Brian Lenihan Jnr (FF)	Austin Currie (FG)	Liam Lawlor (FF)	4 seats 1992–2002
29th	2002	Joe Higgins (SP)	Brian Lenihan Jnr (FF)	Joan Burton (Lab)	3 seats 2002–2011	
30th	2007	Leo Varadkar (FG)	Brian Lenihan Jnr (FF)	Joan Burton (Lab)	3 seats 2002–2011	
31st	2011	Leo Varadkar (FG)	Brian Lenihan Jnr (FF)	Joan Burton (Lab)	Joe Higgins (SP)	4 seats 2011–2024
31st	2011 by-election	Leo Varadkar (FG)	Patrick Nulty (Lab)	Joan Burton (Lab)	Joe Higgins (SP)	4 seats 2011–2024
31st	2014 by-election	Leo Varadkar (FG)	Ruth Coppinger (SP)	Joan Burton (Lab)	Joe Higgins (SP)	4 seats 2011–2024
32nd	2016	Leo Varadkar (FG)	Ruth Coppinger (AAA–PBP)	Joan Burton (Lab)	Jack Chambers (FF)	4 seats 2011–2024
33rd	2020	Leo Varadkar (FG)	Paul Donnelly (SF)	Roderic O'Gorman (GP)	Jack Chambers (FF)	4 seats 2011–2024
34th	2024	Emer Currie (FG)	Paul Donnelly (SF)	Roderic O'Gorman (GP)	Jack Chambers (FF)	Ruth Coppinger (PBP–S)
