= Maud (given name) =

Maud or Maude (approximately pronounced /mɔːd/ in English) derived from the Old French name Mahaut for Matilda. It originated in Old High German and consisted of the two words 'maht' (= power, powerful) and 'hiltja' (= battle). Its meaning is thus "powerful battler" or "powerful in battle".

It is a variant of the given name Matilda, but is uncommon as a surname. The Welsh variant of this name is Mawd.

The name's popularity in 19th-century England is associated with Alfred Tennyson's poem Maud.

== People with the name include ==
=== Royalty and nobility ===
- Maud, Countess of Huntingdon (c. 1074–1130), Queen of Alba as the wife of King David I of Scotland
- Maud, 2nd Countess of Huntingdon (1074–1130), daughter of Waltheof, Earl of Northumbria and heir to his earldom of Huntingdon
- Empress Matilda, (1102–1169), also known as "Mahaut", "Maud" or "Maude", daughter of King Henry I of England and mother to King Henry II of England
- Maud Angelica Behn (born 2003), member of the Norwegian royal family
- Maud Carnegie, Countess of Southesk (1893–1945), née Lady Maud Duff, titled Princess Maud from 1905 to 1923, a member of the British Royal Family
- Maud de Badlesmere (1310–1366), English noblewoman and Countess of Oxford
- Maud de Clare (1276–1327), Baroness de Clifford and Baroness de Welles by marriage
- Maud de Lacy (1230–1304), Baroness Geneville
- Maud de Lacy (1223–1289), Countess of Gloucester
- Maud de Prendergast (c. 1242 – 1273), Norman-Irish noblewoman and Lady of Offaly
- Maud Francis (c. 1370 – 1424), English noblewoman and Countess of Salisbury
- Maud Green, Lady Parr (c. 1490/92 – 1531), English noblewoman and the mother of Katherine Parr, the sixth and final wife of King Henry VIII
- Maud Herbert, the eldest daughter of William Herbert, 1st Earl of Pembroke, who intended to marry her to Henry, Earl of Richmond, the later Henry VII
- Maud le Vavasour (1176–1225), Irish noblewoman and Baroness Butler
- Maud of Apulia (c. 1060 – 1112), Countess of Barcelona
- Matilda of Flanders, (c. 1031 – 1083), also known as "Maud", Queen of England and Duchess of Normandy by marriage to William the Conqueror
- Maud of Gloucester (died 1189), Countess of Chester
- Maud of Lancaster (c. 1310 – 1377), Countess of Ulster
- Maud of Normandy (died 1006)
- Maud of Savoy (1125–1158), first Queen Consort of Portugal
- Maud of Wales (1869–1938), also known as Maud, Queen of Norway, a member of the British Royal Family
- Maud Palmer, Countess of Selborne (1858–1950), wife of William Palmer, 2nd Earl of Selborne and suffragist
- Maud Parr, Lady Lane (c. 1507 – 1558), English courtier and gentlewoman to Queen Katherine Parr, her cousin
- Maud Petty-Fitzmaurice, Marchioness of Lansdowne (1850–1932), British aristocrat and Vicereine of India

=== Arts ===
- Maud Adams (born 1945), Swedish actress
- Maud Aiken (1898–1978), Irish musician and director of the Municipal School of Music in Dublin
- Maud Allan (1873–1956), Canadian dancer and choreographer
- Maude Apatow (born 1997), American actress
- Maud Tindal Atkinson (1875–1954), British painter
- Maud Bodkin (1875–1967), English classical scholar
- Maud Boyd (1867–1929), British actress and singer
- Maud Cressall (1886–1962), British stage and silent film actress
- Maud Diver (1867– 1945), English author in British India who wrote novels, short stories, biographies and journalistic pieces on Indian topics and about the English in India
- Maud Durbin (1871–1936), American actress and writer
- Maud Howe Elliott (1854–1948), American novelist and Pulitzer Prize winner
- Maude Fealy (1883–1971), American stage and silent film actress
- Maud Forget (born 1982), French actress
- Maud Franklin (1857–1939), British painter and mistress of and model for artist James McNeill Whistler
- Maud Frère (1923–1979), Belgian novelist
- Maud Gatewood (1934–2004), American painter
- Maud Hansson (1937–2020), Swedish actress
- Maud Cuney Hare (1874–1936), American pianist and musicologist
- Maud Hawinkels (born 1976), Dutch television presenter
- Maud Hobson (1860 –1913), Australian-born English actress and burlesque performer
- Maud Humphrey (1868–1940), American commercial illustrator and watercolorist
- Maud Hyttenberg (1920–2009), Swedish actress
- Maud Jeffries (1869–1946), American actress and popular subject of theatrical post-cards and photographs
- Maud Lewis (1903–1970), Canadian folk artist
- Maud Karpeles (1885–1976), British collector of folksongs and dance teacher
- Maud Hart Lovelace (1892–1980), American writer
- Alice Maud Krige (born 1954), South African actress and producer
- Maud MacCarthy (Swami Omananda Puri; 1882–1967), Irish violinist, singer, writer, poet, esoteric teacher and authority on Indian music
- Maud Madison (1870–1953), American actress and dancer
- Maud Mary Brindley (1866–1939), English artist and suffragette
- Maud Meyer, Sierra Leonean Nigerian jazz singer
- Lucy Maud Montgomery (1874–1942), Canadian writer
- Maud Molyneux (1948 –2008), French transgender actress, journalist, costume designer and activist
- Maud Morgan (1860–1941), American harpist
- Maud Morgan (1903–1999), American modern and abstract expressionist artist and art teacher
- Maud Mulder (born 1981), Dutch singer who placed second in TV series Idols Netherlands
- Maud Naftel (1856–1891), English watercolour painter
- Maud Powell (1867–1920), American violinist
- Maud Julia Augusta Russell (1891–1982), British socialite and art patron
- Maud Hunt Squire (1873–1954), American painter and printmaker
- Maud Sulter (1960–2008), Scottish fine artist and photographer
- Maud Wagner (1877–1961), American circus performer and tattoo artist
- Maud Welzen (born 1993), Dutch model
- Maud Wyler (born 1982), French actress

=== Politics and activism ===
- Maud Ball, British politician
- Maud Bregeon (born 1991), French politician
- Maud Adeline Cloudesley Brereton (1872–1946), British feminist and sanitary reformer
- Maud Burnett (1863–1950), British politician who served as the first female mayor of Tynemouth
- Maud Gatel, French politician of the Democratic Movement
- Maud Gonne (1866–1953), English-born Irish revolutionary, feminist, actress and long-time poetic inspiration to William Butler Yeats
- Maud Olivier (born 1953), French politician
- Maud Olofsson (born 1955), Swedish politician and former leader of the Swedish Centre Party
- Maud Ingersoll Probasco (1864– 1936), American suffragist and animal rights activist
- Maud Thompson (1870–1962), American suffragist, women's rights activist and teacher
- Maud von Ossietzky (1888–1974), Anglo-Indian suffragette and political activist in Germany
- Maud Wood Park (1871–1955), American suffragist and women's rights activist
- Maud Woodward (1885–1965), American politician

=== Sport ===
- Maud Banks (1879–1967), English-born American tennis player
- Maud Berglund (1934–2000), Swedish freestyle swimmer
- Maud Coutereels (born 1986), Belgian football midfielder
- Maud Fontenoy (born 1977), French sailor known for rowing across the Atlantic and Pacific oceans
- Maud Galtier (1913–2014), French tennis player
- Maud Herbert (born 1974), French windsurfer
- Maud Le Car (born 1992), Saint Martin-born French professional surfer and model
- Maud Megens (born 1996), Dutch water polo player
- Maud Medenou (born 1990), French basketball player
- Maud Muir (born 2001), English rugby union player
- Maud Roetgering (born 1992), Dutch footballer defender
- Maud Rosenbaum (1902–1981), Italian-American track-and-field athlete and tennis player
- Maud Titterton (1867–1932), British golfer
- Maud van der Meer (born 1992), Dutch competitive swimmer

=== Other ===
- Maud Chadburn (1868–1957), British surgeon
- Maud Cunard (1872–1948), American society hostess
- Maud Cunnington (1869–1951), Welsh archaeologist
- Maud de Boer-Buquicchio (born 1944), Dutch jurist
- Maud Darwin (1861–1947), American socialite
- Maud Frizon (born 1941), French shoe designer
- Maud Galt (c. 1620 – c. 1670), Scottish woman accused of witchcraft
- Maud Callaway Hays (b. 1906), American clubwoman and genealogist
- Maud McCarthy (1859–1949), nursing sister and British Army matron-in-chief
- Maud Menten (1879–1960), Canadian physician-scientist who made significant contributions to enzyme kinetics and histochemistry
- Maud Oakes (1903–1990), American ethnologist and writer who published research about the cultures of indigenous tribes in the Americas
- Maud Sellers (1861–1939), British historian and museum curator
- Maud Slye (1879 –1954), American pathologist
- Maud West (1880–13 March 1964), British detective
- Maud Wilde (1880–1965), American physician, organizational founder, and author

=== Fictional ===
- Maud, supporting protagonist of the webcomic Acception
- Maud, secondary character in the 2011 French animated film A Monster in Paris, voiced by Ludivine Sagnier
- Maud, revenge seeking mule in the comic strip And Her Name Was Maud, which first appeared in Hearst newspapers in 1904 and was written by Frederick Burr Opper; and in the 1916 animated film adaption
- Maud, werecat in the fantasy book series The Inheritance Cycle, written by Christopher Paolini
- Maud Bailey, main character in the 1990 Booker Prize for Fiction winning novel Possession, written by A. S. Byatt; and in the 2002 film adaption, where she is played by Gwyneth Paltrow; and in BBC Radio 4's Woman's Hour serialised radio play adaption, where she is voiced by Jemma Redgrave
- Maud Bagshaw, Dowager Baroness Bagshaw, character in the British period drama Downton Abbey, played by Imelda Staunton
- Maud Beaton, character in the second series of HBO drama The Gilded Age, played by Nicole Brydon Bloom
- Maud Brewster, the romantic interest of protagonist Humphrey Van Weyden in the 1904 adventure novel The Sea-Wolf, written by Jack London; also in the numerous film adaptions of the book
- Maud Martha Brown, titular character in the 1953 novel Maud Martha, written by Pulitzer Prize winning African American poet Gwendolyn Brooks
- Maud Grimes, wheelchair-using pensioner in the British soap Coronation Street, played by Elizabeth Bradley
- Maud Gunneson, character in the TV series Penny Dreadful, played by Hannah Tointon
- Maud Horsham, widowed grandmother living with Alzheimer's disease who investigates a double mystery in the 2019 BBC drama series Elizabeth Is Missing, played by Glenda Jackson (present) and Liv Hill (younger)
- Maud Lilly, one of the central characters in the 2002 historical crime novel Fingersmith, written by Welsh novelist Sarah Waters; and in the 2005 BBC TV adaptation Fingersmith, where she was played by Elaine Cassidy
- Maud MacMuckle, also known as Ever Madder Aunt Maud, one of the principal characters in the Eddie Dickens trilogy of children's books, written by Philip Ardagh
- Maud Muller, titular subject of the 1856 poem, written by American Quaker poet John Greenleaf Whittier
- Maud O'Hara, character in the 2024 Disney+ series Rivals, played by Victoria Smurfit
- Maud Pie, older sister of Pinkie Pie from the My Little Pony: Friendship Is Magic episode of the same name, voiced by Ingrid Nilson
- Maud Silver, a retired governess-turned-private detective featured in 32 novels written by Patricia Wentworth
- Maud Smith, character in the 1913 American silent short comedy film Almost a Rescue, played by Billie Bennett
- Maud Spellbody, Mildred's best friend in The Worst Witch children's book series, written by Jill Murphy
- Maud Watts, working class suffragette and central character in the 2015 film Suffragette (film), played by Carey Mulligan
- Katie/Maud, central character in the 2019 British psychological horror film Saint Maud, played by Morfydd Clark

== See also ==
- Matilda (disambiguation)
- Maude (disambiguation)
- Maudie (disambiguation)
- Princess Maud (disambiguation)
- Queen Maud (disambiguation)
