= Matilda (given name) =

Mathilda
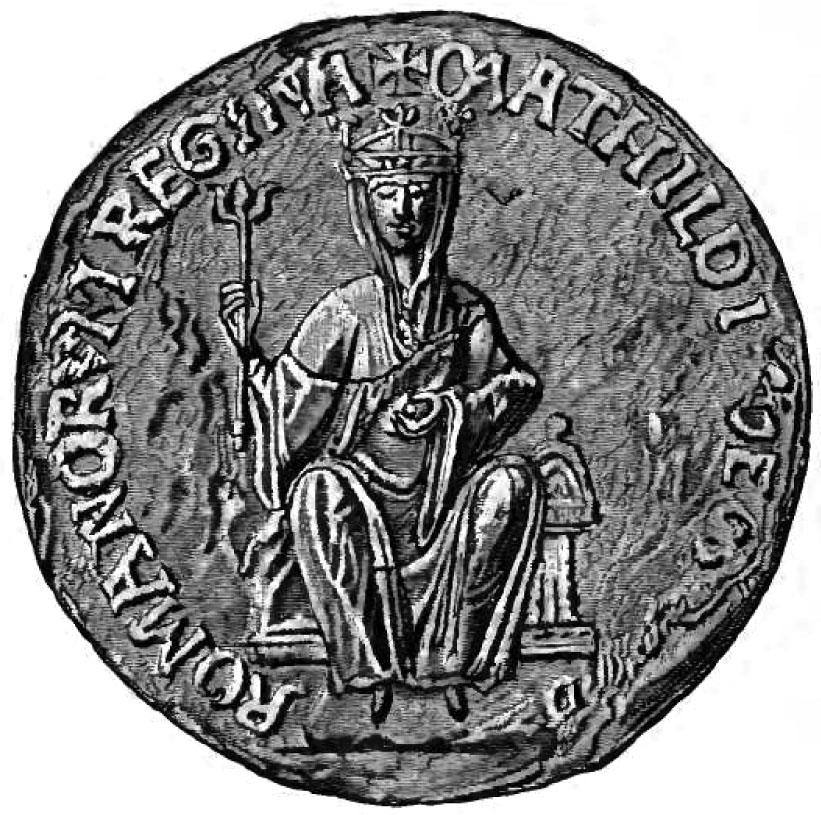
- Seal of Empress Matilda, claimant to the English throne between 1141 and 1148
- Pronunciation: [məˌtɪldə]
- Gender: Feminine

Origin
- Meaning: Mighty in battle

Other names
- Related names: Matilde, Mathilde, Tilda, Maud

Matilda, also spelled Mathilda and Martilda, is the English and Latin form of the Germanic female name Mahthildis, which derives from the Old High German "maht" (meaning "might and strength") and "hild" (meaning "battle").

== Translations ==
- Mahthildis (Ancient Germanic)
- Matylda, Tylda (Czech)
- Mathilde, Tilde, Tille (Danish)
- Mathilde, Machteld, Mechteld (Dutch)
- Mathilda, Matilda, Martilda, Marthilda, Matti, Mattie, Matty, Maud, Maude, Maudie, Tilda, Tilli, Tillie, Tilly (English)
- Matilda (Finnish)
- Martilda, Marty, Tilda, Thilda (Nigerian language)
- Mathilde, Martilde, Mahault, Mahaud, Mahaut, Maheut (French)
- Mathilde, Mechthild, Mechthildis, Mechtild, Mechtilde, Hilde, Tilde (German)
- Matthilde (Ματθίλδη) (Greek)
- Matilda (מטילדה) (Hebrew)
- Matild (Hungarian)
- Matthildur (Icelandic)
- Maitilde (Irish)
- Mafalda, Martelda, Matélda, Matilde (Italian)
- Machiruda (マチルダ) (Japanese)
- Matilda, Mathilda, Mathildis (Latin)
- Mǣþhild (Old English)
- Matylda (Polish)
- Matilde (Portuguese)
- Matilda (Romanian)
- Matilda (Матильда) (Russian)
- Matilde, Matilda, Marthilda (Spanish)

== People ==
=== Mathilda ===
- Mathilda Berwald (1798–1877), Swedish royal court singer
- Mathilda Cajdos (1877–1909), Hungarian-American circus performer with the stage name Princess Nouma-Hawa
- Mathilda d'Orozco (1796–1863), Italian composer
- Mathilda Enequist (1833–1898), Swedish opera singer
- Mathilda Foy (1813–1869), Swedish philanthropist
- Mathilda Gelhaar (1813–1889), Swedish opera singer
- Mathilda Högberg (born 1994), Swedish social media influencer
- Mathilda Linsén (1831–1872), Finnish educator
- Mathilda May (born 1965), French film actress
- Mathilda Rotkirch (1813–1842), Finnish painter

=== Matilda ===
- Matilda Greathouse Alexander (1842–1892), Indiana writer
- Matilda Algotsson (born 1998), Swedish figure skater
- Matilda Allison (1888–1973), American educator
- Matilda Aku Alomatu (born 1970), Ghanaian diplomat
- Matilda of Amboise (c. 1200 – 1256), French nobility
- Matilda Amissah-Arthur, Second Lady of Ghana from 2012 to 2017
- Matilda of Andechs (died 1245), German nobility
- Matilda De Angelis (born 1995), Italian actress and singer
- Matilda of Anjou, Duchess of Normandy in 1120
- Matilda of Brabant, Countess of Artois (1224–1288), Flemish noblewoman
- Matilda Aslizadeh, Canadian artist
- Matilda Baffour Awuah, Ghanaian female security expert
- Matilda Chaplin Ayrton (1846–1883), English physician
- Matilda de Bailleul (c. 1132 – 1212), Flemish abbess
- Matilda M. Barratt (1837–1902), American Mormon member
- Matilda Black Bear (1947–2014), Lakota Sioux activist
- Matilda Bedingfeld (1828–1905), British amateur artist
- Matilda Betham-Edwards (1836–1919), English writer, poet and children's writer
- Matilda of Béthune (died 1264), Countess consort of Flanders
- Matilda Bickers, American artist, writer and sex worker rights activist
- Matilda Ashurst Biggs (1818–1866), English women's rights activist
- Matilda Ellen Bishop (1842–1913), British academic principal
- Matilda Bogdanoff (born 1990), Finnish hurdler
- Matilda Booker (1887–1957), African-American educator in Virginia
- Matilda Boson (born 1981), Swedish handball player
- Matilda of Boulogne, Queen of England from 1135 to 1152
- Matilda of Boulogne, Duchess of Brabant (1170–1210), French noblewoman
- Matilda de Braose (Deheubarth) (fl. 1240s), Welsh noblewoman
- Matilda FitzRoy, Duchess of Brittany (fl. 12th century), Illegitimate daughter of Henry I of England
- Matilda Moldenhauer Brooks (1888–1981), American cell biologist
- Matilda Brown (born 1987), Australian actress
- Matilda Browne (1869–1947), American painter
- Matilda Auchincloss Brownell (1869–1966), American Impressionist painter and portraitist
- Matilda Bruckner, American scholar of medieval French literature
- Matilda of Brunswick-Lüneburg (1276–1318), German noblewoman
- Matilda of Brandenburg, Duchess of Brunswick-Lüneburg (c. 1210–1261), German duchess
- Matilda of Carinthia, 12th-century Countess of Champagne
- Matilda Gilruth Carpenter (1831–1923), American activist
- Matilda Carse (1835–1917), Irish-born American businesswoman, social reformer, publisher
- Matilda Castren (born 1995), Finnish professional golfer
- Matilda J. Clerk (1916–1984), Ghanaian physician and science educator
- Matilda Cole, English musician and actress
- Matilda Maranda Crawford (1844–1920), American poet
- Matilda Cugler-Poni (1851–1931), Romanian poet
- Matilda Cuomo (born 1931), Former First Lady of New York State
- Matilda D'Oyly (fl. 1147), Saxon noblewoman
- Matilda of Dammartin, Queen of Portugal from 1248 to 1253
- Matilda of Dendermonde (died 1224), Flemish noblewoman
- Matilda Djerf (born 1997), Swedish influencer and entrepreneur
- Matilda Draper (born 2000), English television personality
- Matilda T. Durham (1815–1901), American composer and hymn writer
- Matilda Ridout Edgar (1844–1910), Canadian historian
- Matilda Ekholm (born 1982), Swedish table tennis player
- Matilda Ernkrans (born 1973), Swedish politician
- Matilda Etches (1898–1974), British fashion and costume designer
- Matilda Evans (1866–1935), African-American physician
- Matilda Jane Evans (1827–1886), Australian novelist
- Matilda of Flanders (c. 1031–1083), wife of William the Conqueror
- Matilda of France (943–981/982), member of the Carolingian dynasty
- Matilda of Franconia (c. 1027 – 1034), daughter of Emperor Conrad II
- Matilda of Frisia (died 1044), wife of Henry I, King of the Franks
- Matilda of Holstein (1220 or 1225–1288), Danish queen consort
- Matilda of Habsburg (1253–1304), Duchess consort of Bavaria
- Matilda of Požega (c. 1210 – after 1255), daughter of Margaret de Courtenay, wife of John Angelos of Syrmia
- Matilda, Countess of Rethel (1091–1151), French noblewoman
- Matilda of Ringelheim (c. 894–968), or Saint Matilda, a Saxon noblewoman
- Matilda of Savoy, Queen of Portugal (1125–1158), first Portuguese queen-consort
- Matilda of Savoy (1390–1498), Electress Palatine
- Matilda of Scotland (c. 1080–1118), birth name Edith, wife of Henry I of England
- Matilda of Tuscany (1046–1114), Countess of Tuscany (also called Mathilde or Matilde of Canossa)
- Matilda Carse (1835–1917), Irish-born American businesswoman, social reformer, publisher
- Matilda Maranda Crawford (1844–1920), American-Canadian newspaper correspondent, writer, poet
- Matilda Draper (born 2000}, English television personality
- Matilda Caragiu Marioțeanu (1927–2009), Romanian linguist
- Matilda McNamara (born 1998), Australian footballer
- Matilda Newport, Liberian folk hero
- Matilda Coxe Stevenson (1855–1915, née Evans), American ethnologist and author
- Matilda Cugler-Poni (1851–1931), Romanian poet
- Matilda Etches (1898–1974), British fashion designer
- Matilda Ehringhaus (1890–1980), First Lady of North Carolina
- Matilda Firth (born 2014), English actress
- Matilda Freeman (born 2004), British actress
- Matilda Joslyn Gage (1826–1898), American feminist and freethinker
- Matilda Rose Ledger (born 2005), daughter of actor Heath Ledger and actress Michelle Williams
- Matilda Lowther (b. 1995), British fashion model
- Matilda Penne (died 1393), English businessperson of the fourteenth century
- Matilda Simon, 3rd Baroness Simon of Wythenshawe (born 1955), British transgender peer
- Matilda Wirtavuori (born 2000), Finnish beauty pageant winner

=== Tilda ===
- Tilda Cobham-Hervey (born 1994), Australian actress
- Tilda Lindstam (born 1993), Swedish model
- Tilda Löthman-Koponen (1874–1962), Finnish schoolteacher and politician
- Tilda Norberg (born 1941), American minister, therapist and author
- Tilda Swinton (born 1960), Scottish actress
- Tilda Thamar (1921–1989), Argentine actress

== Fictional characters ==
- Matilda Wormwood, in Roald Dahl's novel Matilda
- Matilda McDuck, a Disney character
- Matilda Hunter, in the Australian soap opera Home and Away
- Matilda Ajan, in Mobile Suit Gundam
- Matilda Ashby, character on the America soap opera The Young and the Restless

== See also ==
- Matilda (disambiguation)
