= Matilda of Vianden =

Matilda of Vianden (also spelled Mathilda or Mathilde) may refer to:

- Matilda of Vianden (c. 1200), wife of Frederic III, Count of Vianden (de)
- Matilda of Vianden (de), daughter of Frederic III of Vianden; sister of Henry I, Count of Vianden
- Matilda of Požega (c. 1210-after 1255), step-daughter of count Henry I of Vianden (d. 1252); wife of John Angelos, lord of Syrmia

== See also ==
- Matilda (disambiguation)
- Counts of Vianden
- Matilda (given name)
