= Maudie =

Maudie is a diminutive form to the female given name Maud(e).

== People ==
- Maudie Bitar, Lebanese journalist and critic
- Maudie Dunham (1902–1982), British actress
- Maudie Edwards (1906–1991), Welsh actress, comedian and singer
- Maudie Hopkins (1914–2008), American Civil War widow
- Maudie Joan Littlewood (1914–2002), English theatre director
- Maudie Prickett (1914–1976), American actress

== Other uses ==
- Maudie (film), a 2016 English-language biographical film about artist Maud Lewis
- Maudie Mason, principal character of the "Maudie stories" of the 1930s and '40s
- SS Maudie, a Norwegian tanker in service 1920–38
