= Maudy =

Maudy is an Indonesian given name. Notable people with the given name include:

- Maudy Ayunda (born 1994), Indonesian actress, singer-songwriter, entrepreneur and author
- Maudy Effrosina (born 1995), Indonesian actress and model
- Maudy Koesnaedi (born 1975), Indonesian actress and model

== See also ==
- Maud (given name), another given name
