= Edward Tindal Atkinson =

British barrister and judge

Atkinson in 1947.

Major Sir Edward Hale Tindal Atkinson, KCB, CBE (19 September 1878 – 26 December 1957) was a British barrister and judge who served as the Director of Public Prosecutions from 1930 to 1944. After studying at Trinity College, Oxford, Atkinson built up a substantial practice as a barrister. His volunteer work in the First World War subsequently forced him to stop practising at the bar. After the end of the war, for his work at the peace conference Atkinson was appointed Commander of the Order of the British Empire and Chevalier of the Légion d'honneur. Atkinson re-established his practice and was made Director of Public Prosecutions in March 1930. His period in office is generally seen as a success, and he was appointed a Knight Commander of the Order of the Bath in 1932. Following his retirement, Atkinson served as chairman of the Central Price Regulation Committee, dying on 26 December 1957.

== Life ==
Atkinson was born in Shortlands, Kent, one of five children of Henry Tindal Atkinson, a county court judge, and his wife, Marion Lewin. His sister, Maud Tindal Atkinson, became a noted artist and illustrator. After studying at Harrow School, Atkinson matriculated to Trinity College, Oxford, where he was known by his friends as "Tatters". After gaining a third in classics and a second in modern history in 1899 and 1901 respectively, he joined the Middle Temple, where he was called to the Bar in 1902. Atkinson built up a substantial practice on the South Eastern Circuit dealing with local government and taxation cases. In 1913, he was elected to the Bar Council, where he served until 1921. During the First World War, he was commissioned as a temporary lieutenant in the Royal Naval Volunteer Reserve on 12 November 1917, attached to the Royal Naval Air Service, but reporting to the Air Section of Naval Intelligence. This first appointment did not last long, transferring on 23 November to the secretariat of the Civil Aerial Transport Committee. He transferred to the nascent Royal Air Force in 1918 as a captain, and he was an acting major from 19 April 1918 to 31 May 1919. He ceased to be actively employed with the RAF on 17 June 1919. At the end of the war, he acted as a legal representative for Britain at the peace negotiations and was appointed Commander of the Order of the British Empire (Civil Division) and Chevalier of the Légion d'honneur in 1920 as a reward.

After returning to Britain, he re-established his practice, serving as an additional member of the Bar Council between 1928 and 1930, becoming a Bencher of the Middle Temple in 1929 and being appointed the Recorder of Southend-on-Sea on 10 September. In March 1930, he was made Director of Public Prosecutions—when called to the Home Office to be told this, he refused to believe it and left the room before he was brought back. Atkinson knew none of the staff, was not a criminal lawyer, and spent the first two years scared that he was doing something wrong. His fears lessened over time, particularly after he was appointed a Knight Commander of the Order of the Bath in the 1932 Birthday Honours. At the start of the Second World War he helped prepare the defence regulations, and was directly involved in all the spying cases.

Atkinson retired in 1944 and became chairman of the Central Price Regulation Committee, where he remained until its dissolution in April 1953. In 1948, he became Treasurer of Middle Temple and, along with two other Treasurers from the post-war period, has his initials carved into the stonework as a testament to the rebuilding that went on during his period as Treasurer. Following an accident at his home, he died on 26 December 1957.

Preceded by Sir Archibald Bodkin	Director of Public Prosecutions; 1930–1944	Succeeded by Sir Theobald Mathew
