= Maude =

Maude may refer to:

== Places ==
- Cape Maude, a high ice-covered cape forming the east end of Vaughan promontory in Antarctica
- Mount Maude, a peak in Washington state, US

=== Australia ===
- Maude, New South Wales, a village on the lower Murrumbidgee River
- Maude, South Australia, a locality
- Maude, Victoria, a rural township

== Other uses ==
- Maude (name), a female given name (including a list of people with the name)
- Maude (TV series), a 1972–1978 CBS television situation comedy
- Maude (restaurant), a defunct Michelin-starred restaurant by Curtis Stone in Beverly Hills, California
- Maude system, implementing reflective logic and rewriting logic

== See also ==
- Harold and Maude, a 1971 romantic black comedy–drama film
- Matilda (disambiguation)
- Maud (disambiguation)
