= Matilda (ship) =

Several vessels have borne the name Matilda:

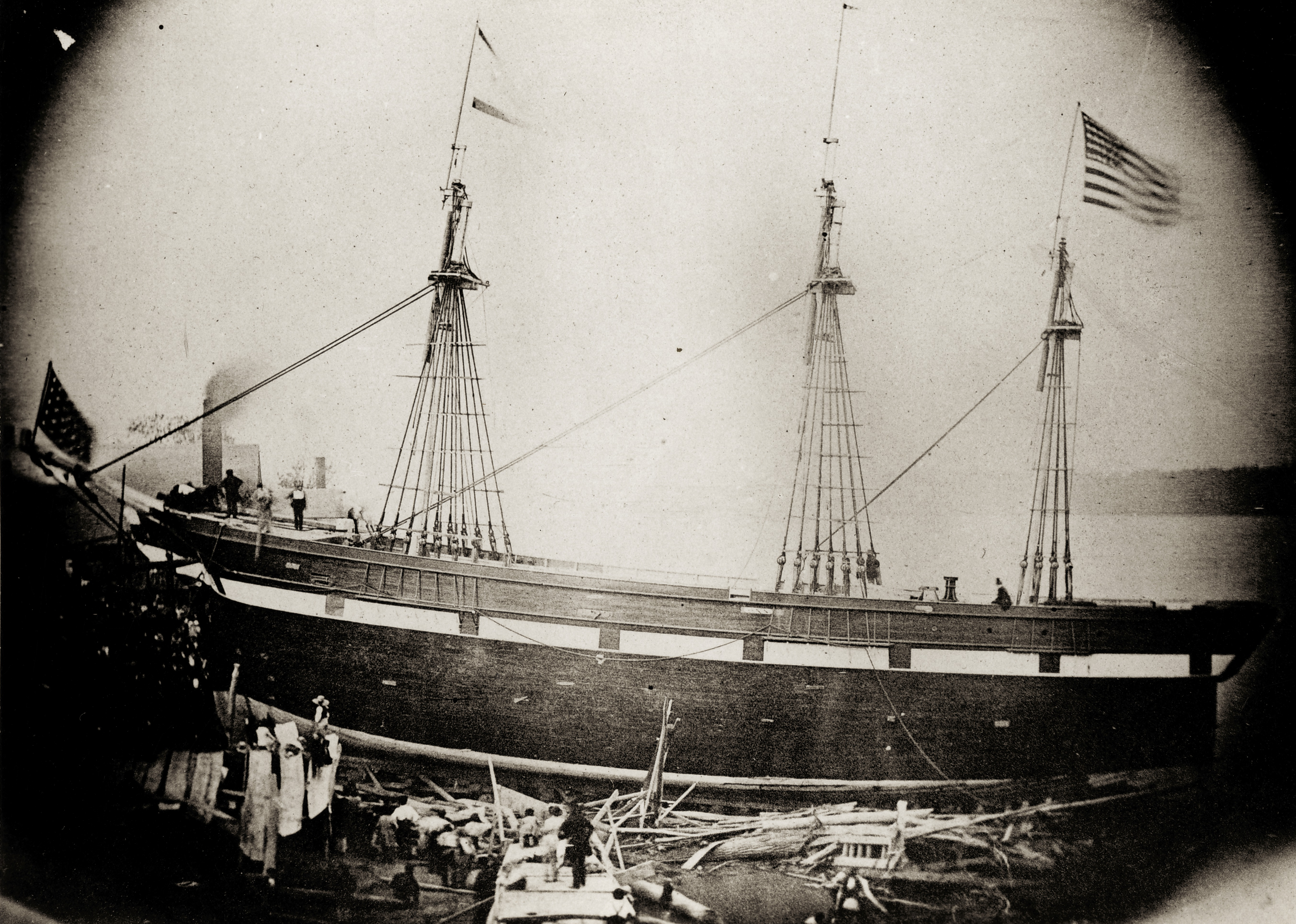
Sailing ship Matilda, 1849

- Matilda (1790 ship) was a ship built in France and launched in 1779. She first appears in British records in 1790 as a whaling ship and transported convicts to Australia in 1791; she wrecked in 1792.
- Matilda (1803 ship) was launched at Calcutta in 1803. She spent most of her career in private trade in India or in trading between England and India. She participated in the British invasion of Java (1811) and made one voyage for the British East India Company (EIC). She grounded and was wrecked in March 1822.
- Matilda (1812 ship) was an American privateer schooner out of Philadelphia that the British letter of marque Lion captured in July 1813, that the American privateer Argus recaptured, that HMS Revolutionnaire recaptured, and that the American privateer General Armstrong again recaptured
- HMS Esk was a Cyrus-class ship-sloop launched at Ipswich in 1813. During the War of 1812 she captured one United States privateer, and fought an inconclusive action with another. Between 1825 and 1827 Esk was part of the West Africa Squadron, engaged in suppressing the trans-Atlantic slave trade, during which period she captured a number of slave ships. A prize she had taken also engaged in a notable single ship action. The Royal Navy sold Esk in 1829. Green, Wigram, and Green purchased her and between 1829 and 1845 she made four voyages in the British southern whale fishery as the whaler Matilda.

== See also ==
- HMS Matilda, two vessels of the Royal Navy
