= Minister for the Co-ordination of Defensive Measures =

Former Irish government cabinet minister

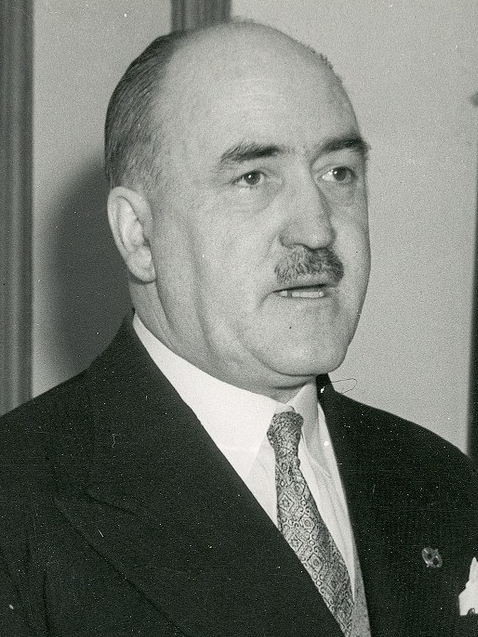
- Minister without portfolio
- Member of: Cabinet; Oireachtas
- Reports to: Taoiseach
- Nominator: Taoiseach
- Appointer: President of Ireland on the nomination of the Taoiseach
- Formation: 8 September 1939
- First holder: Frank Aiken
- Final holder: Frank Aiken
- Abolished: 16 August 1945

The Minister for the Co-ordination of Defensive Measures was the title of Frank Aiken as a member of the Government of Ireland from 8 September 1939 to 18 June 1945 during The Emergency — the state of emergency in operation in Ireland during World War II. The Minister was intended to handle Civil Defence and related measures, allowing the Minister for Defence to concentrate on matters relating to the regular Army. The office was also responsible for handling wartime censorship.

Aiken was a minister without portfolio, as there was no Department of State corresponding to his brief, although there was an Office of the Minister for the Co-ordination of Defensive Measures. The Ministers and Secretaries (Amendment) Act 1939, which allows for ministers without portfolio, also allows such a minister to have a specific style or title. In fact, Aiken had been appointed on 8 September 1939, and the Act was passed on 21 December 1939, backdated to 8 September. The Minister for Supplies, who did have a corresponding Department of State, was established on the same dates. The section in the Act on ministers without portfolio was seen by Richard Mulcahy as designed to safeguard the legality of Aiken's office.

Taoiseach Éamon de Valera explained the reasoning behind the ministry:

We have then the problem of defence, and to meet these problems of various kinds we thought it advisable to set up a Ministry for the co-ordination of various defensive measures. There was a special reason for that, because with the increase in the size of the Army it was desirable that the Minister for Defence should be in as close touch as possible with the Army and its condition. Questions were asked the Minister for Defence to-day which were right questions to be asked with regard to the conditions of the men called up, and so on. It was right that everyone should be interested in these conditions, and that there should be one person responsible for looking after those conditions, but he cannot do it if he is distracted by a number of other things. Therefore, it was decided that the Minister for Defence, at a time like this, should be free from other duties which might fall upon him, with a view to devoting his attention more closely to the Army and to its immediate requirements. To give us a Minister free to do that and, at the same time, to have someone charged with the general co-ordination of defensive measures, we asked the former Minister for Defence, as we asked the Minister for Industry and Commerce, to leave his immediate Department and take on wider spheres of activity. It is clear that the man who has been doing particular work for a period is the desirable person to put in charge.

The Minister received functions delegated by other ministers, as provided for by section 6 of the Emergency Powers Act 1939. Aiken enforced stringent censorship of news, and of material potentially sympathetic to the Allies, in accordance with Ireland's neutrality. He was also responsible for air raid precautions, delegated by the Minister for Defence. Seán Moylan, Parliamentary Secretary to the Minister for Defence, served also as Parliamentary Secretary to the Minister for the Co-ordination of Defensive Measures.

In April 1941, Aiken went to the United States to ask President Franklin D. Roosevelt for military aid. Roosevelt told Aiken that Ireland should be supporting Britain, prompting Aiken to ask Roosevelt to seek guarantees from the British Government that the UK would not invade Ireland.

In 1943, Labour Party TDs William Davin and Timothy J. Murphy questioned the need for such a minister, and the vagueness of its responsibilities.

The ministry was abolished on 18 June 1945. The following day, Aiken was appointed Minister for Finance.
