= Mathilde =

Mathilde is an alternative spelling of the names Matilde or Matilda, and could refer to:

- Mathilde Dolgopol de Sáez (1901 –1957), Argentinian vertebrate paleontologist
- Mathilde, Abbess of Essen (949–1011)
- Mathilde Alanic (1864-1948), French novelist, short story writer
- Mathilde Marianne Bielschowsky (1904–1977), German biochemist
- Mathilde Bonaparte (1820-1904), French princess and salonnière
- Mathilde Hjort Bressum (born 1998), Danish politician
- Matilde Camus (1919–2012), Spanish poet
- Mathilde Esch (1815–1904), Austrian genre painter
- Mathilde Feld (born 1969), French politician
- Mathilde Harviken (born 2001), Norwegian footballer
- Mathilde Hupin (born 1984), Canadian orthopaedic surgeon and cyclist
- Mathilde Kschessinska (1872–1971), ballet dancer
- Mathilde Wildauer (1820–1878), actress and opera singer
- Queen Mathilde of Belgium (born 1973)
- Mathilde Sallier de La Tour (1838–1911), French‑Italian painter and author
- Mathilde Wolff Van Sandau (1843–1926), British suffragette
- Jeanne-Mathilde Herbelin (1818–1904), French portrait miniaturist
- 253 Mathilde, an asteroid
- Mathilde (film), a 2004 film
- "Mathilde" (song), by Jacques Brel, 1964
- Matilde di Shabran, an opera by Gioachino Rossini
- Schipper naast Mathilde, a 1950s Flemish TV series
