= Frank Aiken =

Irish revolutionary and politician (1898–1983)

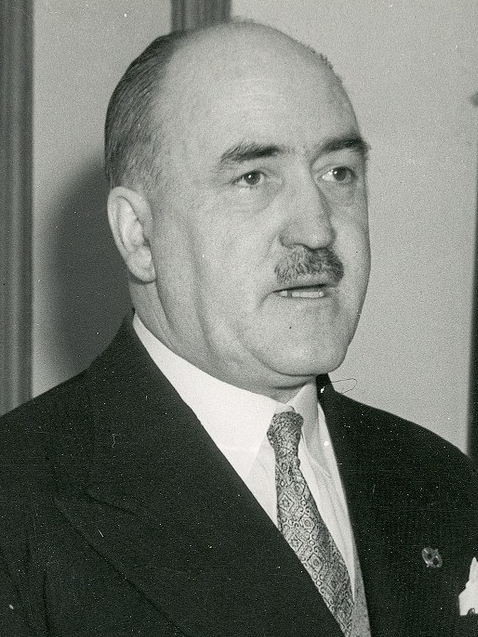
- Aiken in 1944

Tánaiste
- In office 21 April 1965 – 2 July 1969
- Taoiseach: Seán Lemass; Jack Lynch
- Preceded by: Seán MacEntee
- Succeeded by: Erskine H. Childers

Minister for External Affairs
- In office 20 March 1957 – 2 July 1969
- Taoiseach: Éamon de Valera; Seán Lemass; Jack Lynch
- Preceded by: Liam Cosgrave
- Succeeded by: Patrick Hillery
- In office 13 June 1951 – 2 June 1954
- Taoiseach: Éamon de Valera
- Preceded by: Seán MacBride
- Succeeded by: Liam Cosgrave

Minister for Finance
- In office 19 June 1945 – 18 February 1948
- Taoiseach: Éamon de Valera
- Preceded by: Seán T. O'Kelly
- Succeeded by: Patrick McGilligan

Minister for the Co-ordination of Defensive Measures
- In office 8 September 1939 – 18 June 1945
- Taoiseach: Éamon de Valera
- Preceded by: New office
- Succeeded by: Office abolished

Minister for Defence
- In office 9 March 1932 – 8 September 1939
- Taoiseach: Éamon de Valera
- Preceded by: Desmond FitzGerald
- Succeeded by: Oscar Traynor

Minister for Lands and Fisheries
- In office 3 June 1936 – 11 November 1936
- Taoiseach: Éamon de Valera
- Preceded by: Joseph Connolly
- Succeeded by: Gerald Boland

Teachta Dála
- In office August 1923 – February 1973
- Constituency: Louth

Personal details
- Born: Francis Thomas Aiken; 13 February 1898 Camlough, County Armagh, Ireland
- Died: 18 May 1983 (aged 85) Blackrock, Dublin, Ireland
- Resting place: St Malachy's Church, Camlough, County Armagh, Northern Ireland
- Party: Fianna Fáil (from 1926)
- Other political affiliations: Sinn Féin (1923–1926)
- Spouse: Maud Aiken (m. 1934; died 1978)
- Children: 3
- Education: University College Dublin
- Military career
- Allegiance: Irish Republic
- Branch: Irish Volunteers; Irish Republican Army; Anti-Treaty IRA
- Service years: 1913–1925
- Rank: Divisional Commandant
- Commands: OC, 4th Northern Division, IRA; Chief of Staff, IRA
- Conflicts: Irish War of Independence; Irish Civil War

Francis Thomas Aiken (13 February 1898 – 18 May 1983) was an Irish revolutionary and politician. He was chief of staff of the Anti-Treaty IRA at the end of the Irish Civil War. Aiken later served as Tánaiste from 1965 to 1969 and Minister for External Affairs from 1951 to 1954 and 1957 to 1969. He was also Minister for Finance from 1945 to 1948, Minister for the Co-ordination of Defensive Measures 1939 to 1945, and Minister for Defence from 1932 to 1939.

He was a Teachta Dála (TD) for the Louth constituency from 1923 to 1973, making him the second longest-serving member of Dáil Éireann and the longest-serving cabinet minister. Originally a member of Sinn Féin, he was later a founding member of Fianna Fáil.

== Early life ==
Frank Aiken was born on 13 February 1898 at Carrickbracken, Camlough, County Armagh, Ireland, the seventh and youngest child of James Aiken, a builder from County Tyrone, and Mary McGeeney of Corromannon, Beleek, County Armagh. James Aiken built Catholic churches in South Armagh. Aiken was a nationalist, a member of the Irish Republican Brotherhood and a county councillor, who refused an offer to stand as a member of parliament. James was Chairman of the Local Board of the Poor Guardians. In 1900, on her visit to Ireland, he told Queen Victoria that he would not welcome her "until Ireland has become free".

Frank Aiken was educated at the Camlough National School and in Newry by the Irish Christian Brothers at Abbey Christian Brothers Grammar School, although he had only a 'vague' recollection of school.

== Revolutionary period ==
=== Irish Volunteers and IRA ===
He was elected a lieutenant in 1914 when he joined the Camlough Company of Irish Volunteers and the Gaelic League. But the northern nationalists split so they took no part in the Easter Rising. He became secretary of the local branch in 1917 and joined Sinn Féin. His sister Nano Aiken organised Cumann na mBan in Newry, setting up a local branch at Camlough. While working at the Co-Operative Flax-Scutching Society, Aiken committed to speaking Irish, which he learned at the Donegal Gaeltacht and Omeath Irish College. His sister, Nano, married Phelim Magennis a Newry stockbroker, and was the last female republican prisoner to be released in Northern Ireland at the end of the Civil War. Magennis, himself was active during these years.

He first met Éamon de Valera at the East Clare election in June 1917, riding despatches for Austin Stack. During a rowdy by-election at Bessbrook in February 1918, Aiken was elected a captain of Volunteers, stewarding electioneering. As secretary and chairman of the South Armagh district executive (comhairle ceanntair) it was his job to be chief fund-raiser for the Dublin Executive, responsible for the Dáil loan masterminded by Michael Collins.

In 1917, making an outward display of defiance, Aiken raised the republican Irish tricolour, opposite Camlough Barracks in Armagh, a move designed as deliberate provocation.

In March 1918 he was arrested by the RIC for illegal drilling — an act of open defiance that provoked a sentence of imprisonment for one month. On release that summer he joined the secretive Irish Republican Brotherhood fighting Hibernianism in the area. By 1919 Aiken's clandestine activities mainly consisted of arms raids on dumps of the Ulster Volunteers who had imported weapons to resist Home Rule in 1913–14. As well as UVF dumps, Aiken and the Newry Brigade also raided prominent local unionist barracks at Dromilly, Ballyedmond Castle and Loughall Manor. Although they failed to capture many weapons the raids gave experience to newly recruited Volunteers. Aiken was also responsible for setting up GAA Club, Gaelic League branch, a Cumann na mBan Camogie League. Within a few years he was Chairman of Sinn Féin in Armagh, and was also elected to Armagh County Council. During the First Dáil Election he headed a team from South Armagh who went to Carlingford to assist the Sinn Fein candidacy of J.J. Kelly in Louth where they were attacked by members of the local Ancient Order of Hibernians.

=== War of Independence ===
Operating from the south Armagh/north Louth area, Aiken's unit was one of the most effective IRA in Ulster during the Irish War of Independence. This success is attributed primarily to Aiken's leadership and training methods.

In May 1920, he led 200 IRA men in an assault on the RIC barracks in Newtownhamilton, attacking the building and then burning it with paraffin sprayed from a potato sprayer; however, the garrison did not surrender. Aiken himself led a squad which blasted a hole in the wall of the barracks with gelignite and entered through it, exchanging shots with the policemen inside.

At a sports event in Cullyhanna in June 1920, Aiken led a group of three men that demanded that three RIC men hand over their weapons. Shooting broke out and one man on each side was killed.

In July, he was almost killed at Banbridge. While riding a motorcycle to Lurgan he was chased by an angry mob.

In December 1920, he led another assault, this time abortive, on the RIC station in his home village of Camlough. In reprisal, the newly formed Ulster Special Constabulary burned Aiken's home and those of ten of his relatives in the Camlough area. They also arrested and killed two local republicans. From this point onward, the conflict in the area took on an increasingly bitter and sectarian quality. Aiken tried on a number of occasions to ambush USC patrols from the ruins of his family home.

He was quickly promoted through the ranks, rising to brigade commandant of Newry Brigade and, after an IRA reorganisation in April 1921, divisional commandant of the 4th Northern Division of the IRA. The IRA units he would eventually command extended from County Louth, southern and western County Down, and from March 1921 the whole of County Armagh.

In April 1921, Aiken's men mounted an operation in Creggan, County Armagh to ambush the police and Special Constabulary. One Special constable was killed in the ensuing firefight. Some accounts have reported that Aiken took the Protestant Church congregation in the village hostage to lure the Specials out onto the road. However, Mathew Lewis states that both Catholic and Protestant churchgoers were held in a pub to prevent their getting caught in the crossfire. Nevertheless, sectarian bitterness deepened in the area. The following month, the Special Constabulary started shooting Catholic civilians in revenge for IRA attacks.

On 24 June 1921, Aiken organised his most successful attack yet on the British military, when his men derailed a British troop train returning to Dublin from the opening of the Northern Parliament, killing the train guard, three cavalry soldiers and 63 horses. Shortly afterwards, the Specials took four Catholics from their homes in Bessbrook and Altnaveigh, shooting them dead.

The cycle of violence in south-east Ulster area continued the following year, despite a formal truce with the British from 11 July 1921 (see The Troubles in Ulster (1920–1922)). Michael Collins organised a clandestine guerrilla offensive (Northern Offensive) against the newly created Northern Ireland State. In May 1922, for reasons that have never been properly determined, Aiken and his 4th Northern Division never took part in the operation, although it was planned that they would.

Nonetheless, the local IRA's inaction at this time did not end the bloodshed in South Armagh. Aiken has been accused by unionists of ethnic cleansing of Protestants from parts of South Armagh, Newry and other areas of the north. In particular, Aiken's critics cite the killing of six Protestant civilians, on an incident called the Altnaveigh Massacre, on 17 June 1922. The attack was in reprisal for the Special Constabulary's killing of two nationalists near Camlough on 13 June and a sexual assault on Una McGuill, the wife of one of Aiken's friends, James McGuill. As well as the six civilians, two Special Constables were killed in an ambush, and two weeks later a unionist politician, William Frazer, was abducted, killed and his body secretly buried. It was not found until 1924. Aiken himself led an ambush against some of those who partook in the assault on McGuill's public house on the night of the Altnaveigh ambush. However, it appears that the Specials were alerted to their arrival and this attack did not end in success as the patrol escaped unharmed. At the same time the attack on Altnaveigh and Lisdrumniska was carried out. Robert Lynch, in published research, has documented the deaths of several single Catholic youths whose bodies were dumped on roads approaching these areas on the weeks prior to this assault killings that were attributed to B-Specials who operated from the area. Aiken was quoted on his Divisions retaliatory attacks: "They never hit a nationalist but we hit back twice as hard. We had them cowed in our area." Aiken claimed that at least 60 Specials were killed by his 4th Northern Division in the period from Christmas to June 1922.

=== Civil War ===
In early 1922, Aiken was named by Eoin O'Duffy, then IRA Chief of Staff, as head of the newly formed IRA Ulster Council which was tasked with coordination of attacks and preventing the new northern government from functioning effectively.

After the IRA split over the Anglo-Irish Treaty in 1922, Aiken ultimately became aligned with the anti-Treaty side in spite of personal efforts to prevent division and civil war and by remaining neutral at first. After fighting broke out between pro- and anti-Treaty units in Dublin on 28 June 1922, he wrote to Richard Mulcahy on 6 July 1922 calling for a truce, the election of a new reunited IRA army council and the removal of the Oath of Allegiance from the Free State constitution. Mulcahy was evasive, however, and said he 'could not see a way to advise the government' to agree with Aiken's proposals. Subsequently, Aiken travelled to Limerick to meet with anti-Treaty IRA leader Liam Lynch, and urged him to consider a truce in return for the removal of references to the British monarch from the constitution. At this time Limerick was occupied by three Armies, Pro-Treaty, Anti-Treaty and British Troops. Aiken was attempting throughout to avoid Civil War from breaking out and urging that all military remain together to push north to re-take the Six-Counties of Northern Ireland, territory which made up his homeland and counties of his own Army Division. Aiken later felt that without the sterling work done in support of the Treaty by Eoin O'Duffy, aided by Mulcahy and Eoin MacNeill, civil war would have been avoided.

Despite his neutrality and pleas for a negotiated end to the Civil War, Aiken was arrested by pro-Treaty troops on 16 July 1922, under Dan Hogan, on the orders of Mulcahy and Collins, and imprisoned at Dundalk Gaol along with about 200 to 300 of his men. After just ten days imprisonment, he was freed in a mass escape of 100 men from Dundalk prison on 28 July. Then, on 14 August, he led a surprise attack of between 300 and 400 anti-treaty IRA men on Dundalk. They blew holes in the army barracks there and rapidly took control of the town at a cost of just two of his men killed. The operation freed 240 republican prisoners seizing 400 rifles. While in possession of the town, Aiken publicly called for an end to the Civil War. However, knowing he could not hope to retain Dundalk militarily he retreated north of the town. In Man of No Property Todd Andrews who accompanied him on the assault stated that: "Had it been carried out against a British garrison under arms it would have been the most successful amphibious assault carried out ever by an IRA Commander." While celebrated in the Anti-Treaty IRA publications it was clear Aiken was not interested in an offensive campaign just taking back what had been his before. For the remainder of the conflict he remained at large with his unit, carrying out no major attacks on Free State forces. Aiken was to remain unenthusiastic about the internecine struggle.

His son Frank Jr. recalls "I did ask him about the Civil War a little bit, but he wouldn't answer. He'd give me an answer like terrible things happen in wars and worse in civil wars."

=== Chief of Staff ===
Aiken was with IRA leader Liam Lynch's patrol when they were ambushed at Knockmealdown on 10 April 1923. Lynch was shot and killed. Aiken rescued crucial IRA papers, "saved and brought through at any cost". He succeeded Lynch as IRA Chief of Staff on 20 April. Always ambivalent about the war against the Free State, Aiken soon issued a letter ordering a suspension of offensive operations from 30 April.

Department of the Chief of Staff, General Headquarters, Dublin, April 27th, 1923.

Special Army Orders. To OCs, Commanders and Independent Brigades.

Suspension of Offensive

1. I order to give effect to the decision of the government and Army Council embodied in attached Proclamation of this date. You will arrange the suspension of all offensive operations in your area as from now, Monday April 30th.

2. You will ensure that while remaining on the offensive all units take adequate measures to protect themselves and their munitions.

Chief of Staff.

Aiken had remained close to Éamon de Valera, who had long wanted to end the Civil War, and together the two came up with a compromise that would save the anti-Treaty side from a formal surrender. Instead of giving up their weapons, their fighters would receive a further order to 'dump arms' and simply return home as honourable republicans. Aiken wrote: "We took up arms to free our country and we'll keep them until we see an honourable way of reaching our objective without arms".

The ceasefire and dump-arms order, issued on 24 May 1923, effectively ended the Irish Civil War, though the Free State government did not issue a general amnesty until the following year. Aiken remained IRA Chief of Staff until 12 November 1925. That summer the IRA sent a delegation led by Pa Murray to the Soviet Union for a personal meeting with Joseph Stalin, in the hope of gaining Soviet finance and weaponry assistance. A secret pact was agreed whereby the IRA would spy on the United States and the United Kingdom, and pass information to Red Army military intelligence in New York City and London in return for £500 a month. The pact was originally approved by Aiken, who left his position as chief of staff soon after. He was succeeded by Andrew Cooney and Moss Twomey, who kept up the secret espionage relationship.

== Founder of Fianna Fáil ==
Aiken was first elected to Dáil Éireann as a Sinn Féin candidate for Louth in 1923. Aiken was at the April 1925 Commemoration ceremony at Dundalk, but by March 1926—when de Valera founded a new party, Fianna Fáil—he was in America. In June 1927 he was re-elected for Louth for Fianna Fáil, continuing to be re-elected for that party at every election until his retirement from politics in 1973. In May 1926 he bought Dun Gaoithe, a dairy farm, at Sandyford, County Dublin. Aiken was an innovator, an amateur inventor who took out patents throughout his life for a turf stove, a beehive, an air shelter, an electric cooker and a spring heel for a shoe among others and also powered the family home in Sandyford through use of a wind turbine.

He entered the first Fianna Fáil government in 1932 as Minister for Defence.

=== Clash with the Governor General ===
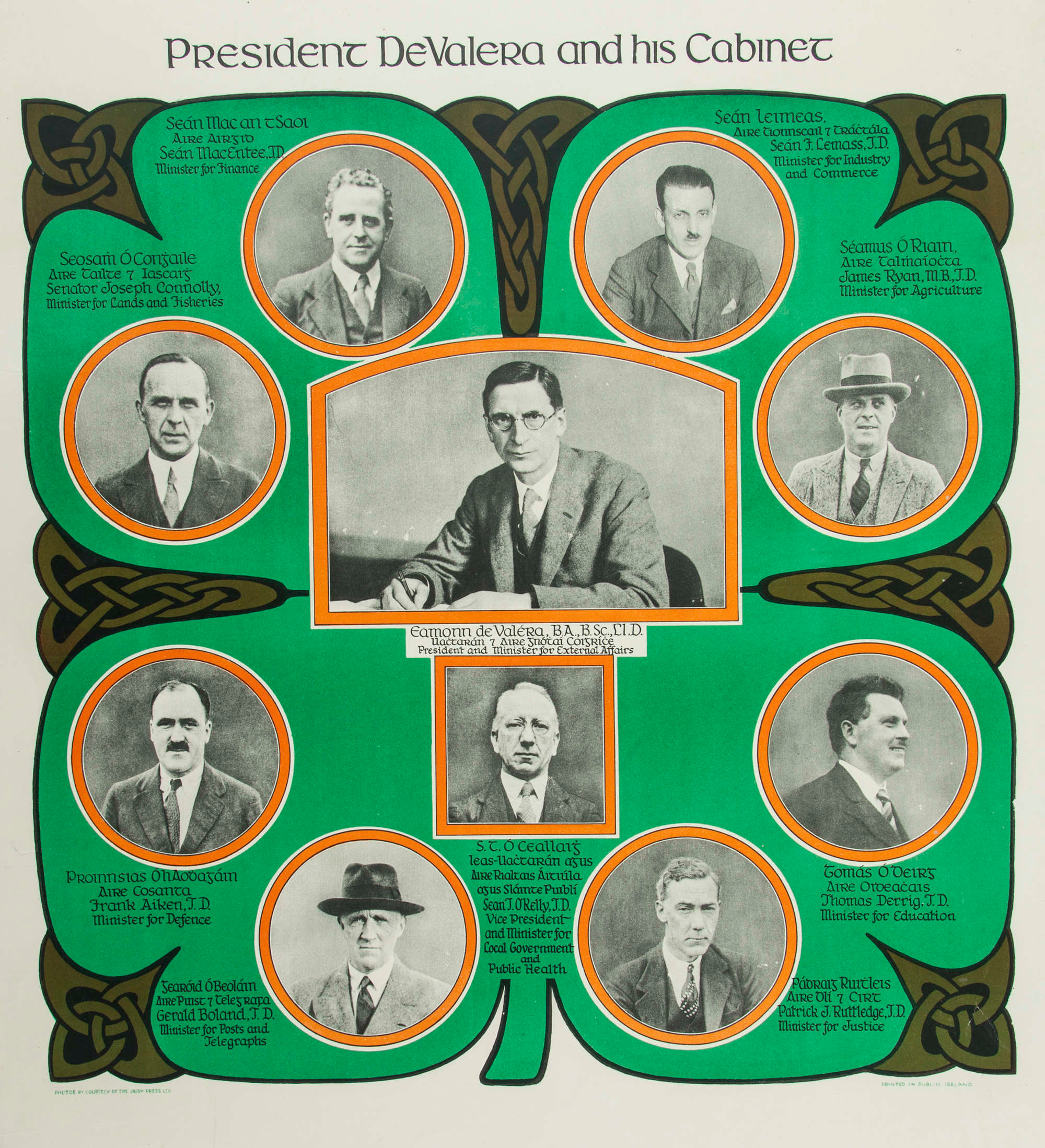
A poster displaying the members of De Valera's 1932 government cabinet, in which Aiken served as Minister for Defence

On de Valera's urging, Vice-President of the Executive Council Seán T. O'Kelly and Aiken publicly snubbed the Governor-General of the Irish Free State, James McNeill, by staging a public walkout at a function in the French legation in Dublin. When McNeill took offence at de Valera's response and, against government advice, published his correspondence, de Valera advised King George V to dismiss the Governor General. The King arranged a special deal between both men, whereby McNeill would retire from his post a few weeks earlier than planned, with the resignation coinciding with the dates de Valera had suggested for the dismissal. While agreeing that the situation was "regrettable" de Valera, instead of chastising the ministers, suggested that the Governor-General inform the Executive Council of his social engagements to enable ministers to avoid ones he was attending. MacNeill was a brother of Eoin MacNeill and this was a campaign to encourage him to resign as Governor-General which he did. Having done so, de Valera appointed Domhnall Ua Buachalla, a Fianna Fáil founding member, to the office.

=== Minister for Defence ===
Aiken had in March 1932 been trying to reach a new rapprochement, and "reconciled the Army to the new regime". On 9 March he visited republican prisoners, including George Gilmore, in Arbour Hill prison; they were released the next day. This was the same day he had been appointed as Minister for Defence.

Aiken was given a vice-presidency, 'Agriculture', by James Ryan at the Ottawa Conference. He advised on the usage of cutting peat bogs in County Meath and visited the Curragh Camp in County Kildare to accelerate land distribution to poor tenantry. Land was released in the 'Midlands' for development. C.S. Andrews credits Aiken for the Turf Development Board in his second autobiography, Man of No Property. The Turf Development Board would later become Bord na Móna. According to Andrews, Lemass said to him "I want you to head this organisation to get Aiken off my back". Aiken remained interested in the development of Ireland's natural resources throughout his political life.

Aiken was not involved in the Anglo-Irish Trade Agreement negotiations which took place on 25 April 1938. According to some sources this was because of his associations with the IRA, while other sources suggest that he was tactically left at home by de Valera – as Aiken was perceived in the UK as a vexed Anglophobe who the Irish would have to convince of their support for the agreement in Dublin.

=== The Emergency ===
At the outbreak of Second World War, a period known in Ireland as The Emergency, Aiken was appointed as Minister for the Co-ordination of Defensive Measures by de Valera with Oscar Traynor assuming the role of Minister for Defence, in de Valera's first major cabinet reshuffle as the country was put on a wartime footing to defend Irish neutrality.

He gained notoriety in Dublin media circles for overseeing censorship: his clashes with R. M. Smyllie, editor of The Irish Times, ensured this censorious attitude was resented by many. Aiken not only corrected war coverage by The Irish Times, whose editorial line was largely pro-British, but also banned pro-allied war films and even forbade the reporting of parliamentarians' speeches that went against the government line of strict neutrality. Aiken justified these measures, citing the 'terrible and all prevailing force of modern warfare' and the importance therein of morale and propaganda. However, it was the former government minister, Joseph Connolly, and fellow Ulster founder member of Fianna Fáil, who was appointed to the office of censor.

Aiken remained opposed to a British role and partition in Ireland, and was therefore a strong supporter of de Valera's policy of Irish neutrality that denied Britain use of Irish ports during the Battle of the Atlantic. Aiken considered that Ireland had to stand ready to resist invasion by both Germany and Britain, and the Irish Army was expanded under Aiken's ministry. It increased to a strength of 41,000 regulars and 180,000 in auxiliary units – the Local Defence Force and Local Security Force – by 1941, although these formations were relatively poorly equipped.

Aiken wanted to incorporate the IRA into the Army and offered the former an amnesty in the spring of 1940, which the underground organisation turned down. Nevertheless, during wartime as the IRA cooperated with German intelligence and pressed for a German landing in Northern Ireland, the government, with Aiken's approval, interned several hundred of its members and executed six for the shooting of Irish police officers. Even so, Aiken remained somewhat sympathetic to them in private and visited their prisoners in Arbour Hill prison in Dublin. However, he did not appeal for clemency for those condemned to death.

Thinking that Britain would lose the war in 1940, he refused to back senior British civil servant Malcolm MacDonald's plan for the unification of Ireland in return for the Irish state joining the British effort. In diplomatic negotiations Aiken told him that a united Ireland, if it was conceded, would still stay neutral to safeguard its security and that further talks were 'a sheer waste of time'. Furthermore, the Irish people 'would not support their government taking them into the war without some actual provocation from Germany'. When asked on American radio about the offer of unity in return for entering the war, he replied, 'most certainly not. We want union and sovereignty, not union and slavery'.

In March 1941, Aiken was sent to America to secure US supplies, both military and economic, that DeValera claimed Britain was withholding owing to Irish neutrality. Aiken had a bad-tempered meeting with President Franklin D. Roosevelt in Washington DC. Roosevelt urged Aiken and Ireland to join the war on the allied side asking if it was true that he had said that 'Ireland had nothing to fear from a German victory'. Aiken denied saying this but cited the British 'supply squeeze' as an act of aggression and asked the US to help. Roosevelt agreed to send supplies, but only if Britain consented. At the close Aiken asked the President to 'support us in our stand against aggression'. 'German aggression, yes' Roosevelt replied, to which Aiken retorted 'British aggression too'. This infuriated Roosevelt, who shouted 'nonsense' and 'pulled the tablecloth [from under his lunch] sending cutlery flying around the room'. Ultimately, Aiken was not able to secure a promise of American arms, but was able to get a shipment of grain, two merchant ships and coal. Roosevelt also gave 'his personal guarantee' that Britain would not invade Ireland.

=== Minister for External Affairs ===
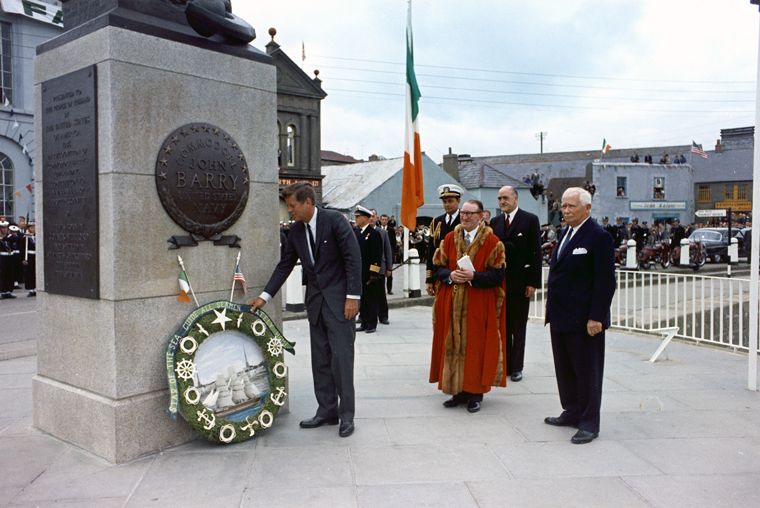
Wreath-laying ceremony at Commodore John Barry Memorial in Wexford in 1963. Pictured are: US President John F. Kennedy, Mayor of Wexford Thomas Burne, Minister of External Affairs of Ireland Frank Aiken, US Ambassador to Ireland Matthew McCloskey (r), Naval Aide to the President Tazewell Shepard

Aiken was minister for Finance after World War II; later, he was Minister for External Affairs from 1951 to 1954, and from 1957 to 1969.

The 'Aiken Plan' was introduced at the United Nations in an effort to combine disarmament and peace in the Middle East, Ireland a country being on good terms with both Israel and many Arab countries. In the UN the Irish delegation sat between Iraq and Israel forming a kind of physical 'buffer': in Aiken's time (who as a minister spent a lot of time with the UN delegation) both the Italians (who on their turn sat in the vicinity of the Iraqi delegation), the Irish and the Israelis claimed to be the one and only UN delegation of New York, a city inhabited by many Irish, Jewish and Italians. Aiken was also a champion of nuclear non-proliferation, for which he received the honour of being the first minister to sign the Treaty on the Non-Proliferation of Nuclear Weapons in 1968 at Moscow. Aiken's impact as Minister for External Affairs was such that he is sometimes referred to as the father of Irish foreign policy. His performance was praised in particular by a later Minister for Foreign Affairs, Fine Gael's Garret FitzGerald.

== Later years ==
Aiken retired from Ministerial office and as Tánaiste in 1969. During the Arms Crisis it is said that the Taoiseach, Jack Lynch, turned to Aiken for advice on a number of issues. Aiken retired from politics in 1973 due to the fact that Charles Haughey, whose style of politics Aiken strongly disliked, was allowed to run as a Fianna Fáil candidate in the 1973 general election. Initially he planned to announce the reason for his decision, but under pressure finally agreed to announce that he was retiring on medical advice.

=== Refusal of candidacy for the presidency of Ireland ===
After his retirement, the outgoing President of Ireland Éamon de Valera, sought to convince Aiken—one of his closest friends—to run for Fianna Fáil in the 1973 presidential election. However, Aiken refused all requests to run and the party finally selected Erskine H. Childers to be its candidate. Childers won the election.

== Family ==
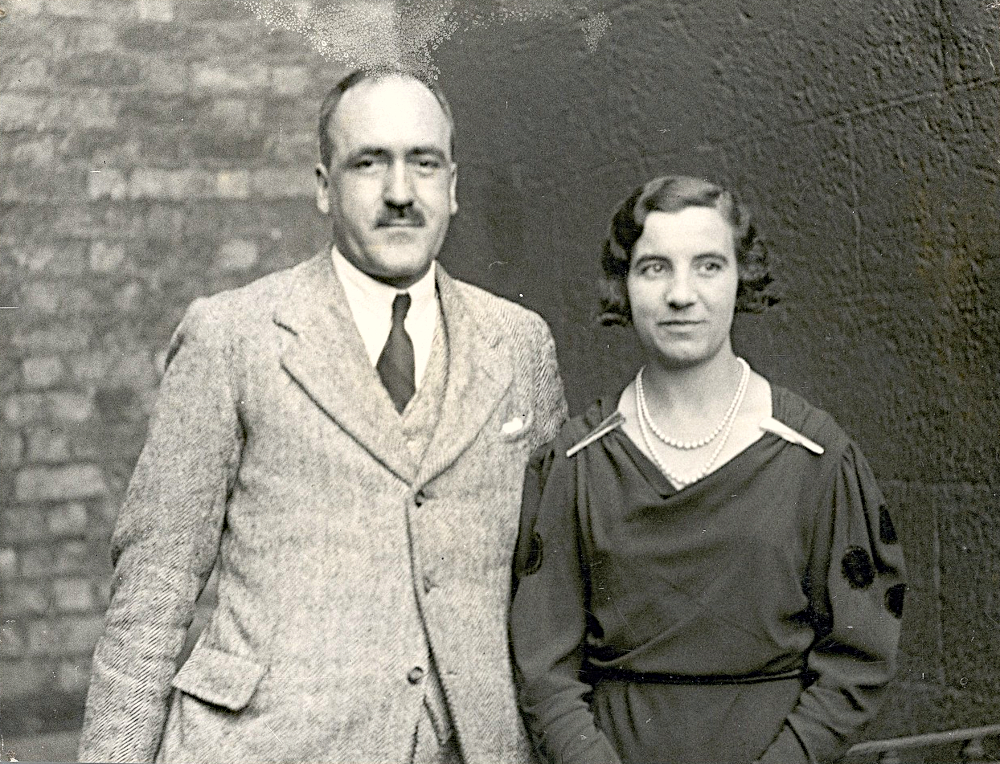
Photograph of Frank Aiken and Maud Davin, taken upon the announcement of their engagement in August 1934

In 1934 Aiken married Maud Davin, the director of the Dublin Municipal School of Music. The couple had three children. The couple first met in County Wicklow in the house of Aiken's friend, James Ryan, who helped encourage the relationship.

== Death ==
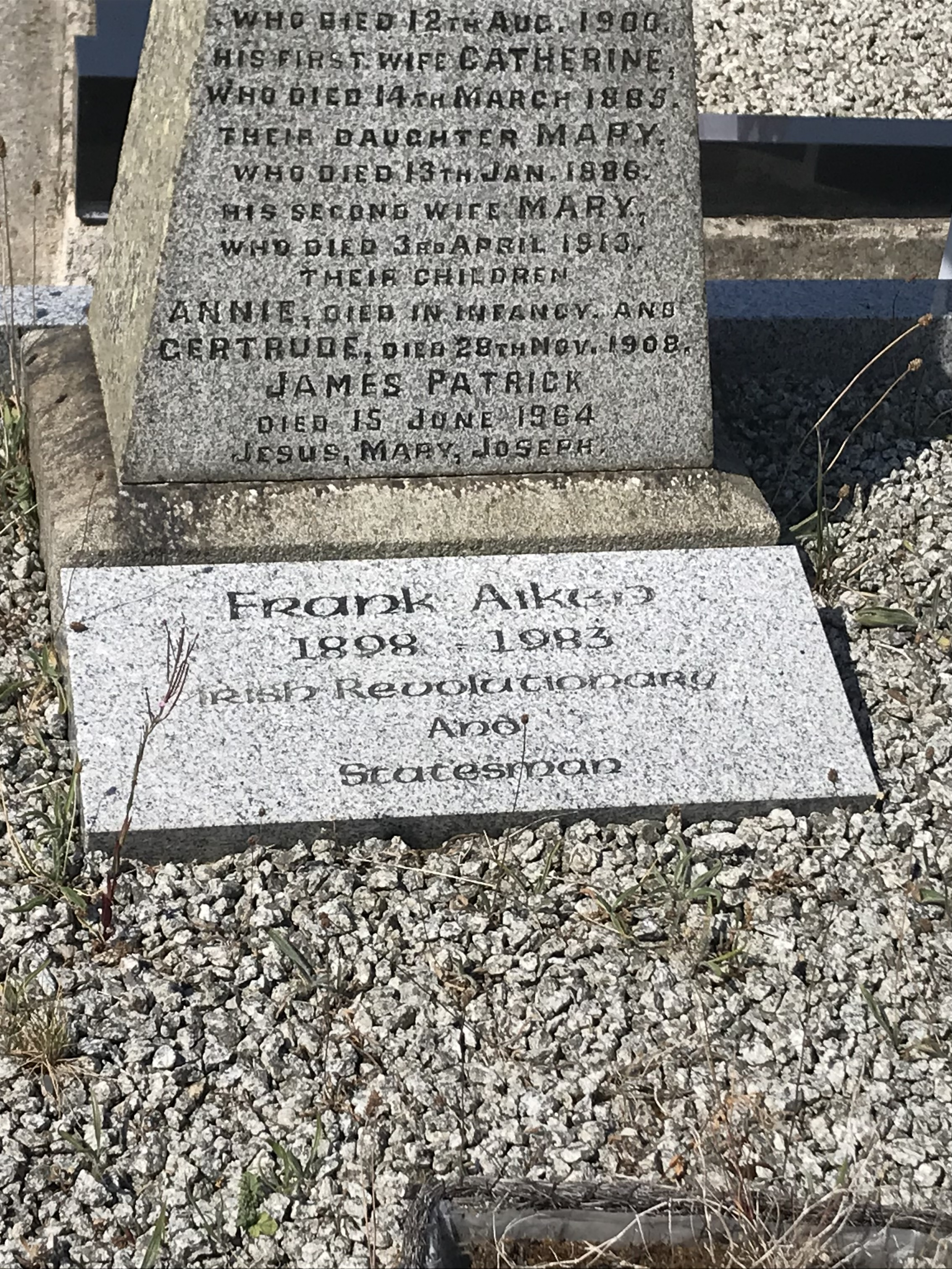
Aiken's headstone, Camlough, County Armagh

Frank Aiken died on 18 May 1983 in Dublin from natural causes at the age of 85. He was buried in his native Camlough, County Armagh, Northern Ireland.

=== Honours and memorials ===
Aiken received many decorations and honours, including honorary doctorates from the National University of Ireland and University College Dublin. He received the Grand Cross of St. Olav, the highest honour Norway can give to a foreigner, during a state visit to Norway in 1964. He was also a lifelong supporter of the Irish language. His son, also named Frank, ran unsuccessfully in the 1987 and 1989 general elections for the Progressive Democrats.

His wife died in a road accident in 1978. Having been denied the right, through an exclusion order, to attend his family home the former IRA Commander's dying wish was respected by local Fianna Fáil organisation, the Dundalk & District Old IRA and by the 27 Infantry Battalion of the barracks that now bears his name who followed his funeral cortege through Dundalk to the border out of respect to their fallen comrade. His former ministerial colleague, Seán MacEntee, gave the graveside oration.

Aiken Barracks in Dundalk, County Louth, now the headquarters of the 27 Infantry Battalion is named in his honour.

Political offices
Preceded by Desmond FitzGerald	Minister for Defence; 1932–1939	Succeeded by Oscar Traynor
Preceded by Joseph Connolly	Minister for Lands and Fisheries; 1936 (acting)	Succeeded by Gerald Boland
New office	Minister for the Co-ordination of Defensive Measures; 1939–1945	Office abolished
Preceded by Seán T. O'Kelly	Minister for Finance; 1945–1948	Succeeded by Patrick McGilligan
Preceded by Seán MacBride	Minister for External Affairs; 1951–1954	Succeeded by Liam Cosgrave
Preceded by James Dillon	Minister for Agriculture; 1957 (acting)	Succeeded by Seán Moylan
Preceded by Liam Cosgrave	Minister for External Affairs; 1957–1969	Succeeded by Patrick Hillery
Preceded by Seán Moylan	Minister for Agriculture; Nov. 1957 (acting)	Succeeded by Paddy Smith
Preceded by Seán MacEntee	Tánaiste; 1965–1969	Succeeded by Erskine H. Childers

Dáil	Election	Deputy (Party)	Deputy (Party)	Deputy (Party)	Deputy (Party)	Deputy (Party)
4th	1923	Frank Aiken (Rep)	Peter Hughes (CnaG)	James Murphy (CnaG)	3 seats until 1977	
5th	1927 (Jun)	Frank Aiken (FF)	James Coburn (NL)	James Murphy (CnaG)	3 seats until 1977	
6th	1927 (Sep)	Frank Aiken (FF)	James Coburn (NL)	James Murphy (CnaG)	3 seats until 1977	
7th	1932	Frank Aiken (FF)	James Coburn (Ind.)	James Murphy (CnaG)	3 seats until 1977	
8th	1933	Frank Aiken (FF)	James Coburn (Ind.)	James Murphy (CnaG)	3 seats until 1977	
9th	1937	Frank Aiken (FF)	James Coburn (FG)	Laurence Walsh (FF)	3 seats until 1977	
10th	1938	Frank Aiken (FF)	James Coburn (FG)	Laurence Walsh (FF)	3 seats until 1977	
11th	1943	Frank Aiken (FF)	James Coburn (FG)	Roddy Connolly (Lab)	3 seats until 1977	
12th	1944	Frank Aiken (FF)	James Coburn (FG)	Laurence Walsh (FF)	3 seats until 1977	
13th	1948	Frank Aiken (FF)	James Coburn (FG)	Roddy Connolly (Lab)	3 seats until 1977	
14th	1951	Frank Aiken (FF)	James Coburn (FG)	Laurence Walsh (FF)	3 seats until 1977	
14th	1954 by-election	Frank Aiken (FF)	George Coburn (FG)	Laurence Walsh (FF)	3 seats until 1977	
15th	1954	Frank Aiken (FF)	George Coburn (FG)	Paddy Donegan (FG)	3 seats until 1977	
16th	1957	Frank Aiken (FF)	George Coburn (FG)	Pádraig Faulkner (Note: Faulker served as Ceann Comhairle in the 21st Dáil from 1977 to 1981, and was returned automatically at the 1981 election.) (FF)	3 seats until 1977	
17th	1961	Frank Aiken (FF)	Paddy Donegan (FG)	Pádraig Faulkner (FF)	3 seats until 1977	
18th	1965	Frank Aiken (FF)	Paddy Donegan (FG)	Pádraig Faulkner (FF)	3 seats until 1977	
19th	1969	Frank Aiken (FF)	Paddy Donegan (FG)	Pádraig Faulkner (FF)	3 seats until 1977	
20th	1973	Joseph Farrell (FF)	Paddy Donegan (FG)	Pádraig Faulkner (FF)	3 seats until 1977	
21st	1977	Joseph Farrell (FF)	Paddy Donegan (FG)	Pádraig Faulkner (FF)	Eddie Filgate (FF)	4 seats 1977–2011
22nd	1981	Paddy Agnew (AHB)	Bernard Markey (FG)	Pádraig Faulkner (FF)	Eddie Filgate (FF)	4 seats 1977–2011
23rd	1982 (Feb)	Thomas Bellew (FF)	Bernard Markey (FG)	Pádraig Faulkner (FF)	Eddie Filgate (FF)	4 seats 1977–2011
24th	1982 (Nov)	Michael Bell (Lab)	Brendan McGahon (FG)	Pádraig Faulkner (FF)	Séamus Kirk (Note: Kirk served as Ceann Comhairle in the 30th Dáil from 2009 to 2011, and was returned automatically at the 2011 election.) (FF)	4 seats 1977–2011
25th	1987	Michael Bell (Lab)	Brendan McGahon (FG)	Dermot Ahern (FF)	Séamus Kirk (FF)	4 seats 1977–2011
26th	1989	Michael Bell (Lab)	Brendan McGahon (FG)	Dermot Ahern (FF)	Séamus Kirk (FF)	4 seats 1977–2011
27th	1992	Michael Bell (Lab)	Brendan McGahon (FG)	Dermot Ahern (FF)	Séamus Kirk (FF)	4 seats 1977–2011
28th	1997	Michael Bell (Lab)	Brendan McGahon (FG)	Dermot Ahern (FF)	Séamus Kirk (FF)	4 seats 1977–2011
29th	2002	Arthur Morgan (SF)	Fergus O'Dowd (FG)	Dermot Ahern (FF)	Séamus Kirk (FF)	4 seats 1977–2011
30th	2007	Arthur Morgan (SF)	Fergus O'Dowd (FG)	Dermot Ahern (FF)	Séamus Kirk (FF)	4 seats 1977–2011
31st	2011	Gerry Adams (SF)	Fergus O'Dowd (FG)	Ged Nash (Lab)	Séamus Kirk (FF)	Peter Fitzpatrick (FG)
32nd	2016	Gerry Adams (SF)	Fergus O'Dowd (FG)	Declan Breathnach (FF)	Imelda Munster (SF)	Peter Fitzpatrick (FG)
33rd	2020	Ruairí Ó Murchú (SF)	Fergus O'Dowd (FG)	Ged Nash (Lab)	Imelda Munster (SF)	Peter Fitzpatrick (Ind.)
34th	2024	Ruairí Ó Murchú (SF)	Paula Butterly (FG)	Ged Nash (Lab)	Joanna Byrne (SF)	Erin McGreehan (FF)
