= Matilda =

Matilda or Mathilda may refer to:

== Animals ==
- Matilda (chicken) (1990–2006), World's Oldest Living Chicken record holder
- Mathilda (gastropod), a genus of gastropods in the family Mathildidae
- Matilda (horse) (1824–1846), British Thoroughbred racehorse
- Matilda, a dog of the professional wrestling tag-team The British Bulldogs

== Arts and entertainment ==
=== Film ===
- Matilda (1978 film), an American comedy
- Matilda (1996 film), based on Roald Dahl's novel
- Matilda (2017 film), а Russian historical romantic drama
- Matilda the Musical (film) a Netflix adaptation of Matilda the Musical

=== Literature ===
- Matilda (Normanby novel), an 1825 novel by Lord Normanby
- Matilda (novel), a 1988 children's novel by Roald Dahl
- Mathilda (novella), a novella by Mary Shelley

=== Music ===
- "Waltzing Matilda", a song often described as Australia's “unofficial national anthem”
- Matilda (album), by Stateless, 2011
- "Matilda" (calypso song), composed by Norman Span (King Radio), which in 1953 became known from the version by Harry Belafonte
- "Matilda" (Alt-J song), 2012
- "Matilda" (Harry Styles song), 2022

=== Other uses in arts and entertainment ===
- Matilda the Musical, a 2010 stage musical based on Roald Dahl's novel
- Matilda Awards, Australian performance awards

== People ==
- Matilda (given name) (also Mathilda), a female given name

== Military ==
- Matilda I (tank), a British infantry tank 1938–1940
- Matilda II, a British infantry tank 1939–1955
- HMS Matilda, the name of two Royal Navy ships

== Other uses ==
- Matilda, a colloquial term for a swag (bedroll) carried by a swagman in the Australian bush
- Australia women's national soccer team, nicknamed Matildas
- Matilda (mascot), the mascot of the 1982 Commonwealth Games in Australia
- Matilda (ship), the name of several ships
- Matilda Cruises, an Australia ferry and cruise service
- MATILDA, a remote-controlled surveillance and reconnaissance robot
- Matilda effect, a bias against acknowledging the achievements of women scientists, whose work is consequently attributed to their male colleagues
- Matilda International Hospital, in Hong Kong

== See also ==
- Mathilde (disambiguation)
  - Matilde
