= Tilda Löthman-Koponen =

Finnish schoolteacher and politician (1874–1962)

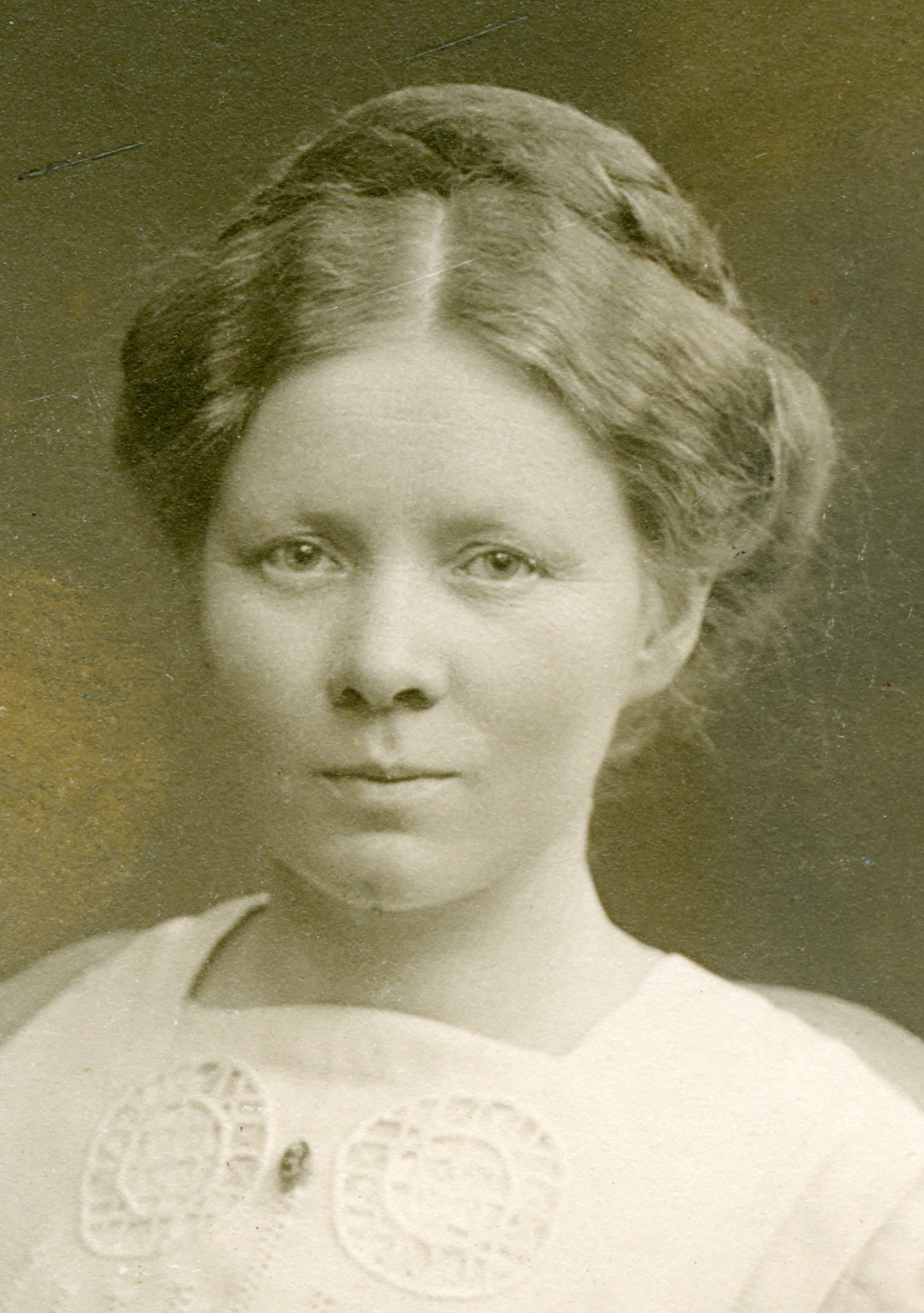
Tilda Löthman-Koponen

Matilda (Tilda) Aurora Löthman-Koponen (22 November 1874 – 17 March 1962; née Koponen) was a Finnish schoolteacher and politician, born in Leppävirta. She was a member of the Parliament of Finland from 1910 to 1911, from 1913 to 1916, from 1917 to 1919, from 1929 to 1930 and from 1933 to 1945, representing the Young Finnish Party until December 1918 and the Agrarian League after that. She was a presidential elector in the 1931, 1937, 1940 and 1943 presidential elections.
