= Matilda Booker =

African-American educator in Virginia

- Born: Matilda V. Mosley; September 18, 1887; Halifax County, Virginia
- Died: June 27, 1957 (aged 69); Cumberland County, Virginia
- Education: Virginia Normal and Industrial Institute
- Occupation: Educator

Matilda Booker (born Matilda V. Mosley; September 18, 1887 – June 27, 1957) was an American educator. Born in Halifax County to parents Killis Mosley and Tamara Smith Mosley, Booker began her education at thirteen, going on to become supervisor of two counties' then-segregated Black school districts. Her work in fundraising, advocating, and community-building led to the renovation of dilapidated school buildings, the building of new schools, the expansion of education offerings to include high school level programming, the funding of public transportation and dental clinics, and the equalization of salaries between Black and white educators. In 1940 Virginia State University (then Virginia State College for Negroes) presented Booker with a certificate of merit for her achievements in education. She died of heart disease in 1957.

== Education ==
Booker graduated from the Thyne Institute in Chase City, where she received a third class teaching certificate in 1909. She then studied at Virginia State University (then Virginia Normal and Industrial Institute) and graduated in 1911.

== Career ==
From 1913 to 1920, Booker was supervisor for twenty-four Black schools in Cumberland County, VA. As an educator with the Anna T. Jeanes Foundation, Booker was able to extend school terms, repair infrastructure, and increase teachers' salaries.

In 1920, she began overseeing 48 schools as the supervisor of Black education in nearby Mecklenburg County. Here, she worked to provide continuing education to teachers, and was instrumental in opening the first two area high schools for Black students.

By 1925, Booker had secured $1,500 from the Rosenwald Fund and encouraged parents to raise an additional $3,000 to construct a new school.

Booker then rallied community support for a Black public high school in Clarksville. According to alumni Ann Garnett Miller, West End High School opened in September 1935 with more than 100 students ages 13–22.

Booker retired from her position in 1955.

== Personal life ==
Booker married Samuel Glover Booker on May 24, 1916. The two operated a small farm, and ran a gas station which Samuel operated for 54 years. They had no children.

== Illness and death ==
Booker struggled with complications due to heart disease in the years following her retirement, and died in 1957.
