= Matilde =

- Gender: Female
- Name day: Latvia: 14 March

Other names
- Related names: Matilda

Matilde is an alternate spelling of the name Matilda and may refer to:

== People ==
- Matilde Borromeo (born 1983), Italian equestrian
- Matilde Calvo Rodero (1899–1982) Spanish printmaker and bookbinder
- Matilde Camus (1919–2012), Spanish poet
- Matilde Casazola (born 1942), Bolivian songwriter
- Matilde Cherner (1833–1880), Spanish writer and journalist
- Matilde Fernández (born 1950), Spanish feminist and politician
- Matilde Hidalgo (1889–1974), Ecuadorian politician
- Matilde Ladrón de Guevara (1910–2009), Chilean poet
- Matilde E. Moisant (1878–1964), American aviator
- Matilde Powers (born 1982), Danish politician
- Matilde Sánchez (born 1958), Argentine journalist
- Matilde Serao (1856–1927), Italian journalist
- Matilde de la Torre (1884–1946), Spanish writer, socialist and politician
- Matilde Urrutia (1912–1985), Chilean singer
- Matilde Villa (born 2004), Italian basketball player
- Matilde Zimmermann (born 1943), American author and professor

== Places ==
- Matilde, Argentina, town in Santa Fe Province, Argentina

== Other ==
- Matilde di Shabran (1821), an opera
- Santa Matilde (1977–1997), a car model

== See also ==
- Mathilde (disambiguation)
