= Princess Maud =

Princess Maud may refer to:

== People ==
- Maud of Wales, later Queen Maud of Norway, daughter of Edward VII of the United Kingdom
- Maud Carnegie, Countess of Southesk, granddaughter of Edward VII of the United Kingdom; known as "Her Highness Princess Maud" from 1905 to 1923

== Ships ==
- SS Princess Maud (1902)
- TSS Princess Maud (1934)

== See also ==
- Queen Maud (disambiguation)
- Maud (disambiguation)
