= Queen Maud =

Queen Maud may refer to:

== People ==
- Matilda of Flanders (1031–1083), Queen of England
- Maud of Northumbria (1074–1130/1131), Queen of Scotland & Countess of Huntingdon
- Matilda of Scotland (1080–1118), Queen of England
- Empress Matilda (1102–1167), Lady of the English
- Matilda I of Boulogne (1105–1152), Queen of England & Countess of Boulogne
- Matilda of Savoy (1125–1158), Queen of Portugal
- Matilda II of Boulogne (1202–1259), Queen of Portugal & Countess of Boulogne
- Maud of Wales (1869–1938), Queen of Norway

== Places ==
- Queen Maud Gulf, Canada
- Queen Maud Mountains in Antarctica
- Queen Maud Land in Antarctica

== Other ==
- Queen Maud University College in Trondheim, Norway

== See also ==
- Princess Maud (disambiguation)
