= Mathilde Sallier de La Tour =

French-Italian painter and writer (1838–1911)

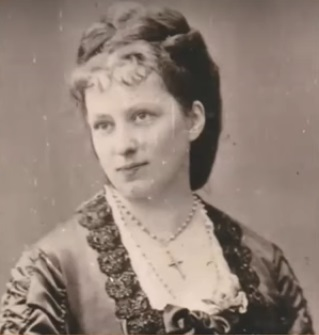
Mathilde Sallier de La Tour

Mathilde Sallier de La Tour, née Marie Mathilde Ruinart de Brimont, (1838–1911) was a French‑Italian painter and author, known for her travel writings and correspondence, and particularly those relating to her time in Japan in the late 1860s.

For her artwork produced later in life she used the pseudonym Paul Mahaut.

== Early life and family ==
Sallier de la Tour was born in Paris on 12 December 1838 into the French aristocratic Ruinart de Brimont family. Her parents were Marie‑Laure Ruinart de Brimont (née de Chabrol‑Chaméane) and Jean‑Arthur Ruinart de Brimont, a counsellor at the Cour des comptes. She was the granddaughter of two deputies from the Bourbon Restoration era.

== Marriage and life in Japan ==
In 1867, Mathilde married Vittorio Sallier de La Tour, an Italian nobleman and diplomat, after an initial familial objection due to his gambling habits. Vittorio was also Mathilde's brother-in-law as Mathilde's elder sister had previously married Vittorio's brother. Shortly after their marriage, the couple were posted to Japan, where Vittorio served as Italy's minister plenipotentiary.

During this period, Mathilde kept detailed letters, travel journals, notes, and sketches that document her experiences, observations, and reflections on Japan, and her life in Yokohama and Edo. These writings provide a rare female perspective on Japan during the transition from the late Edo to early Meiji period and include the earliest known travel journal by a woman exploring the country's inner regions.

== Later life and career ==
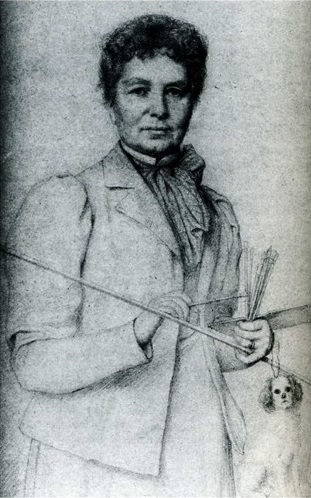
Portrait of Mathilde Sallier de La Tour

After returning from Japan in 1870, Mathilde and her husband were posted to Stockholm. During this period, she developed a close intellectual and possibly romantic friendship with the writer Arthur de Gobineau. This relationship contributed to her later life in Rome, a city where she moved in influential social and artistic circles and maintained cultural pursuits.

She devoted her later years primarily to painting, studying under the Italian history painter Andrea Gastaldi. Her studio was at the rue Chaptal residence of Cornelia Scheffer. At the Paris Salon, she exhibited under the pseudonym Paul Mahaut.

Notable pieces include Portrait of the Count de Gobineau (1876), A Vestal (1879) and Portrait of Arthur Symons (1898).

Mathilde Sallier de La Tour died in Rome on 27 March 1911.

== Legacy ==
A two‑volume scholarly edition of Sallier de La Tour's writings, including letters, notes, and sketches, has been released, offering both original French texts and English translations for researchers and historians.

Her collection of letters and artistic works related to Gobineau is an important part of the Gobineau collection in the Bibliothèque nationale et universitaire in Strasbourg.
