= Maud Tindal Atkinson =

English artist

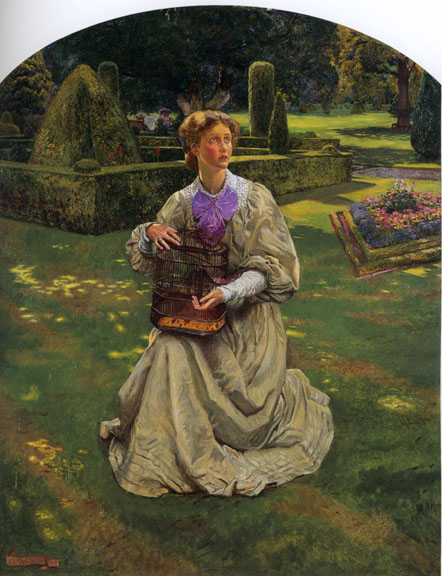
- The Bird in a Cage, a portrait of Maud Tindal Atkinson by Byam Shaw (1907)
- Born: Amy Maud Tindal Atkinson; 26 November 1875; Shortlands, England
- Died: 20 May 1954 (aged 78); London

Amy Maud Tindal Atkinson (26 November 1875 – 20 May 1954) was an English artist, active in the 20th century, who exhibited paintings at the Royal Academy. She had no children and it is unknown if she at any time was married.

== Biography ==
Atkinson was born at Shortlands, near Bromley in Kent, to Henry Tindal Atkinson, a county judge and his wife Marion Lewin. She had three sisters Ethel, Enid and Doris, and one brother Edward, later Sir Edward, Hale Tindal Atkinson, who served as the Director of Public Prosecutions from 1930 to 1944. Atkinson exhibited fifteen paintings at the Royal Academy from 1906 to 1937.

Atkinson studied at the Art Department of Kings College for Women, in Kensington, under Byam Shaw. In 1906, Byam Shaw exhibited at the Royal Academy a full-length watercolour portrait of her, entitled "Maud, Daughter of His Honour Judge Tindal Atkinson." The painting is reproduced in Rex Vicat Cole's "Art and Life of Byam Shaw" (London: Seeley Service, 1932), with the following commentary: "[This work] a water-colour is life-size, of a beautiful sitter, one of his students; her portrait appears in many illustrations [by Byam Shaw] of this and a later period, and in the picture entitled "The Caged Bird" and in the wistful face of the girl to the right of the picture "The New Voice". Her natural charm, added to a gift for understanding what was in the artist's mind, as well as an admiration for his work and sympathetic help, made her a valued friend and an ideal sitter."(p.142). "The New Voice", reproduced by Cole (p. 158) was exhibited at the Royal Academy in 1909. In it, Atkinson appears naked to the waist: it is a strikingly eroticised portrayal unintentionally reminiscent of soft pornography of the Edwardian era, and indicates that she was by no means hidebound by Edwardian convention. This bizarre painting, somewhat similar to works of a decade earlier by the German painter Arnold Boecklin, represents 'a group of pagans' in the evening light (rather similar to those in early productions of Ravel's Diaghilev ballet 'Daphnis and Chloe', 1912) who suddenly notice the diminutive figure of St John the Baptist on a distant hillside, proclaiming the Christian message. Byam Shaw was a committed Anglican and doubtless painted the work as a sincere contribution to Christian art; yet its erotic elements outstrip its moralizing intentions, leaving a distinctly ambivalent impression on the viewer. Byam Shaw placed his signature in a cartouche in the shape of a scroll, giving rise to the nickname 'the Scroll School' for himself and his friends Eleanor Fortescue-Brickdale and Frank Cadogan Cowper. Atkinson used a similar device to support her own signature on works in watercolour.

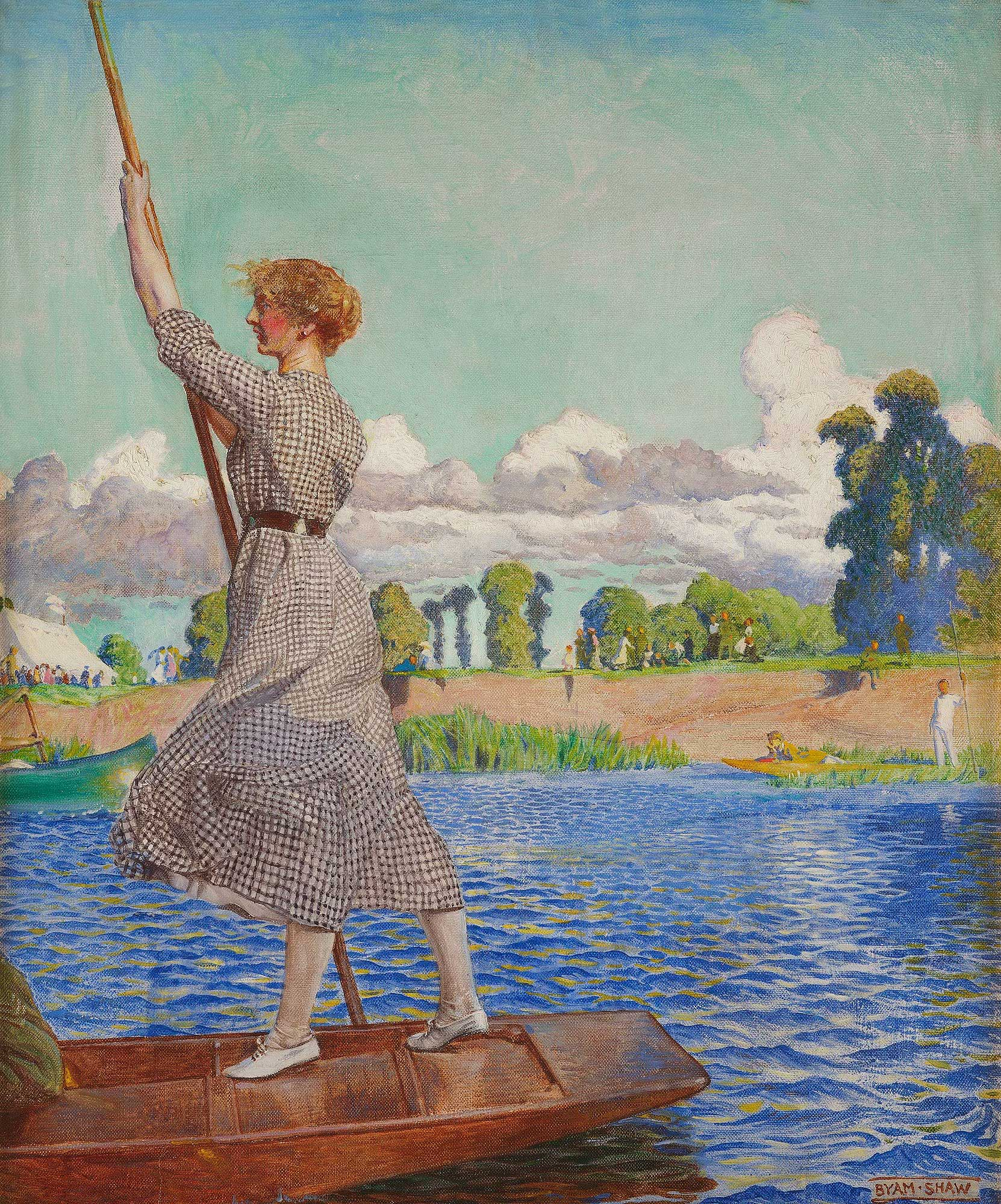
The Regatta, a portrait of Maud Tindal Atkinson by Byam Shaw

Atkinson continued to model for Byam Shaw throughout his career, notably for his oil painting "The Regatta". This painting, created during the First World War, depicts Atkinson twisted in movement as she rows a boat across a lake. The vibrancy of this work draws inspiration from the Pre-Raphaelite and Aesthetic movement. Atkinson, depicted in a black-and-white checked dress, stands out against a palette of blue and green hues. Byam Shaw's focus on her as the sole subject in this painting demonstrates the closeness of their friendship. As with his other paintings of Atkinson, Byam Shaw's signature is present as a scroll-cartouche.

In 1915 Atkinson painted 'Ariel', a character from Shakespeare's The Tempest. It was at one time with the Maas Gallery in London and is now in the collection of Sam Elliott. The work has been reproduced commercially on several book jackets including "The Fairyland Companion" and "The Fairy Garden" by Beatrice Phillpotts.

Atkinson was a member of The Royal Society of Miniaturists in London and illustrated several children's books, including E. H. Paine, 'The Land of Nice New Clothes. Pictured by Maud Tindal Atkinson', London: Blackie and Son, 1921; Catherine Henrietta Milnes Gaskell,'Lady Ann's Fairy Tales ... With twelve illustrations ... by Maud Tindal Atkinson', London: printed for the author, 1914; S. J. Looker, ed., 'My Favourite Nursery Rhymes' Illustrations ... by Maud Tindal Atkinson', London: Daniel O'Connor, 1922; May H Brahe and Madge Dickson'Spindrift : five songs', with illustrations by Maud Tindal Atkinson, London; New York: Enoch & Sons, 1921.

== Works ==
Atkinson's work includes the following:

- Pansy with the fairies
- Portrait of Tommy 1916
- Portrait of George 1916
- The red shoes
- A group of Landscape and figure subjects
- The balcony
- Rose still life
- Sir Galahad
- The pity of the woods
- The flower girl
- Building Sandcastles
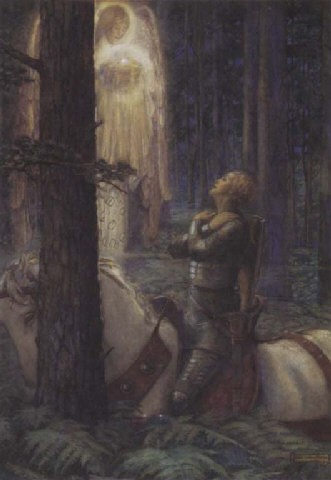
Sir Galahad

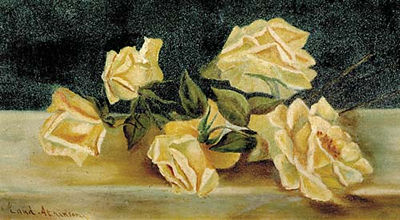
Rose Still Life

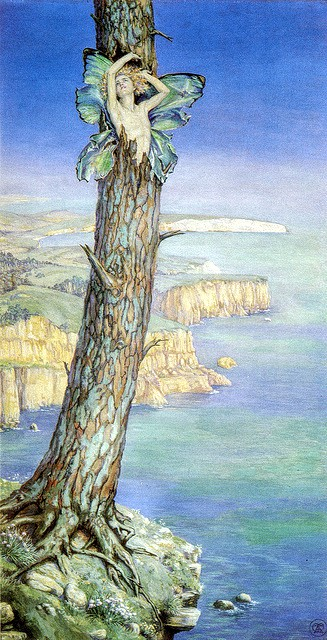
Ariel (1915)

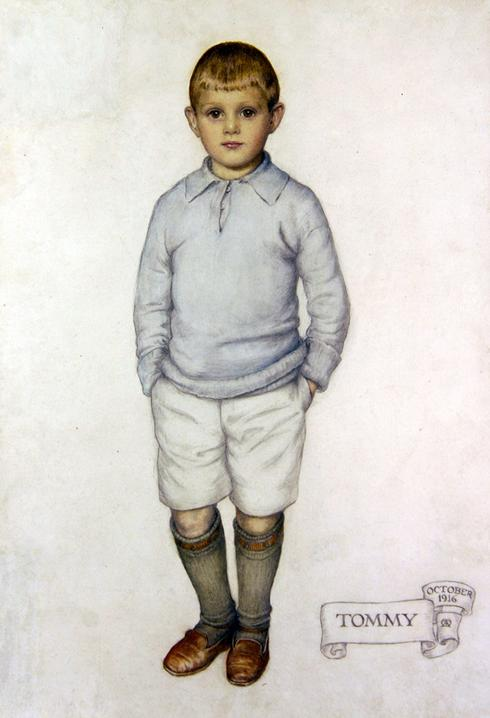
Tommy (1916)
