= Matilda Penne =

English businessperson

Matilda Penne (died 1393), was an English businessperson of the fourteenth century, whose will survives.

She inherited a skinning business from her late spouse, who died in 1379. She belonged to the elite of her craft and was described as one of the most prominent skinners in the city of London. She enjoyed great respect among her colleagues, who referred apprentices to her, and she is registered to have educated many student skinners in her trade. She is one of few women skinners of the period of whom there are any significant amount of information.

She left money to several churches and religious institutions.
