= SS Maudie =

1920 Norwegian and Finnish tanker

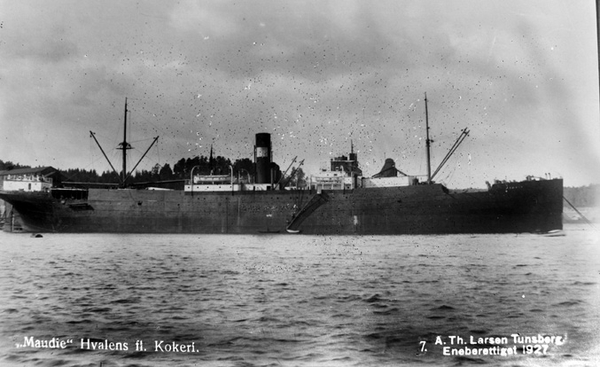
- SS Maudie

History
- Name: Maudie (1920-38); Angra (1938-42); Mercator (1942-45); Empire Crouch (1945-46); Mercator (1946-56); Ruth Nurminen (1956-59)
- Owner: A/S Hvalen (1920-29); A/S Hektor (1929-37); Rederi AB Atlanta-Laivanvarustaja OY Atlanta (1937-42); A/B Finland-Amerika Lijnen [Finland America Line] (1942-44); Kriegsmarine (1944); Atlas Reederi AG (1944-45); Ministry of War Transport (1945); Ministry of Transport (1945-48); AB Finland — Amerika Linjen OY [Finland America Line] (1948-52); Suomen Höyrylaiva OY — Finska Ångfartygs AB [Finsk Line] (1952-56); John Nurminen OY (1956-59)
- Operator: N Bugge (1920-37); Birger Krogius (1937-38); Rederi AB Atlanta-Laivanvarustaja OY Atlanta (1938-42); A/B Finland-Amerika Linjen [Finland America Line] (1942-44); Schulte & Bruns (1944-45); Gibbs & Co Ltd (1945-46); AB Finland — Amerika Linjen OY [Finland America Line] (1946-52); Suomen Höyrylaiva OY — Finska Ångfartygs AB [Finsk Line] (1952-56); John Nurminen OY (1956-59)
- Port of registry: (Norway) Tønsberg (1920-37); (Finland) Helsinki (1937-44); (Nazi Germany) Emden (1944-45); United Kingdom (1945-46); (Finland) Helsinki (1946-59)
- Builder: Lithgows Ltd
- Yard number: 725
- Launched: 30 July 1920
- Completed: 1920
- Out of service: 11 September 1941
- Identification: Finnish Official Number 803 (1937-43); Code Letters LBDM (1920-34); Code Letters OFAJ (1937-44); Code Letters DKML (1944- ); Code Letters DVQB ( -1945); Finnish Official Number 803 (1947-59); Code Letters OFAJ (1946-59)
- Captured: by Nazi Germany on 16 September 1944; by the Allies in May 1945
- Fate: Scrapped

General characteristics
- Class & type: Tanker (1920-37); Cargo ship (1937-59)
- Tonnage: 4,661 GRT (1920-48); 4,748 GRT (1948-55); 4,631 GRT (1955-59); 2,757 NRT (1920-48); 2,740 NRT (1948-59)
- Length: 384 ft 7 in (117.22 m)
- Beam: 52 ft 0 in (15.85 m)
- Draught: 24 ft 3 in (7.39 m) (1920-42); 23 ft 9 in (7.24 m) (1942-44); 23 feet 11 inches (7.29 m) (1944-47); 24 feet 1 inch (7.34 m) (1947-54); 23 feet 6 inches (7.16 m) (1954-59)
- Depth: 26 ft 2 in (7.98 m) (1920-55); 26 ft 7 in (8.10 m) (1955-59)
- Ice class: IIA
- Propulsion: Triple expansion steam engine, single screw propeller
- Speed: 10 knots (19 km/h)

Maudie was a 4,661 GRT tanker that was built in 1920 by Lithgows, Port Glasgow, Scotland. Laid down as War Peshwa for the British Shipping Controller, she was completed as Maudie for a Norwegian company. In 1937, she was sold to Finland and renamed Angra. A further sale in 1942 saw her renamed Mercator.

She was seized by Germany in 1944 and then seized by the United Kingdom as a prize of war, passing to the Ministry of War Transport (MoWT) as Empire Crouch. In 1946, she was returned to her Finnish owner and regained her former name Mercator. A sale in 1956 saw her renamed Ruth Nurminen. She served until scrapped in 1959.

== Description ==
The ship was built in 1920 by Lithgows Ltd, Port Glasgow. She was Yard Number 725.

The ship was 384 feet 7 inches (117.22 m) long, with a beam of 52 feet 0 inches (15.85 m). As built, she had a depth of 26 feet 2 inches (7.98 m), and a draught of 24 feet 3 inches (7.39 m). She was assessed at 4,661 GRT. 2,757 NRT.

The ship was propelled by a 2,650 nhp triple expansion steam engine., which had cylinders of 26 inches (66 cm), 43 inches (110 cm) and 70 inches (180 cm) diameter by 48 inches (120 cm) stroke. The engine was built by Rankin & Blackmore, Greenock. It drove a single screw propeller and could propel the ship at 10 knots (19 km/h). She was assessed as Ice Class IIA.

== History ==
Laid down as War Peshwa for the British Shipping Controller, she was launched as Maudie on 30 July 1920. Maudie was a whale oil refinery ship, she was owned by A/S Hvalen, Tønsberg, Norway and operated under the management of N Bugge. The Code Letters LBDM were allocated. In 1929, she was sold to A/S Hektor, Tonsberg. On 9 January 1937, Maudie was sold to Rederi AB Atlanta-Laivanvarustaja OY Atlanta, Helsinki. Her port of registry was Helsinki. The Code Letters OFAJ and Finnish Official Number 804 were allocated. Converted to a dry cargo ship, she was operated under the management of Birger Krogius, Helsinki until 1938. On 14 January, she was renamed Angra. On 5 February, she arrived at Turku for conversion to a cargo ship by Ab Crichton-Vulcan Oy. In 1942, Angra was sold to AB Finland — Amerika Linjen OY (Finland America Line) and renamed Mercator, in place of an earlier ship of that name which had been sunk by enemy action on 1 December 1939. Her draught was assessed as 23 feet 9 inches (7.24 m)

=== Interned Finnish Seamen of the Second World War ===
On 2 September 1944, Mercator was loading coal at Danzig when Germany broke off relations with Finland. Loading was stopped and her cargo was discharged on 5 September. She attempted to leave Danzig on 12 September but was prevented from doing so. On 16 September, Mercator was seized by Germany, passing to the Kriegsmarine on 24 September. Her crew were interned at Stutthof until May 1945.

On 16 October 1944, Mercator was placed under the ownership of Atlas Reederi AG. She was placed under the management of Schulte & Bruns, Emden. Her draught was assessed as 23 feet 11 inches (7.29 m). The Code Letters DKML were allocated. These were later changed to DVQB. Mercator was seized in May 1945 at Copenhagen, Denmark. On 11 September, she was brought before the Prize Court as a prize of war. Mercator was passed to the MoWT and renamed Empire Crouch. In 1946, she was chartered to the Finnish Government and renamed Mercator. She was reallocated her former Official Number and Code Letters. Mercator was operated by her former owners, to whom she was returned in 1948. Mercator was assessed as 4,748 GRT, 2,740 NRT, with her draught assessed as 24 feet 1 inch (7.34 m).

In 1951, Mercator was sold to Suomen Höyrylaiva OY — Finska Ångfartygs AB (Finsk Line), Helsinki. In 1955, her draught was reassessed as 23 feet 6 inches (7.16 m) In 1957, she was sold to John Nurminen OY, Helsinki, and was renamed Ruth Nurminen. She was assessed as 4,631 GRT, with a depth of 26 feet 7 inches (8.10 m). Ruth Nurminen served until 1959, arriving on 4 April at Yokohama, Japan for scrapping.

== Notes ==
1. See rationale at talk page as to the usability of this source.
