= Tilda Norberg =

American minister, therapist and author

Tilda Norberg (born July 2, 1941) is a Christian minister, therapist and author. Norberg is the founder and first president of Gestalt Pastoral Care, Inc., a school of pastoral care that combines Christian healing practice with principles of gestalt theoretical psychotherapy. An ordained Methodist minister, Norberg is the author of six books on therapy, healing and Christian theology. Gestalt Pastoral Care Associates, Inc., is a nonprofit foundation dedicated to the teaching and ethical practice of Christian healing ministry using a gestalt approach, described by Norberg as "an amalgam of Gestalt Modalities, spiritual companioning, and contemplative prayer". Norberg is a graduate of Michigan State University (1963) and Union Theological Seminary, NY (M.Div., 1966), and later trained at The Gestalt Center in Princeton, NJ, and The Gestalt Institute of Canada in Vancouver, BC.

On Easter Sunday in 1958, at the age of 16, Norberg personally witnessed the crash of Capital Airlines Flight 67 while she was awaiting its arrival into Tri City Airport, MI. Both of her parents were killed in the crash, and Norberg has reported that this experience profoundly affected her understanding of spirituality and the need for healing in all persons. Her book Ashes Transformed: Healing From Trauma is based on similar stories of survivors of the September 11 attacks in New York City, which she witnessed from her office on Staten Island.

From 1976 to 1982 Norberg was a member of the faculty of The New Institute for Gestalt Therapy, New York. She has maintained a private practice in Gestalt Pastoral Care since 1970 and was the founder and since 1982 has been director of a two-year basic training program for clergy, therapists and other professionals in Gestalt Pastoral Care. In 2004 Norberg inaugurated a two-year advanced Gestalt Pastoral Care curriculum and internship program in Gestalt Pastoral Care.

In 2010 Norberg was elected the first president of the Gestalt Pastoral Care Associates, Inc., a nonprofit foundation which supports the development of training programs in gestalt care ministry for clergy and laity. Norberg is ordained by the Metropolitan Association of the United Church of Christ and was received as a ministerial member of the New York Conference of the United Methodist Church in 1985. In addition to her life's work in Gestalt Pastoral Care, Norberg has been active in justice ministries such as prison ministry, gay rights and women's rights.

In fulfillment of a dream of Norberg's, Gestalt Pastoral Care has been formally studied to evaluate its clinical efficacy which has been observed in practice over the past 40 years. The Grace Examined research study, administered by Brigham Young University and funded through the Templeton Foundation, was conducted from 2018 through 2020. Grace Examined evaluated Gestalt Pastoral Care Spiritually Integrated Strategies For Clinical Effectiveness. The study utilized empirically validated scales revealing that both individual sessions and group retreats (called Opening to Grace) produced unequivocally positive results showing significant reductions in: depression, anxiety, trauma symptoms and spiritual issues.
