= Matilda Maranda Crawford =

American poet

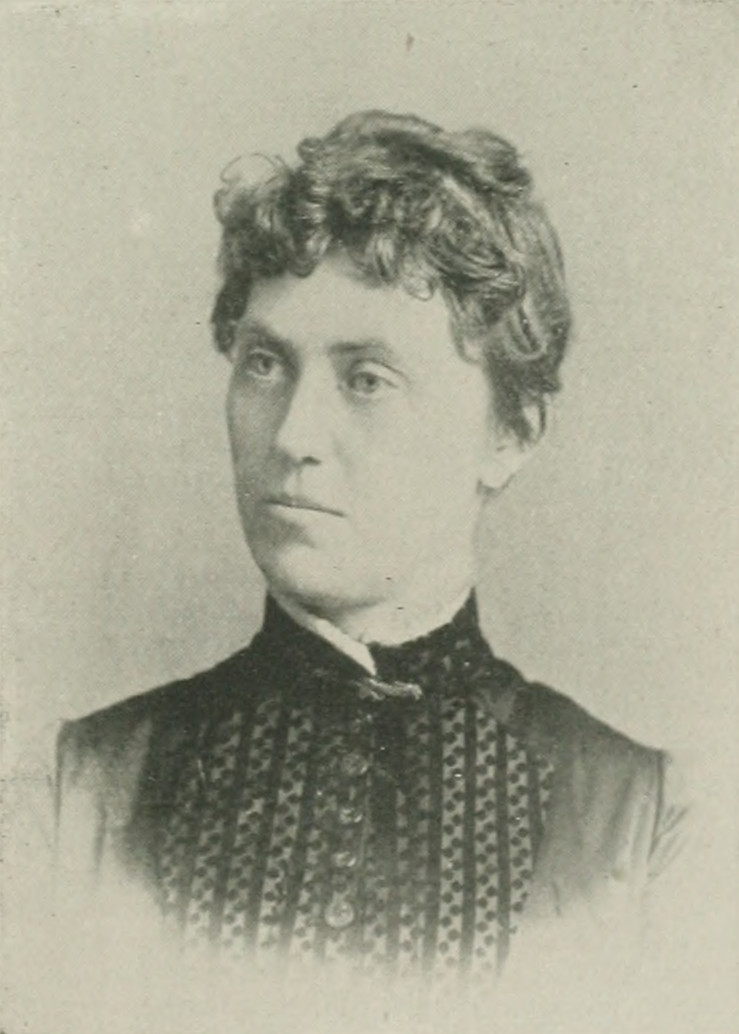
- Crawford in "A Woman of the Century"
- Born: Matilda Maranda Quackenbush; July 21, 1844; Clay, New York, U.S.
- Died: December 24, 1920 (aged 76); Toronto, Ontario, Canada
- Resting place: Port Hope Union Cemetery, Port Hope, Ontario, Canada
- Occupations: newspaper correspondent; poet; teacher
- Spouse: John Crawford (m. 1871; died 1912)
- Writing career
- Pen name: Maude Moore; M. M.; Mrs. John Crawford
- Language: English
- Notable works: Songs of All Seasons, Climes and Times: A Motley Jingle of Jumbled Rhymes

Signature
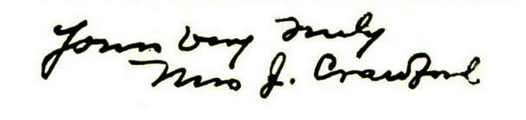

Matilda Maranda Crawford (née Quackenbush; 21 July 1844 – 24 December 1920) was an American-Canadian newspaper correspondent and poet. Songs of All Seasons, Climes and Times: A Motley Jingle of Jumbled Rhymes was published in 1890. She was known by her pen names Maude Moore, M. M., and Mrs. John Crawford. In addition to contributing to the literary press, Crawford was engaged in teaching.

== Early life and education ==
Matilda (nicknames Mattie or Maty) Maranda Quackenbush was born in Clay, New York, near Syracuse, 21 July 1844. (Note: Willard & Livermore note the date of birth as 21 July 1850.) She was of German ancestry. Her father, Garret Quackenbush, was a laborer, and her mother, Sarah Reese, was a tailor.

In 1851, Crawford, her mother, and five older siblings removed to Consecon, Prince Edward County, Canada West, where Crawford attended a grammar school. Gifted with an active and retentive memory, each bit of poetry she heard was remembered, and when but a child, she recited at one time the whole of Oliver Goldsmith 's The Deserted Village. Quick to learn, by the age of twelve, she was at the head of her classes, but at this point, had not written a composition.

== Career ==
As an adult, Crawford lived in Michigan for some time, and while there, she was engaged in teaching. It was at that point that she began to contribute to the literary press. In 1868, she returned to Canada, locating in Newtonville, Ontario. While there, she wrote for various Canadian and American newspapers as a pastime.

In 1871, she married John Crawford (1840-1912), of Clarke, Ontario. (Note: Moulton states John Crawford was of Clarke, Michigan.) She had two children, a boy and girl (Maude). For a few years, she focused on domestic responsibilities and did not write. In 1887, an entire summer's illness afforded her leisure time for literary work, and thereafter, she wrote for the press again using various pen names, including "Maude Moore", "M. M.", and "Mrs. John Crawford".

== Death ==
Crawford died of a stroke in Toronto, Ontario, Canada on 24 December 1920, and was buried at Port Hope Union Cemetery.

== Selected works ==
Songs of all seasons, climes and times - a motley jingle of jumbled rhymes

- Songs of All Seasons, Climes and Times: A Motley Jingle of Jumbled Rhymes (1890)
