= Maud Morgan (harpist) =

American harpist (1860–1941)

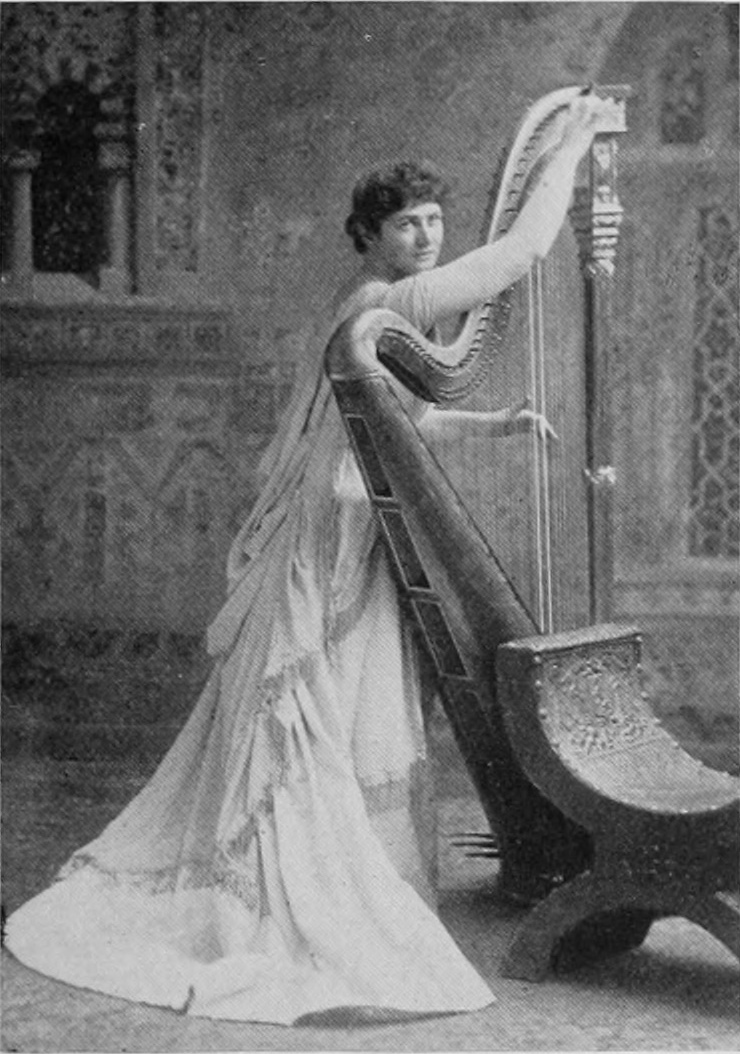

Background information
- Born: November 22, 1860; New York City, New York, U.S.
- Died: December 2, 1941 (aged 81); Richmond Memorial Hospital, Staten Island, New York, U.S.
- Occupation: Harpist
- Years active: Over 60 years

Maud Morgan (November 22, 1860 – December 2, 1941) was an American harpist who had a long and distinguished career spanning over 60 years. She was one of the pioneering solo harpists on the American concert stage, and ranked among the most famous and influential harpists in history. She is considered the first American to perform as a solo harpist on the American concert stage.

== Biography ==
=== Early life and training ===
Maud Morgan was born in New York City in 1860 to parents of English-Irish descent. Her father was George Washbourne Morgan, a noted organist originally from Gloucester, England, who had immigrated to New York in 1853. He was related to the Lord Mayor of London and had performed for Queen Victoria when she was still a princess.

From a young age, Morgan showed prodigious musical talents. She began piano lessons at age 5 but soon transitioned to focusing on the harp. Morgan received an extensive musical education under her father's tutelage, studying theory, technique, and performance. She later practiced the harp specifically with renowned harpist Alfred Toulmin.

=== Performance career ===
Morgan made her debut as a harpist in the 1870s at age 11/12, performing alongside prominent Norwegian violinist Ole Bull. This launched a highly successful concert career that would span over six decades.

[...] there were no teachers of the harp in America when I studied. I studied at home and all alone. I had to take piano music and adapt it to the harp.

— Maud Morgan, In "A Harpist's Love," The Morning Call, March 15, 1893

She is considered the first American solo harpist to perform on the American concert stage. As a soloist, Morgan appeared with many of the preeminent musicians and conductors of her time, including Fritz Kreisler, Moritz Rosenthal, Teresa Carreno, Italo Campanini, and Horatio Parker. Her performances were attended by European royalty, as well as U.S. Presidents and First Ladies.

In addition to touring widely as a soloist across the United States, Morgan frequently joined her father for joint concerts early in her career until his death. She made several tours of Europe as well, receiving acclaim overseas.

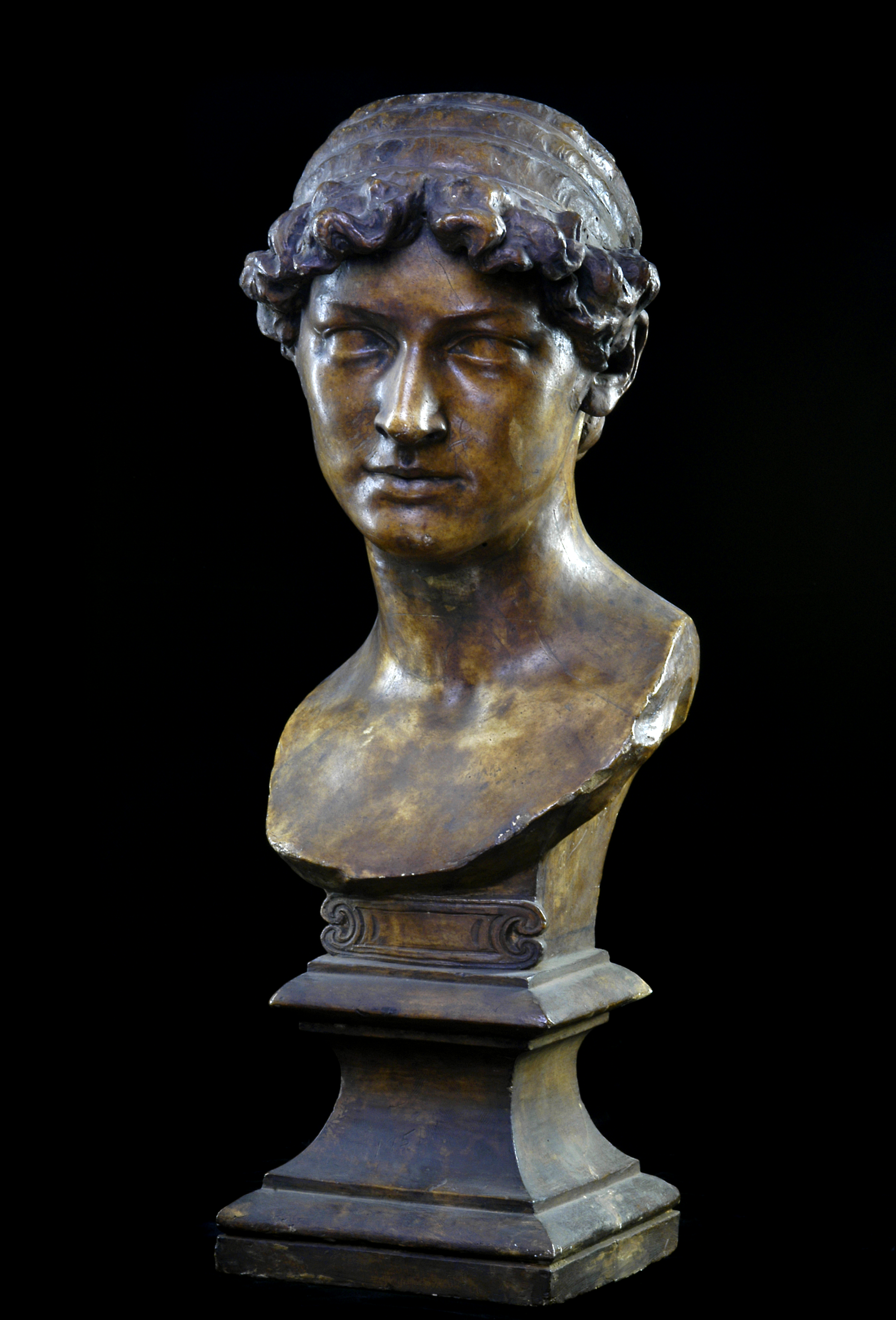
Bust of Maud Morgan by Olin Levi Warner

In 1924, a grand "Golden Jubilee" celebration was held at Carnegie Hall to honor Morgan's 50 years on stage as a harpist. The gala featured 50 harpists, including many of her former students, performing alongside choral groups in what was described as a "forest of harps." Morgan, then age 64, was crowned with silver hair and seated at a golden harp, presenting "a picture of uncommon charm."

=== Artistic depictions ===
In addition to her musical acclaim, Morgan's visage was immortalized in sculpture by Olin Levi Warner. His bust portrait of the young Morgan, completed around 1880, became one of Warner's most celebrated works and is part of the collection at the Metropolitan Museum of Art in New York City. It was also exhibited at the Smithsonian American Art Museum.

Critics praised how Warner integrated classical Greek sculptural influences like the tilted head, wide eyes, and braided hairstyle with naturalistic modeling of Morgan's delicate facial features. The treatment reflects Warner's academic training in the French Beaux-Arts tradition under Jean-Baptiste Carpeaux. Warner may have been inspired to sculpt Morgan after seeing her perform live, though there is no direct evidence he was commissioned for the bust.

The bust displays the irregular shoulder truncation that was a signature technique of Warner's and his instructor Carpeaux. The Met's cast was one of eleven Warner sculptures donated by the National Sculpture Society after his death in 1896, with the bronzes cast from his original plasters by Tiffany & Co.

=== Later years and legacy ===
Even after achieving emeritus status, Morgan maintained an active performing schedule into her 70s. In 1933 at age 72, she excitedly embarked on what she called a "spree" touring England and Scotland, defiantly declaring she would "rest when I please."

One of her final public performances was in November 1933 at a memorial concert unveiling in Brooklyn. Morgan remained engaged in the Staten Island arts community, holding leadership roles in music societies like the Central Society of Harpists, where she was honorary president.

She died on December 2, 1941, at age 81 in Richmond Memorial Hospital of Staten Island following injuries from a fall at her home sustained on December 8, 1940.

== Sources ==
=== Books ===
- Moulton, Charles (1893). Willard, Frances E.; Livermore, Mary A. (eds.). Woman of the Century: Fourteen Hundred-Seventy Biographical Sketches Accompanied by Portraits of Leading American Women in All Walks of Life. Buffalo, Chicago, New York: Charles Wells Moulton. p. 521.

=== Papers ===
- Lane, Chelsea (2022). "The Feminine Harp as Feminist Tool: Early Professional Footing for Women in Mid-Twentieth-Century America". The City University of New York: 63.
- Dreiser, Theodre (1967). "The Harp". American Harp Journal. 1 (2). American Harp Society: 10–14 – via FLIPHTML5.
