= Maud Woodward =

American politician (1885–1965)

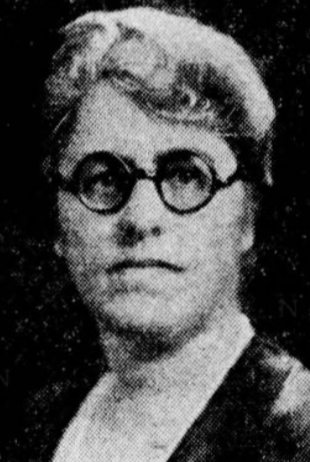

Member of the Connecticut House of Representatives from Bolton
- In office 1925–1931
- Preceded by: Charles F. Sumner
- Succeeded by: David C. Toomey
- In office 1935–1947
- Preceded by: Milton W. Haling
- Succeeded by: Ralph Q. Broll

Personal details
- Born: July 18, 1885 Tolland, Connecticut, U.S.
- Died: March 4, 1965 (aged 79)
- Party: Republican
- Spouse: Samuel R. Woodward (died 1947)

Maud L. Woodward (July 18, 1885 – March 4, 1965) was an American politician who served in the Connecticut House of Representatives from 1925 to 1931 and 1935 to 1947, representing the town of Bolton as a Republican.

== Personal life ==
Woodward was born in Tolland, Connecticut, on July 18, 1885, to parents Gideon and Amy Andrews Brown. She attended high school in Rockville, during which time her father served a term as a state representative. She became a member of the Ladies of the Maccabees around 1912.

Woodward was a resident of Bolton, where she lived on a farm with her husband, Samuel R. Woodward, who served as a state representative from 1917 to 1919. The couple remained together until Samuel's death in 1947.

== Career ==
Woodward was first elected to the Connecticut House of Representatives in 1924, and she served three terms representing the town of Bolton as a Republican. During her first term, she served on the school fund and state library committees. During her second term, she served on the humane institutions and joint rules committees. She was not a candidate for reelection in 1930 and was succeeded by David C. Toomey.

Woodward was again elected to the House of Representatives in 1934, and she served six terms representing Bolton. She was not a candidate for reelection in 1946 and was succeeded by Ralph Q. Broll.

From 1928 to 1945, Woodward served as Bolton's town treasurer. From 1922 to 1935, she was registrar of voters.

=== Political positions and legislation ===
Woodward opposed women's suffrage. In a 1928 interview, she said that she often found herself in the minority among fellow women legislators, as many of them were suffragists, and that she "would be glad to see the men take back the franchise". She remarked that while she thought children and the home should be women's priorities, she chose to become a legislator regardless, saying "since the vote has been forced on women, I believe we must do our duty as citizens, both by voting and by holding public office."

During Woodward's first term in the House, she authored a bill to ban fishing in a reservoir in Bolton that provided hydropower to Willimantic. The bill was successfully passed into law.

== Death ==
Woodward died on March 4, 1965, at age 79.
