= Maud Aiken =

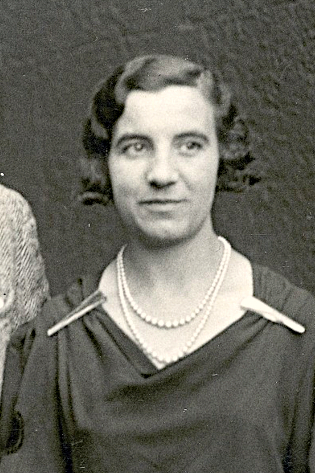
- Aiken in 1934

Background information
- Birth name: Mary Davin
- Born: 13 August 1898; Dublin, Ireland
- Died: 10 July 1978 (aged 79)
- Occupation(s): Musician, professor
- Instrument: Violin

Maud Aiken ARAM (13 August 1898 – 10 July 1978) was an Irish musician and director of the Municipal School of Music, Dublin (later part of Dublin Institute of Technology).

== Early life and education ==
Maud Aiken was born Mary Davin on 13 August 1898 in Dublin. She was the youngest of two daughters of grocer and alderman John J. Davin and Mary Davin (née O'Gara). She entered the Royal Irish Academy of Music in 1914, and was awarded the Coulson scholarship in the same year. In 1915 she received the Coulson academy scholarship, and the Vandeleur academy scholarship for violin in 1916. From 1917 to 1922 she studied in Royal Academy of Music, London, becoming the sub-professor of violin in 1920. During this time she also won a number of medals, graduated LRAM in 1921 and was elected ARAM in 1931 having been appointed the Academy's honorary local representative in Dublin.

== Career ==
Aiken studied at the London Academy of Music and Dramatic Art, winning four gold medals, leading the orchestra under Sir Alexander Mackenzie, and at the Conservatoire de Paris. She played the viola as an early member of the 2RN orchestra. In 1930 she was appointed the director of the Municipal School of Music, Dublin, holding this office until her marriage to Frank Aiken in 1934. During her time as director she was credited for her organisational skill, and oversaw an expansion of the curriculum and an increased appreciation of Irish music. She became a member of the board of governors of the Royal Irish Academy of Music in 1939 in her capacity as a representative of Dublin corporation. From 1950 to 1978 she was the vice-president of the Academy, being awarded a fellowship in 1961. Aiken sat as chair of the board for 20 years, encouraging broadening of Academy activities, promoting high standards, presiding over an increase in student numbers, and improvement in finances. In 1972 an Academy junior piano scholarship was renamed "the Maud Aiken exhibition". Aiken sat as the vice-president of the Feis Ceoil Association from 1963-1967 and then the president from 1971-1978. She also sat on the Wexford Festival Opera council. Aiken was conferred with the Order of Merit of the Federal Republic of Germany in 1971.

== Death ==
Aiken died on 10 July 1978 in a car crash, and was buried in Glasnevin Cemetery, Dublin. She was survived by her husband, one daughter, Aedamar, and two sons, Proinnsias, and Lochlann.
