= HMS Matilda =

Two vessels have served the British Royal Navy under the name Matilda:

- HMS Matilda (1794) was the French corvette Jacobine (or Jacobin) launched in 1793 that the Royal Navy captured in 1794 took into service as Matilda. She captured seven privateers in the West Indies before being converted to a hospital ship in 1799, and being broken up in 1810.
- HMS Matilda (1805) was the French privateer Matilde that HMS Cambrian captured in 1805 and that participated in the action in 1805 in St Marys River. She may have never been commissioned and was last listed in 1805.
