= Albert Luykx =

Flemish businessman

- Born: Albert Luykx; 1917; Lommel, Belgium
- Died: 1978 (aged 60/61); Dublin, Ireland
- Known for: Arms Crisis/Arms Trial
- Spouse: Maria Luykx
- Children: 1

Albert Antoine Luykx (born 1917, Lommel, died 1978, Dublin) was a Flemish businessman, living in Ireland, who was involved in the 1970 Arms Crisis.

Luykx was a member of the SS during World War II. After the war, he was convicted and sentenced to death. The sentence was later commuted to twenty years imprisonment. In 1948 he escaped to Ireland under the alias "Francis J. Faes" in October 1948.

An acquaintance of Neil Blaney, he was approached by Captain James Kelly, and asked to help in acquiring arms in Germany with the intention of arming the Irish Republican Army. Luykx was subsequently tried, together with Kelly and Charles Haughey. He claimed that the operation was sanctioned by the Minister for Defence, Jim Gibbons. All four were acquitted. Journalist Vincent Browne, writing of the Arms Crisis in July 2003, said "the gravest injustice was done to Albert Luykx...who never had reason to believe that in lending money to the operation and giving otherwise of his services, he was not acting on behalf of the Irish state".
