= Exercise Armageddon =

Military exercise

Exercise Armageddon was a highly sensitive military exercise and contingency plan drafted by the Republic of Ireland in 1970. The primary aim of the exercise was "to study, plan for and rehearse in detail the intervention of the Defence Forces in Northern Ireland in order to secure the safety of the minority population".

Created against the backdrop of escalating sectarian violence at the onset of the Troubles, the plan was designed to address scenarios where the nationalist and Catholic minority in Northern Ireland faced imminent ethnic cleansing. It represented the first formal effort by the Republic to systematically evaluate the logistical, tactical, and strategic realities of crossing the border into British territory for military operations.

== Background ==
The Northern Ireland Civil Rights Association organised protest marches from 1968 seeking to improve conditions for Roman Catholics in Northern Ireland. This had led to counter-protests and then sectarian riots, leading to 1,500 Catholic refugees fleeing to the Republic of Ireland. On 13 August 1969 the Taoiseach, Jack Lynch said in a television interview: "…the Irish government can no longer stand by and see innocent people injured and perhaps worse". His cabinet was divided over what to do, with Kevin Boland and Neil Blaney calling for robust action. On 30 August Lynch ordered the Irish Army Chief of Staff, General Seán Mac Eoin, to prepare a plan for possible incursions.

The then Northern Irish junior home affairs minister John Taylor recalled that Lynch's comment about no longer standing by resulted in Taylor mobilising 8,000 police reservists "to repel a possible invasion".

While the riots continued, the introduction of British Army troops in the Falls area of Belfast, and around the Bogside part of Derry from mid-August under Operation Banner protected Catholic areas from further mass loyalist attacks.

== Interim Report of Planning Board on Northern Ireland Operations ==
In September 1969, an Irish Army document was drawn up called, Interim Report of Planning Board on Northern Ireland Operations. It outlined their concept for feasible military operations within Northern Ireland. The army's planners accepted that it had "no capability to engage successfully in conventional, offensive military operations against the security forces in Northern Ireland" to protect the Catholic minority from loyalist mobs.

The plan called for units of specially trained and equipped Irish commandos to infiltrate Northern Ireland and launch guerrilla-style operations against the Belfast docks, Aldergrove airport, the BBC studios, and key industries. The campaign would start in Belfast and the northwest, so as to draw the bulk of security forces in Northern Ireland away from the border areas, and turn their attention to the guerrilla campaign. The Irish Army would then invade with four brigades operating in company-strength units to occupy the Catholic-majority towns of Derry and Newry, and contain any remaining security forces in those areas. The Irish Army Transport Corps did not have enough resources to transport all of the necessary forces to the conflict zone, and the plan suggested hiring buses from CIÉ. For political reasons, the Republic would not formally declare war when the operation started.

The operation would leave the Republic of Ireland exposed to "retaliatory punitive military action by United Kingdom forces". The plan included a warning that: "The Defence Forces have no capability of embarking on unilateral military operation [sic] of any kind … therefore any operations undertaken against Northern Ireland would be militarily unsound."

== Critique ==
The 2009 documentary, If Lynch Had Invaded, interviewed a number of academics, former civil servants, and Irish Army officers, and they put forward a number of theories:

- The plan to occupy Newry would not save any Catholic refugees, as it was a predominantly Catholic town with no inter-sectarian riots.
- The Catholic parts of Derry had suffered assaults from the Royal Ulster Constabulary and Protestant mobs, but was effectively ring-fenced on the introduction of British troops in August; as of October 1969, further attacks were unlikely.
- Invading the territory of a much larger and much more powerful country was too much of a risk to the security of Ireland.
- The United Kingdom could retaliate massively. The possibility of British occupation as a result of the plan was highly likely.
- The plan ignored the incompatibility of forces. The United Kingdom was a member of NATO, while the Irish Defence Forces were much smaller than the British Armed Forces, had inferior arms and transportation in comparison to British forces, and had only minimal air and naval capabilities. The Defence Forces were said to train for "World War II operations using World War I weapons", such as the Lee–Enfield rifle (most Irish soldiers were armed with calibre-equivalent FN FAL 7.62 automatic rifles). Former Irish officers such as Vincent Savino recalled that the Irish Army was "so short of the basics", having been allowed to run down since 1945 by the same politicians who now wanted it to undertake such a dangerous mission. By contrast, British forces in Northern Ireland consisted of almost 3,000 heavily armed soldiers of the Queens Regiment, the Royal Regiment of Wales, and the Prince of Wales's Own Regiment of Yorkshire. These troops had considerable experience in training and conventional large-scale combat tactics, and many had returned from guarding NATO's Northern Flank. They were equipped with Humber Pig and Saracen armored personnel carriers. Royal Air Force F-4 Phantom and Harrier jets were also stationed at airbases within short flying time from Northern Ireland. These forces would have been capable of dealing decisively with any Irish military incursion into the area. The mismatch was reflected in the choice of title. According to security analyst Tom Clonan, "irrespective of the element of surprise, the Irish Army would have been subject to a massive British counterattack – probably within hours of their initial incursion. Irish casualties would have been very high as the British would have sought to swiftly and indiscriminately end the Republic's capabilities and occupy the Republic via military intervention".
- In 1969, both the Republic and the UK were applying to join the European Economic Community. The Republic's application would likely have been jeopardised if it had invaded a "friendly neighbour".
- While the Irish government had called for United Nations involvement in Northern Ireland in August 1969, launching a localised but technical invasion, and then calling again for intervention, would have led to universal condemnation, being contrary to international law. The Republic of Ireland had joined the UN only in 1955.
- All members of NATO are bound by the North Atlantic Treaty to oppose a military incursion on a member state; this would probably force the United States and the rest of the NATO members to intervene.
- The targets for covert operations, such as the BBC offices in Belfast, were already guarded by the British Army to protect them from local rioters. None of these targets were linked to the inter-sectarian riots.
- An intrusion might have provoked new and more widespread sectarian rioting, causing hundreds of deaths.
- An invasion of Northern Ireland by the armed forces of the Republic would likely have met with the same overwhelmingly negative international response as the UK's invasion of the Suez Canal zone during the Suez Crisis in 1956.

Nevertheless, historian Diarmaid Ferriter considers that the operation would have been popular at the time, given the strong emotive feeling in the Republic about the situation in Northern Ireland.

== February Directive ==
On 6 February 1970, the defence minister, James Gibbons, ordered the army to prepare and train for a possible intervention in Northern Ireland due to the deteriorating situation there; specifically the increase in the amount and severity of rioting and the growth of loyalist extremism. The object of the intervention would have been to protect the life and property of civilians and it would have only occurred if there had already been a breakdown of law and order to such an extent that the Irish Army's actions could not have caused further destabilisation. In September 1970, Colonel Michael Hefferon, the former director of army intelligence, told the Arms Crisis trial that the directive instructed the army to set aside surplus arms, ammunition and gas masks for a possible operation, which could have involved the army making 'incursions' into Northern Ireland and distributing arms to the civilian population.

== Arms Crisis ==
Subsequently some more actively nationalist Irish government ministers were tried in 1970 in the Arms Crisis trial, where the defendants included an Irish Army officer. It emerged that a secret Irish government fund of £100,000 had been dedicated to helping the refugees, but most of it had been spent covertly on buying arms for nationalist paramilitary groups in the North. Ministers Charles Haughey and Neil Blaney were sacked from their posts.

== Sources ==
- The army's 1969 memo was declassified in 2004 according to the documentary, but according to an article in the Irish Independent, at least the handwritten version was released in 2001.

== See also ==
- Flagstaff Hill incident
- Ireland–United Kingdom relations
