= Charles Haughey =

Taoiseach (1979–1981, 1982, 1987–1992)

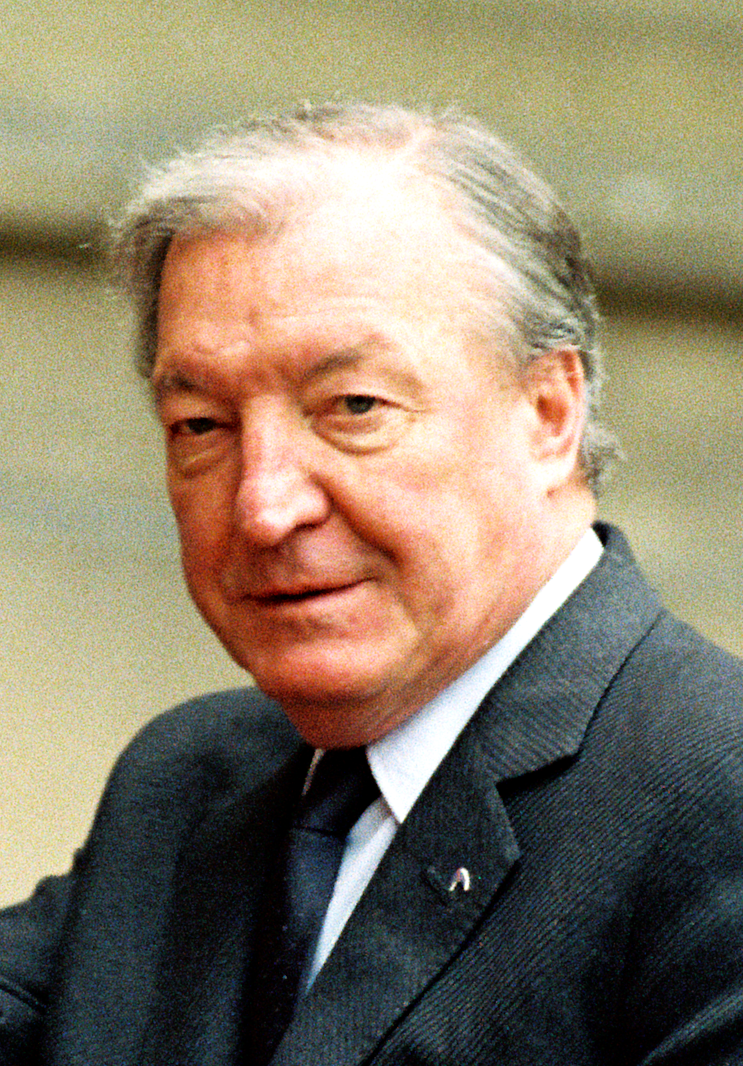
- Haughey in 1989

Taoiseach
- In office 10 March 1987 – 11 February 1992
- President: Patrick Hillery; Mary Robinson
- Tánaiste: Brian Lenihan Snr; John Wilson
- Preceded by: Garret FitzGerald
- Succeeded by: Albert Reynolds
- In office 9 March 1982 – 14 December 1982
- President: Patrick Hillery
- Tánaiste: Ray MacSharry
- Preceded by: Garret FitzGerald
- Succeeded by: Garret FitzGerald
- In office 11 December 1979 – 30 June 1981
- President: Patrick Hillery
- Tánaiste: George Colley
- Preceded by: Jack Lynch
- Succeeded by: Garret FitzGerald

Leader of the Opposition
- In office 14 December 1982 – 10 March 1987
- Taoiseach: Garret FitzGerald
- Preceded by: Garret FitzGerald
- Succeeded by: Alan Dukes
- In office 30 June 1981 – 9 March 1982
- Taoiseach: Garret FitzGerald
- Preceded by: Garret FitzGerald
- Succeeded by: Garret FitzGerald

Leader of Fianna Fáil
- In office 7 December 1979 – 6 February 1992
- Deputy: George Colley; Ray MacSharry; Brian Lenihan Snr; John Wilson
- Preceded by: Jack Lynch
- Succeeded by: Albert Reynolds
Other political offices
Minister for the Gaeltacht
In office 10 March 1987 – 11 February 1992
Taoiseach	Himself
Preceded by	Paddy O'Toole
Succeeded by	John Wilson
Minister for Social Welfare
In office 5 July 1977 – 12 December 1979
Taoiseach	Jack Lynch
Preceded by	Brendan Corish
Succeeded by	Michael Woods
Minister for Health
In office 5 July 1977 – 11 December 1979
Taoiseach	Jack Lynch
Preceded by	Brendan Corish
Succeeded by	Michael Woods
Minister for Finance
In office 10 November 1966 – 7 May 1970
Taoiseach	Jack Lynch
Preceded by	Jack Lynch
Succeeded by	George Colley
Minister for Agriculture
In office 8 October 1964 – 10 November 1966
Taoiseach	Seán Lemass
Preceded by	Paddy Smith
Succeeded by	Neil Blaney (Agriculture & Fisheries)
Minister for Justice
In office 11 October 1961 – 8 October 1964
Taoiseach	Seán Lemass
Preceded by	Oscar Traynor
Succeeded by	Brian Lenihan Snr
Parliamentary Secretary
1959–1961	Justice
Teachta Dála
In office June 1981 – November 1992
Constituency	Dublin North-Central
In office June 1977 – June 1981
Constituency	Dublin Artane
In office March 1957 – June 1977
Constituency	Dublin North-East
Dublin City Councillor
In office 1953–1955
Constituency	Dublin No. 1

Personal details
- Born: 16 September 1925 Castlebar, County Mayo, Ireland
- Died: 13 June 2006 (aged 80) Kinsealy, Dublin, Ireland
- Resting place: St. Fintan's Cemetery, Sutton, Dublin
- Party: Fianna Fáil
- Spouse: Maureen Lemass (m. 1951)
- Children: 4, including Seán
- Relatives: Pádraig "Jock" Haughey (brother); Seán Lemass (father-in-law); Kathleen Lemass (mother-in-law); Noel Lemass (brother-in-law); Monica McWilliams (cousin); Siobhán Haughey (grandniece)
- Education: University College Dublin; King's Inns
- Profession: Chartered accountant; Barrister (non-practicing)
- Website: Official website
- Military service
- Allegiance: Ireland
- Service: Local Defence Force; Fórsa Cosanta Áitiúil
- Service years: 1941–1957
- Rank: Lieutenant
- Conflicts: The Emergency

Charles James Haughey (Note: Pronounced: /ˈhɔːhi/; HAW-hee. In the Irish language, Haughey is sometimes known as Cathal Ó hEochaidh.) (16 September 1925 – 13 June 2006) was an Irish politician who served as Taoiseach three times between 1979 and 1992, when he was leader of Fianna Fáil. Over a forty-year career, Haughey was the most complex and divisive figure in late 20th-century Ireland. After his retirement, the disclosure that he had received millions of pounds in secret payments from businessmen damaged his reputation.

From a working-class Dublin family with roots in Ulster, Haughey entered politics in the 1950s. He was first appointed to the cabinet by his father-in-law, Seán Lemass. A dynamic and reforming figure, he was made Minister for Finance by Jack Lynch in 1966. During the Arms Crisis in 1970 he was sacked from the government when it emerged that he had purchased weapons for nationalist groups in Northern Ireland during the early months of The Troubles; he was acquitted of criminal charges. After a period on the backbenches, he returned to the cabinet in 1977 as Minister for Health and Social Welfare. Following Jack Lynch's retirement, Haughey was narrowly and unexpectedly elected leader of Fianna Fáil in 1979, defeating George Colley, a childhood friend.

Haughey's first term as Taoiseach, from 1979 to 1981, was dominated by economic turmoil and the IRA hunger strike. After losing the 1981 election to a coalition led by Garret FitzGerald, Fianna Fáil spent eight months in opposition before returning to power. Haughey's short-lived 1982 government was marked by scandals involving the phone tapping of journalists and the discovery of a wanted murderer at the home of his attorney general. In 1982 and 1983, Haughey's leadership was unsuccessfully challenged by opponents in his party three times.

In the mid-1980s, Haughey spent four years in opposition to FitzGerald; during this time he campaigned against the Anglo-Irish Agreement, and a group of his opponents in Fianna Fáil left to form the Progressive Democrats. He was re-elected Taoiseach in 1987. During his final years in office his governments pursued aggressive deficit-cutting measures, regenerated parts of Dublin, and supported German reunification. He engaged in secret peace talks with the Provisional IRA. In 1989, he led Fianna Fáil into a coalition government for the first time in its history. By 1991, Haughey had again developed significant opposition in his party, including from former allies. Following a fourth unsuccessful effort to remove him as leader, he resigned in January 1992 over historic allegations of phone tapping and was succeeded by Albert Reynolds.

In 1997, the McCracken Tribunal unearthed evidence that Haughey had received payments from businessmen and used offshore accounts to evade tax. The Moriarty Tribunal subsequently found that he had misappropriated Fianna Fáil funds, and it estimated the scale of the payments he received at more than £9 million. His legacy remains contentious: his 1960s reforms and economic achievements in the 1990s are set against authoritarian methods, bitter political divisions, and a lavish lifestyle funded by payments deemed by the tribunals to have been corrupt.

== Early life and family ==
Charles James Haughey (Note: alternatively Cathal James Haughey) was born on 16 September 1925 in Castlebar, County Mayo, to Johnnie Haughey (Note: Johnnie Haughey was also known as Seán Haughey.) (1897–1947) and Sarah McWilliams (1901–1989). He was the third of seven children. (Note: The other six children were Pádraig, Seán, Eoghan, Bridget, Maureen and Eithne. Haughey's elder brother Seán was the grandfather of the Hong Kong Olympic swimmer Siobhán Haughey.) His parents were both Irish republicans and natives of Swatragh, County Londonderry. Johnnie Haughey had fought in Ulster during the Irish War of Independence and supported the pro-Treaty side in the subsequent civil war; a portrait of Michael Collins hung in the family home during Charles's childhood.

Through his mother, Haughey was a first cousin of the Northern Ireland human rights campaigner and academic Monica McWilliams.

After marrying in 1922, Haughey's parents had moved to what would become the Irish Free State so Johnnie could enlist in the National Army. He was serving at Castlebar Military Barracks at the time of Charles's birth. Johnnie retired from the army in 1928 due to worsening health, having attained the rank of commandant. The family moved to Dunshaughlin, County Meath, where he attempted a career as a farmer. His health continued to decline, and he was diagnosed with multiple sclerosis in 1933. The family then moved to Donnycarney, a working-class suburb on the northside of Dublin, where Sarah Haughey struggled to raise her children while supporting a husband who was now too infirm to work.

As a child, Charles Haughey was known as Cathal. In 1938, he placed first out of five hundred pupils in the Dublin Corporation scholarship examination, allowing him to go to secondary school at St Joseph's in Fairview. At "Joey's" he befriended Harry Boland and George Colley, members of prominent Fianna Fáil families. Haughey joined the Local Defence Force on his sixteenth birthday and continued to be a reservist until his election to the Dáil. He was a Gaelic footballer for Parnells GAA and won a Dublin senior championship medal in 1945. (Note: In the final, Parnells defeated Civil Service, whose star player, the future Taoiseach Jack Lynch, was absent due to injury. Haughey also played hurling; in 1943, he was a member of the Dublin minor team who played a Leinster final against Kilkenny – postponed from the previous year due to the Emergency – which they lost by 3–10 to 0–4. On the same day, the All-Ireland senior hurling final between Cork and Antrim was also played at Croke Park; Jack Lynch was on the victorious Cork team.)

On completing secondary school in 1943, Haughey studied commerce at University College Dublin (UCD). He was a contemporary of his future political rival Garret FitzGerald, but they ran in different circles. On VE-Day in 1945, Haughey and other UCD students burnt the Union Flag outside Trinity College in response to perceived disrespect afforded the Irish tricolour, precipitating a small riot. Later in life, Haughey said it was an incident he had been "dining out on – suitably embellished, of course". At UCD, Haughey met Maureen Lemass, daughter of the Fianna Fáil minister Seán Lemass, and they began a romantic relationship. He graduated with first-class honours in 1946.

Haughey's political views were influenced by childhood summers spent in Northern Ireland, including sectarian riots in Maghera he had witnessed in 1935. He described himself as an "accidental" member of Fianna Fáil, motivated by his friendship with Boland and Colley and conversations with Seán Lemass. He joined in 1948, the year after his father's death; it is likely that Johnnie Haughey's disapproval prevented him from doing so earlier. Haughey's family connection to the pro-Treaty side of the civil war aroused suspicion in the party; Kevin Boland, Harry's brother, once described him as "that bloody little Blueshirt".

Haughey was called to the bar in 1949, though he never practiced. He qualified as a chartered accountant in 1950, and soon after set up an accountancy firm with Harry Boland. Boland's political connections and Haughey's business acumen made Haughey–Boland a success, and the firm won a number of government contracts. In 1951, Haughey married Maureen Lemass, and they moved to a middle-class home in the north Dublin suburb of Raheny. They had four children.

== Early political career (1951–1979) ==
Haughey stood unsuccessfully as a Fianna Fáil candidate in Dublin North-East at the 1951 and 1954 general elections, alongside senior politicians Oscar Traynor and Harry Colley, father of George. He was co-opted to Dublin Corporation in 1953 but lost his seat at the subsequent election. Though he also lost the 1956 Dáil by-election in Dublin North-East triggered by the death of Alfie Byrne, it raised his profile and helped him win a seat at the general election the following year. His success resulted in the defeat of Harry Colley, who never stood for the Dáil again. The incident created friction between Haughey and George Colley.

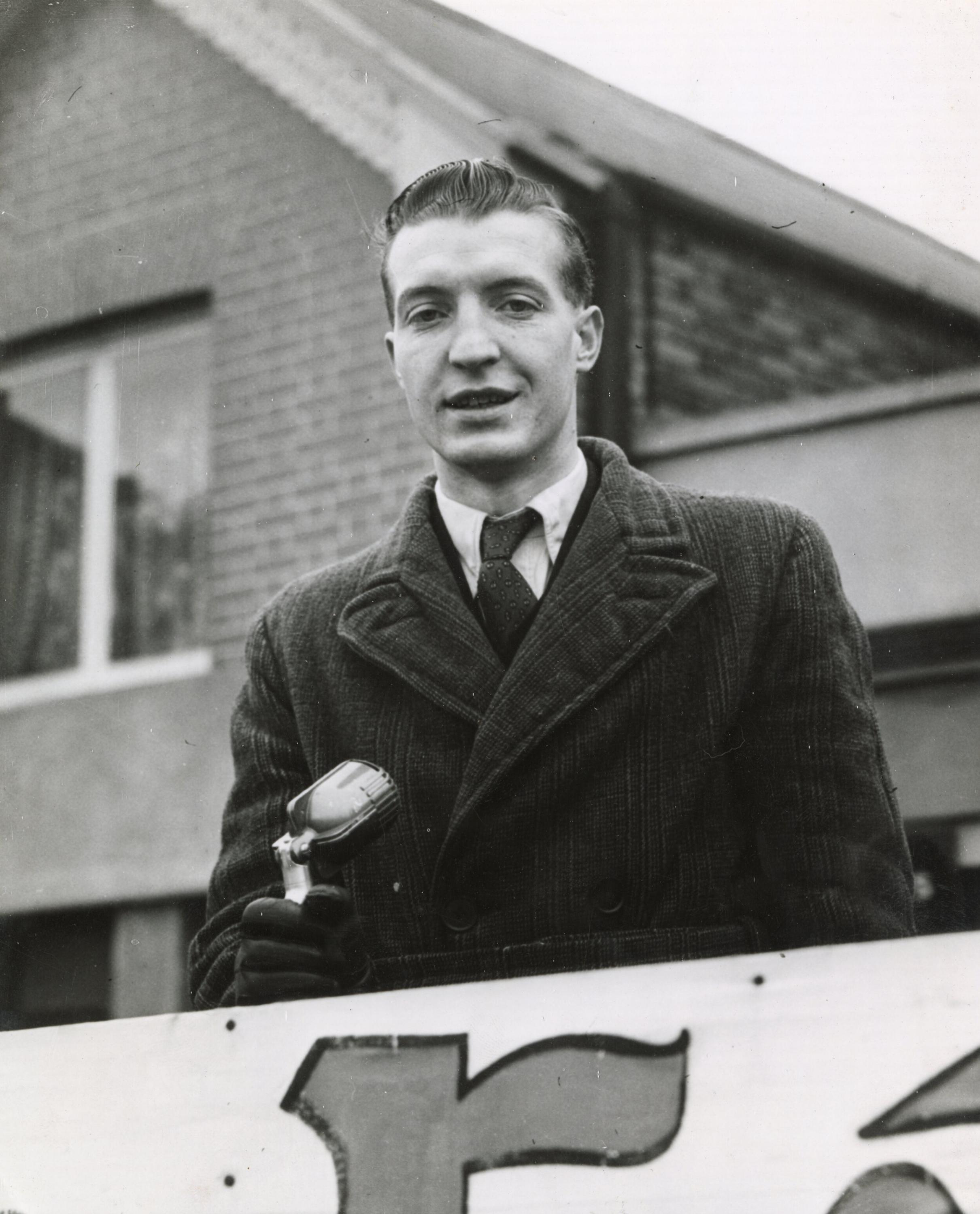
Haughey speaking on the campaign trail during a by-election in 1947

Shortly after his election to the Dáil, Haughey bought a large house with 45 acres of land at Grangemore in Raheny. Given Haughey–Boland's modest profits and a TD's salary of £1,500 (about €51,000 in 2025), it was unclear how he could afford it. Decades later, Patrick Gallagher said that his father, Matt Gallagher, a property developer, had tipped Haughey off that the land would increase in value due to rezoning, and secured a commitment from Haughey to sell the land to him in the future. The Gallagher Group's accounts were managed by Des Traynor, an apprentice accountant articled to Haughey at his firm, who had also become responsible for Haughey's financial affairs. (Note: Des Traynor and Oscar Traynor were not related.)

In 1959, Séan Lemass became Taoiseach, and seven months later, Haughey was offered his first government post, as Parliamentary Secretary to the Minister for Justice under his constituency colleague, Oscar Traynor. Lemass was reputed to have said to Haughey: "As Taoiseach, it is my duty to offer you the post of parliamentary secretary, and as your father-in-law I am advising you not to take it." Some interpreted the comment as a sign Lemass did not want to appoint Haughey, but it may have been made in jest, a reference to Haughey's reduction in future earnings from taking up politics full-time. Haughey left his accountancy firm after entering government. Traynor was in his seventies and suffering from hypertension, and Haughey came to outshine him at departmental level.

Haughey came to epitomise a new type of politician, the "men in the mohair suits", known for their smart clothes, swagger, and busy social lives. He regularly dined and drank with young colleagues like Donogh O'Malley and Brian Lenihan. In 1960, he bought his first racehorse. Like Lemass, Haughey was a moderniser within Fianna Fáil; he described himself as a progressive rather than a conservative. At the 1961 election, Oscar Traynor retired from politics, and Haughey had a safe seat in the north-eastern suburbs of Dublin for the rest of his career.

=== Minister for Justice (1961–1964) ===
Haughey was promoted after the 1961 election, becoming Minister for Justice, a role in which he was seen as a reformer. He reintroduced the Special Criminal Court to inhibit the IRA's Border Campaign. He widened the availability of free legal aid for criminal cases, and abolished the death penalty for all but a handful of offences. Haughey placed extraditions to Britain, previously dealt with informally, on a legal footing. When a group of members of the Garda Síochána went on a go-slow in 1961 because of pay and conditions, Haughey reinstated the leading protestors following their dismissal and sought to redress their grievances. Perhaps the best-known legislation of his tenure was the Succession Act of 1965 – enacted under his successor, Brian Lenihan – which prohibited men from denying wives and children their inheritance rights.

=== Minister for Agriculture (1964–1966) ===
Following the resignation of Paddy Smith as Minister for Agriculture in 1964, Haughey was appointed in his place. (Note: Smith had resigned in protest at what he saw as the Lemass government's neglect of rural Ireland and excessive support for the trade unions. It was the first time a Fianna Fáil minister had resigned over a policy dispute.) He was the first politician from Dublin to serve in the role. Haughey came into conflict with the National Farmers Association (NFA) and the Irish Creamery Milk Suppliers Association (ICMSA) over milk prices. In April 1966, twenty-eight ICMSA picketers were arrested outside Leinster House under the Offences Against the State Act, a law originally intended for use against the IRA. 158 more were arrested under the subsequent two days, before Haughey conceded. Later that year, the NFA led a farmers' protest which culminated in a twenty-one day encampment outside the Department of Agriculture. Although the NFA was dominated by large farmers who tended to vote for Fine Gael, the protest elicited broad sympathy from an urban public who retained folk memories of the land.

==== 1966 Fianna Fáil leadership election ====
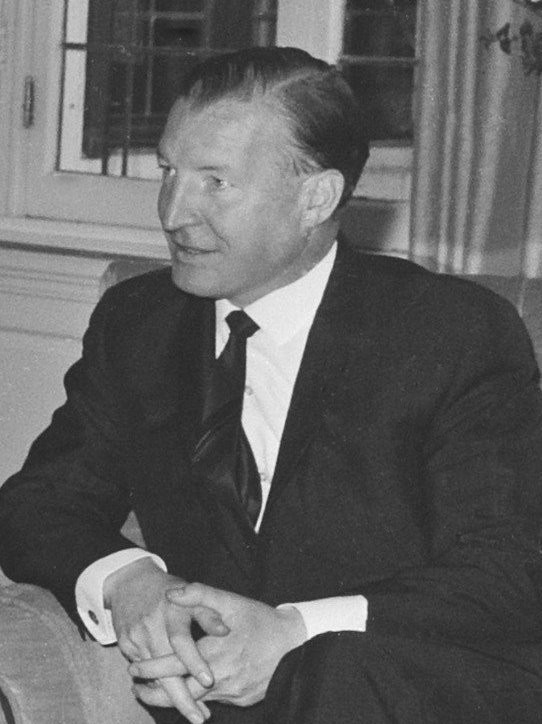
Haughey in 1967

In October 1966, Seán Lemass announced his retirement. Haughey and George Colley, now a minister and a TD in Haughey's constituency, both declared their candidacies for the leadership. Donegal-based cabinet member Neil Blaney also stood, and there was fear in Fianna Fáil that with two Dublin politicians competing, Blaney, regarded as a volatile, single-issue anti-partition candidate, could emerge as the winner. Jack Lynch, the Minister for Finance, was persuaded to stand as a compromise candidate. Haughey and Blaney withdrew, and Lynch defeated Colley comfortably among the parliamentary party. Lynch was seen by his critics as a reluctant leader who could be removed later if necessary.

=== Minister for Finance (1966–1970) ===
Once elected Taoiseach, Jack Lynch appointed Haughey as Minister for Finance. He was popular and admired in this role, and seen as the driving force in Lynch's government amid a general sense of drift. He introduced subsidised electricity and free TV licences for older people, along with special tax concessions for the disabled. The introduction of free travel on public transport for pensioners became an important part of Haughey's political image for the rest of his career. The tax exemption for artists he created was praised by a wide range of figures, including Todd Andrews and Seán Ó Faoláin. Haughey introduced subsidies for the horse-breeding industry, making Ireland a leader in that field.

Haughey helped set up an organisation, Taca, which was responsible for fundraising on behalf of Fianna Fáil. (Note: Taca is the Irish word for "support".) It encouraged businessmen to pay for membership in exchange for access to ministers at social events. George Colley, now a firm political opponent of Haughey, emerged as the leader of the traditional wing of the party. A 1967 comment by Colley, that Fianna Fáil's young members should not be discouraged "if some people in high places appear to have low standards" was widely believed to refer to Haughey. In 1968, Jack Lynch moved to restrict Taca and ended its practice of dinners with businessmen.

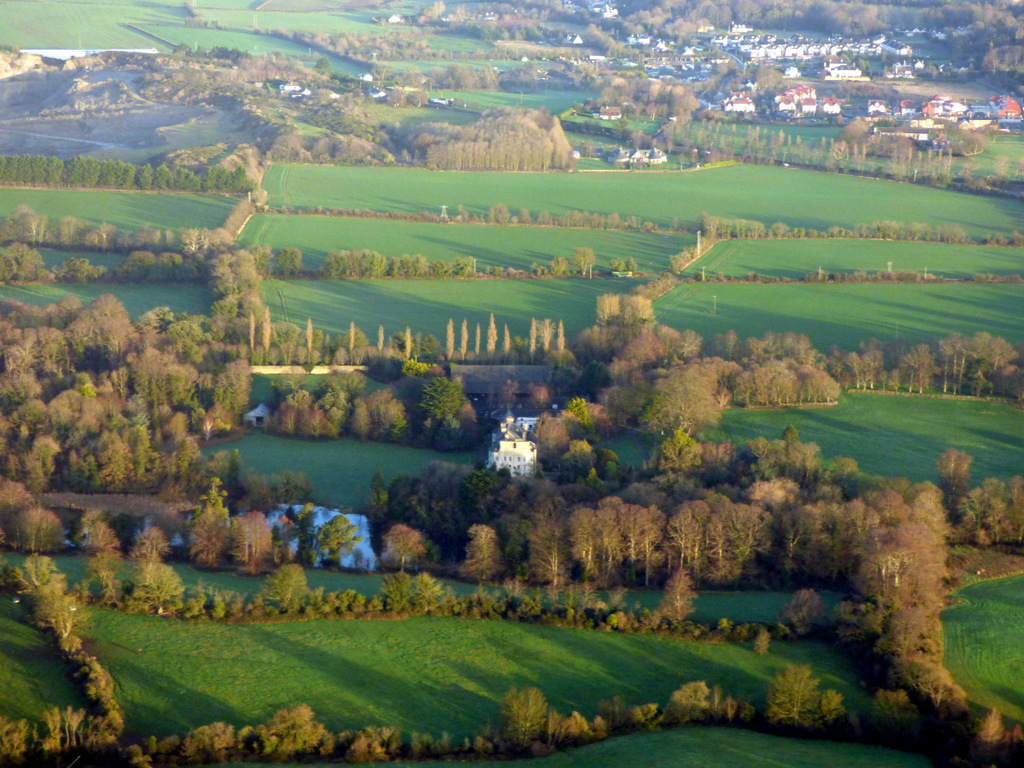
Haughey's former estate at Kinsealy from the air in 2019. Abbeville is the white building in the centre of the picture.

In 1967, Haughey bought a horse stud at Ashbourne, County Meath. He sold his family home at Grangemore to the Gallagher Group in 1969 for £204,000 (about €4.5 million in 2025), a large profit on what he had paid for it. With the proceeds, he bought Abbeville, an 18th-century mansion and estate at Kinsealy (Note: In correspondence, Haughey always referred to it as Kinsaley.) in north County Dublin. Haughey's avoidance of tax on the sale of Grangemore as a result of his own policies was criticised by Conor Cruise O'Brien, a constituency rival, though an Irish Times editorial said O'Brien was engaging in "the politics of envy". The historian R.F. Foster later wrote of Haughey's lifestyle: "A love of horses and an addiction to breeding them is a congenitally Irish characteristic and not (as in England) generally defined by class; but Haughey took it to the Ascendancy limit, even commissioning a series of portraits of himself on horseback in full hunting fig by the gifted painter Edward McGuire."

==== Arms Crisis and criminal trial (1970) ====
The widespread outbreak of violence in Northern Ireland in August 1969 exposed the gap between Fianna Fáil's rhetoric on partition and reality. It also had a radicalising effect on Haughey, who had generally not spoken on Northern Ireland during his time as a minister, and had been presumed to support the conciliatory approach spearheaded by Lemass in the mid-1960s. At cabinet, Haughey, Neil Blaney and Kevin Boland spoke in favour of sending the army to Derry and Newry to protect the Catholic populations, but a majority, including Jack Lynch, overruled them. A decision was made to set up field hospitals along the border and mobilise military reserves, but even this created an atmosphere of near-hysteria over the possibility of military intervention.

A Northern Ireland subcommittee of the cabinet was established, made up of Haughey, Blaney, Pádraig Faulkner and Joseph Brennan. Quickly, Haughey and Blaney proceeded to conduct their own Northern Ireland policy. As Minister for Finance, Haughey was responsible for distributing a £100,000 fund intended to help Catholics in the North; about half of it was used to buy guns. (Note: There had been requests from political leaders of the Catholic community in Northern Ireland for weapons to be given to them for protection. Stormont MPs Paddy Devlin, Paddy Kennedy, and Paddy O'Hanlon had visited Dublin in August 1969 to make such a demand. There is evidence too that Gerry Fitt requested the delivery of arms.) Army captain James Kelly, who believed he was acting with government approval, became an intermediary between Haughey and the nascent Provisional IRA. Meanwhile, in September 1969 Jack Lynch gave a speech setting out Fianna Fáil's position that a united Ireland could only occur by the consent of the majority in Northern Ireland.

Micheál Ó Móráin, the Minister for Justice, had been told of meetings between government figures and the IRA, but he was unwell and did not act on the reports. It was said that Charles Haughey's brother, Jock, was involved in importing arms. In early 1970, Blaney asked Albert Luykx, a Flemish businessman, to assist with the import of weapons from Europe; Haughey, as Minister for Finance, was responsible for Irish customs arrangements. The Garda Special Branch learned of the plan, and informed Peter Berry, the senior civil servant at the Department of Justice. On speaking to Berry on 13 April, Jack Lynch was reluctant to intervene, but after Berry told President Éamon de Valera, the Taoiseach realised the story was bound to become public. On the morning of 22 April, the day he was due to deliver the budget, Haughey suffered a fractured skull after falling from a horse. He was absent from government meetings for weeks afterwards. (Note: There were persistent rumours that Haughey had sustained his injuries after being beaten with an iron bar after an altercation in a pub. A 2014 book falsely attributed the claim to T. K. Whitaker. There is no evidence to substantiate the rumour, however, and early-morning horse rides were part of Haughey's routine during this period.) Jack Lynch visited Haughey in hospital and asked him to resign from the government, but he refused. Haughey told his wife that he expected to be sacked after being discharged.

On 1 May, Lynch informed the cabinet of an alleged plot involving Haughey and Blaney. Four days later, Micheál Ó Móráin, who had also been in hospital, resigned as Minister for Justice under pressure from Lynch. By now, Fine Gael leader Liam Cosgrave had also learned of events from the Special Branch. At 2:00 a.m. on 6 May, Lynch announced the sacking of Haughey and Blaney from the government. Kevin Boland resigned in protest later that day. On 8 May, the Dáil met to discuss the appointments of replacement ministers; the debate lasted more than thirty-six hours, concluding at 11:00 p.m. the following day, a Saturday. The ministers were appointed, and Haughey, Blaney and Boland voted with the government.

In late May, Kelly, Luykx, Blaney and Haughey were all arrested. The charges against Blaney were dropped, but the other three men (Note: Along with John Kelly, a Belfast-based IRA member.) proceeded to the Central Criminal Court, where they were tried for conspiracy to import guns and ammunition. The first trial collapsed after six days due to allegations of bias against the prosecution counsel. The second lasted fourteen days and hinged on whether Jim Gibbons, the Minister for Defence, had known of the imports, giving them the implied imprimatur of government. Haughey and Gibbons provided contradictory stories. Nevertheless, it became clear that Gibbons did know about the activities, even if he did not approve of them, and on 23 October, the defendants were all acquitted. (Note: The extent of the government's prior knowledge of Haughey and Blaney's activities has been the subject of much discussion. Peter Berry said that Jack Lynch had been aware of arms imports since October 1969, and there is little evidence to contradict this, though Berry had been in hospital at the time he says he told Lynch and it is possible his communication was impaired. In 2015, Conor Lenihan, the son of one of Lynch's ministers, wrote that his father had told him that Haughey and Blaney were scapegoats for a government-led conspiracy. A 2020 book, based on released archive material, raised questions about the truthfulness of Lynch and Gibbons's public statements, and said that Lynch had "a hidden policy on Northern Ireland... more interventionist and militarily focused".)

Outside the court after the verdict, Haughey implied he would challenge Lynch's leadership of Fianna Fáil. Lynch's support rallied quickly, and it was clear Haughey did not have the numbers to remove him. A Dáil motion of no-confidence in Jim Gibbons led to the government tabling a motion of confidence in itself, forcing the rebels to show their hand. Boland resigned his seat rather than vote confidence. Haughey, now a backbencher, voted with Lynch and the government.

Though Haughey never spoke about his trial or its circumstances after 1970, even to his family, it gave him a reputation as a committed republican which proved useful later in his career. It also made him an enduring hate figure among unionists. Robin Haydon, the former British ambassador to Ireland, later said that Haughey had an "inferiority complex" stemming from the Arms Crisis which coloured his subsequent dealings with the British government as Taoiseach.

=== Backbench and opposition (1970–1977) ===
Kevin Boland attempted a grassroots revolt at the 1971 Fianna Fáil ard fheis, but was not successful, and soon after left the party. Haughey, by contrast, sought to project loyalty and reconciliation, appearing on stage for Jack Lynch's speech and shaking hands with him and Jim Gibbons. He decided to stay in the party and attempt to rehabilitate himself from within. Haughey embarked on what became known as the "rubber chicken circuit", going to party meetings around the country. His speeches were always uncontroversial and he did not criticise the leadership. He engaged in fundraising for the Central Remedial Clinic in an attempt to improve his image. In 1972, Haughey began a long-term love affair with the gossip columnist Terry Keane, the wife of a senior judge, and in 1974, he bought Inishvickillane, one of the Blasket Islands off the coast of County Kerry, for £25,000 (about €430,000 in 2025).

Frank Aiken demanded that Haughey be barred from standing as a Fianna Fáil candidate at the 1973 general election, and retired from politics when this was refused. Aiken was so disillusioned that he never again attended a party event. Although the Arms Crisis had strengthened Lynch in Fianna Fáil, it had also led its two main opponents to form an alliance. The National Coalition of Fine Gael and Labour won the election, and Fianna Fáil found itself out of power for the first time in sixteen years. Amid a general sense of exhaustion in the party, Haughey worked hard in opposition to maintain his profile. Lynch believed that returning Haughey to the frontbench would unify the party and satisfy the grassroots, and in January 1975, Haughey was made the Fianna Fáil spokesperson on health. Jim Gibbons assented to the appointment but said Haughey would destroy the party. Lynch assured journalists that Haughey was now fully subscribed to the party's position on Northern Ireland.

Fianna Fáil entered the 1977 general election with a detailed slate of promises to cut tax and increase spending. According to Frank Dunlop, Haughey's reaction to the manifesto was to mutter "oh dear, oh dear", but, accompanied by the most professional campaign yet seen in Irish politics, it returned the party to power with a record majority of twenty.

=== Minister for Health and Social Welfare (1977–1979) ===
Haughey was appointed Minister for Health and Social Welfare by newly re-elected Taoiseach Jack Lynch. He recruited Brendan O'Donnell, who had served under him during previous ministerial tenures, as his private secretary. O'Donnell was given two missions: to humanise the health and social welfare systems, and get Haughey elected Taoiseach by cultivating the Fianna Fáil backbench assiduously. As minister, Haughey approved the construction of several new hospitals. He gave free toothbrushes to all schoolchildren and launched a high-profile anti-smoking campaign. He also increased social welfare payments, particularly for pensioners. Haughey was responsible for the introduction of the Health (Family Planning) Act 1979, which allowed a pharmacist to sell contraceptives on receipt of a medical prescription; he called the legislation "an Irish solution to an Irish problem".

By the summer of 1979, Jack Lynch appeared to be in trouble. Fianna Fáil's large majority had become a problem; many of the party's new TDs had no relationship with him, and as the economy declined following the oil crisis, personal ambitions and resentments began to emerge. In November, the party lost two by-elections in Lynch's native Cork. The Taoiseach had been in the United States when the votes took place; on his return, he was greeted by a large number of supporters at Dublin Airport, including several ministers. Haughey did not attend, though he had no intention of challenging Lynch, believing a leadership change was still months away. He was taken by surprise when Lynch announced his resignation on 5 December.

==== 1979 Fianna Fáil leadership election ====
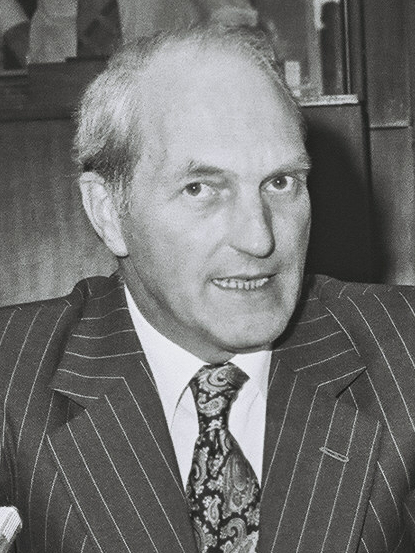
George Colley, whom Haughey had known since childhood, was his opponent in the leadership election.

While announcing his departure, Lynch said the election of his successor would take place two days later, on 7 December. The sudden and short campaign was intended by Lynch and his allies to prevent a Haughey victory. George Colley, the Tánaiste and Minister for Finance, had the support of virtually the entire cabinet. Haughey quickly announced his candidacy, and that Ray MacSharry, Colley's minister of state, would propose him. It emerged that Michael O'Kennedy, the Minister for Foreign Affairs, was supporting Haughey, a major blow to the image of unity around Colley.

Haughey won the leadership by 44 votes to 38. He told the party afterwards that he had no animosity towards his "old school pal". The Colley camp was shocked by defeat; bribery and intimidation were alleged. There were rumours that some in Fianna Fáil might not vote to elect Haughey as Taoiseach. In the Dáil, the Fine Gael leader, Garret FitzGerald, said Haughey had a "flawed pedigree". The left-wing TD Noël Browne said Haughey was a cross between Richard Nixon and António Salazar. The Labour Party leader, Frank Cluskey, said Haughey was "totally unfit" to be Taoiseach. Haughey was elected by the Dáil and appointed by President Patrick Hillery later that day. To maintain party unity, he agreed to retain Colley as Tánaiste and gave him a veto over appointments to the justice and defence portfolios.

The leadership contest left lingering bitterness. In early 1980, while speaking to Frank Cluskey outside the Dáil chamber, Fianna Fáil parliamentary party chair Billy Kenneally said of Haughey: "He's not my fucking Taoiseach, and he well knows it." The academic Declan Kiberd remarked that the moralistic tone of the criticism of Haughey in the Dáil reinforced his sense of himself as an outsider who had transcended humble origins to rise to the summit of politics.

== Taoiseach (1979–1981) ==
Haughey inherited a series of economic problems, including unemployment and spiralling public debt. On 9 January 1980, Haughey addressed the nation on television about the fiscal situation, remarking: "As a community, we are living a way beyond our means." Though Haughey had regarded some of the spending commitments in Fianna Fáil's 1977 manifesto as ludicrous, he remained an instinctive Kenyesian, and was not prepared to engage in major cutbacks. Based on her experience interviewing him in early 1980, the journalist Geraldine Kennedy said that Haughey could not solve the problems identified in his television address, because of his worldview and divisions in Fianna Fáil.

Haughey had built up his own personal financial issues during the 1970s. By the time he became Taoiseach, contrary to his public reputation as a wealthy man, he had an overdraft at Allied Irish Banks (AIB) of more than one million pounds (about €6.7 million in 2025). On the day he took office, the Gallagher Group agreed to pay off a third of Haughey's debts. It emerged in the 1990s that AIB forgave most of Haughey's remaining debts in late 1979, due to a fear the bank would lose customers if it pursued him for the money. According to an official, he had warned the bank: "I can be a very troublesome adversary."

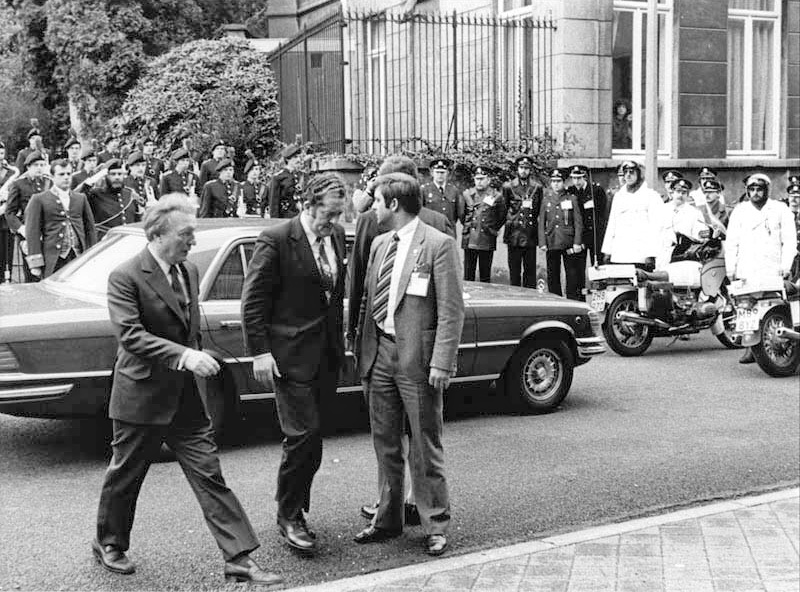
Haughey (left) and Minister for Foreign Affairs Brian Lenihan arriving at European Council meeting in Maastricht in 1981

Haughey and British prime minister Margaret Thatcher held their first bilateral meeting at 10 Downing Street on 21 May 1980. At a tête-à-tête, Haughey presented Thatcher with an Irish Georgian silver teapot and strainer, which she accepted appreciatively; but as the year went on, it became clear the two governments were at cross-purposes. In October, while the British government advanced proposals for devolved government, Haughey went on RTÉ to describe Northern Ireland as "a failed political entity". The same month, republican prisoners at HMP Maze began a hunger strike protesting the restriction of privileges for paramilitary inmates. Thatcher refused to concede to the prisoners' demands. A second Anglo-Irish summit took place at Dublin Castle in December. In exchange for commitments to deepen security co-operation, Thatcher agreed to pursue British–Irish joint studies to examine "the totality of relationships" between the two countries. The communiqué was widely seen as conferring a right on the Irish government to a role in Northern Ireland, though Thatcher vehemently rejected this interpretation, and subsequent comments by Haughey claiming vindication damaged relations between the two leaders.

A temporary end to the hunger strike in December 1980 gave Fianna Fáil a political lift, and although the economy was still weak, deficit spending cushioned the effects of the recession. Haughey remained highly popular with party grassroots; at his first ardfheis as Taoiseach, he took the stage to the strains of "A Nation Once Again". The journalist Kevin Toolis later wrote that Haughey was a master of political gestures and imagery, cultivating a powerful aura similar to Juan Perón in Argentina, in spite of his short physical stature. (Note: Haughey was 5 feet 6 inches (168 cm).) R.F. Foster said "his model of grandeur was an odd combination of Napoleonic enigma, Ascendancy hauteur, Gaelic chieftain and Tammany boss". On the recommendation of his friend Anthony Cronin, Haughey established Aosdána in 1981, furthering his reputation as a patron of the arts. Rumours about Haughey's political activities and private life were commonplace, though only some of them were true; it later emerged that some stories had been amplified by MI6.

Haughey intended to call a general election in February 1981, but the Stardust fire, in which 48 young people were killed in a nightclub in his constituency, forced him to postpone his plans. By the time Haughey could dissolve the Dáil, the hunger strike had resumed, and Bobby Sands had died. The election campaign saw Fianna Fáil squeezed from two sides: by a presidential-style Fine Gael effort built around the party's popular leader, Garret FitzGerald; and Anti H-Block Committee hunger striker candidates running on an abstentionist ticket. The atmosphere on the campaign was sulphurous, given the hostility between the two main leaders and tensions over the hunger strike. Fianna Fáil emerged from the election on 11 June with 78 seats, while Fine Gael and the Labour Party had 80 between them. Garret FitzGerald formed a minority coalition government and Fianna Fáil went into opposition.

== Leader of the Opposition (1981–1982) ==
Garret FitzGerald's government found itself needing to move quickly to address the deficit. Haughey had criticised John Bruton's emergency budget in July 1981 as unnecessary and deflationary, but, under pressure from his frontbench, he became more accepting of the need for corrective action. The government collapsed when its 1982 budget was defeated over a measure to levy VAT on children's shoes. In the aftermath, Fianna Fáil sought to persuade President Hillery not to dissolve the Dáil and to allow Fianna Fáil to form a new government without an election. In the process, Haughey verbally abused an officer on duty at Áras an Uachtaráin. Hillery viewed this as an attack on the independence of the presidency and granted Garret FitzGerald a dissolution. The episode became a major controversy during the election of Hillery's successor eight years later.

The outgoing government went into the election proposing to continue its deficit reduction policies. There was reportedly a negative "Haughey factor" on the doorsteps, though he was seen to have won the first-ever TV leaders' debate. On the first day of counting, it became clear that Fianna Fáil would gain seats but fall short of a majority. Jim Gibbons and Billy Kenneally publicly called for a leadership debate. Though Des O'Malley emerged as the leading alternative to Haughey, a challenge dissipated when it became clear he did not have sufficient support. On 9 March 1982, Haughey was elected Taoiseach of a minority government with the support of Workers' Party TDs and independent Tony Gregory, with whom he had made a deal to fund urban renewal in inner-city Dublin.

== Taoiseach (1982) ==
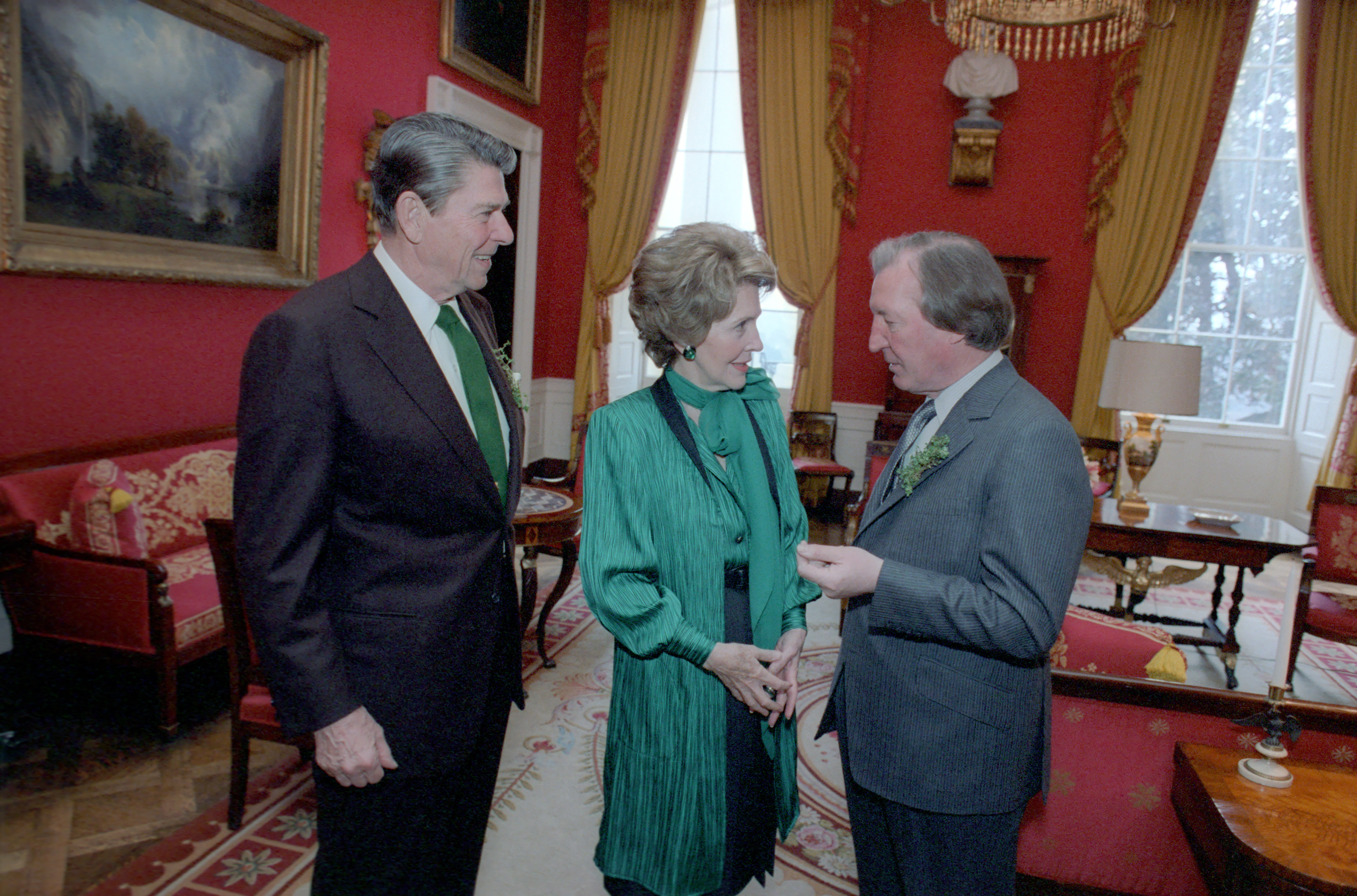
Haughey (right) with US president Ronald Reagan and first lady Nancy Reagan in March 1982

There was surprise when Haughey appointed Seán Doherty, a 37-year-old former Garda, as Minister for Justice. Doherty, a Haughey loyalist, had never previously served at cabinet. George Colley and Des O'Malley believed him totally unsuited to the role. It emerged that Haughey's election agent, Pat O'Connor, had probably voted twice in the February 1982 election, though in the absence of definitive proof, he was not prosecuted. (Note: Under Irish law at the time, it was only a crime to cast two valid votes at an election. This provision allowed O'Connor to avoid prosecution, as it could not be proven that both ballots he cast were valid. The law was subsequently changed.) Attempting to shore up its position in the Dáil, Haughey's government appointed Richard Burke, a Fine Gael former minister, as Ireland's European Commissioner. In the lead up to the by-election campaign in Dublin West, Argentina invaded the Falkland Islands. Haughey's government adopted a neutral position in the ensuing war which was interpreted as anti-British. Fine Gael sensationally won the by-election.

On 22 July, a 27-year-old nurse, Bridie Gargan, was bludgeoned to death while sunbathing in the Phoenix Park in Dublin. The killer, Malcolm MacArthur, later fatally shot a farmer, Dónal Dunne. On 13 August, after a major manhunt, MacArthur was arrested at the home of Patrick Connolly, Haughey's attorney general, who was an acquaintance of his. Not suspected of any crime, Connolly left for a planned holiday the following day, but upon realising the significance of the event, he resigned on 16 August. Haughey's comments on the affair at a subsequent press conference were paraphrased as "grotesque, unbelievable, bizarre and unprecedented"; from this, the journalist Conor Cruise O'Brien coined the acronym "GUBU", which came to characterise the 1982 Haughey government. (Note: Haughey's verbatim description of the incident was "a bizarre happening, an unprecedented situation, a grotesque situation, an almost unbelievable mischance".) Meanwhile, Seán Doherty operated a patronage system in the Department of Justice, doing favours on behalf of friends and Fianna Fáil members. Pat Doocey, the Garda superintendent who had arrested Haughey during the Arms Crisis in 1970, was moved out of the Special Branch. Doherty asked Joe Ainsworth, the deputy Garda commissioner, to tap the phone of Bruce Arnold, a journalist and prominent Haughey critic. Fine Gael frontbenchers had expressed concern that Leinster House phones were being bugged, complaining of hearing voices on the line saying their names. Later, the journalist Geraldine Kennedy had her phone calls listened to by Gardaí.

During the summer, Ray MacSharry, the Minister for Finance, persuaded Haughey of the need to reduce spending. Given the government's reliance on left-wing TDs for its majority, Fianna Fáil expected the resulting plan, called The Way Forward, to lead to an early election at which it would double as its manifesto. In early October, motivated by the budget crisis and the MacArthur affair, Charlie McCreevy tabled a motion of no-confidence in Haughey at a Fianna Fáil parliamentary party meeting. Des O'Malley and Martin O'Donoghue resigned from the government to vote against Haughey. The Taoiseach insisted on a public roll-call vote, which he won by 55 votes to 22. McCreevy and Jim Gibbons, members of the so-called Gang of 22, were physically attacked while leaving Leinster House in the aftermath. Haughey came to be known as "The Boss" from this period onwards; the journalist Stephen Collins later said he ruled his party through fear and intimidation. As expected, The Way Forward led to the Workers' Party and Tony Gregory withdrawing their support. The subsequent general election campaign, the third in eighteen months, was a drab affair. On 24 November, Fine Gael won 39 per cent of the vote, its best-ever showing, and Garret FitzGerald formed a majority coalition with the Labour Party.

== Leader of the Opposition (1982–1987) ==
Four days after Garret FitzGerald became Taoiseach, the Irish Times broke the news of the phone tapping of political journalists. In January 1983, Michael Noonan, the new Minister for Justice, confirmed the story. The Garda commissioner and deputy commissioner both resigned. Rumours that Haughey knew about phone tapping were widespread, and he was in danger of being removed as Fianna Fáil leader. Seán Doherty took public responsibility for the buggings. On 30 January, Donegal TD Clement Coughlan was killed in a car accident; normal politics was put on hold for some days, buying Haughey time. Fianna Fáil members inundated TDs with messages of support for the leader. The parliamentary party approved a motion to accept a committee report exonerating him in a secret ballot, by 40 votes to 33. Haughey did not face another serious challenge to his leadership for the rest of the 1980s.

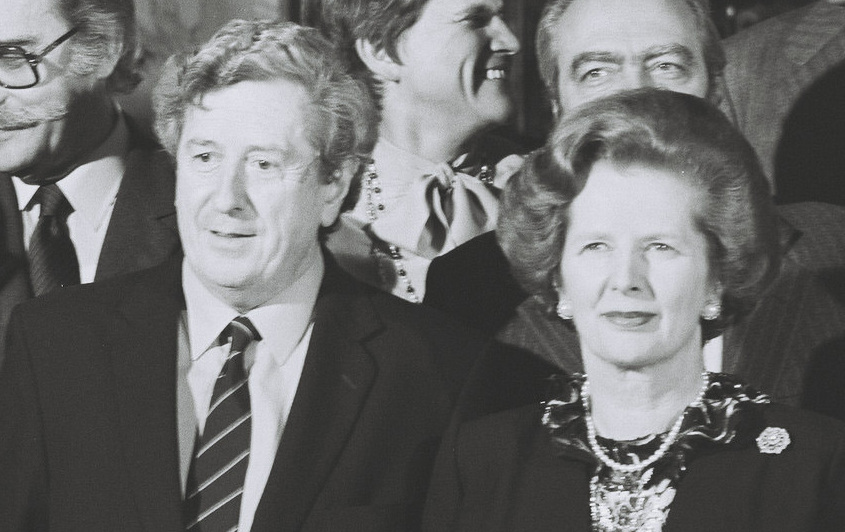
Garret FitzGerald and Margaret Thatcher in 1983. Haughey opposed the Anglo-Irish Agreement, which they signed in 1985.

The New Ireland Forum, convened by Garret FitzGerald in 1983 to establish a consensus negotiating position among constitutional nationalists on the island of Ireland, opened divisions in Fianna Fáil. Although Haughey signed the forum's report, published in 1984, he publicly disagreed with much of it. Haughey was criticised by Des O'Malley, who said Haughey's uncompromising anti-partition stance would frighten the British away from talks. Within a week, O'Malley was expelled from the Fianna Fáil parliamentary party by a vote of 56 to 16. P. J. Mara, Haughey's press secretary, quipped "uno duce, una voce" to journalists, raising Haughey's ire. Haughey now had total control of party policy on Northern Ireland. In 1985, he came out against the Anglo-Irish Agreement immediately after watching its signing by FitzGerald and Margaret Thatcher on television. Public opinion in the Republic opposed Haughey's stance, and it brought him into conflict with the SDLP leader, John Hume. After being expelled from the Fianna Fáil organisation for "conduct unbecoming", Des O'Malley founded a new party, the Progressive Democrats (PDs), in late 1985. (Note: O'Malley was expelled in February 1985 for abstaining in a Dáil vote on the Family Planning Bill, which Fianna Fáil opposed. It was the first time anyone had been ejected from the party for "conduct unbecoming" since Neil Blaney in 1972.) He took several Fianna Fáil TDs with him, including a frontbencher, Bobby Molloy, who resigned and defected in a single day in January 1986, sending shockwaves through the party.

During his time in opposition, Haughey's personal finances declined. It was the responsibility of Des Traynor to "keep the show on the road". Between 1979 and 1986, Haughey received millions of pounds in secret payments from businessmen to multiple accounts at Guinness Mahon, including untaxed offshore accounts on the Cayman Islands. Tracing the origin of this money proved difficult, as much of it came through accounts owned by Traynor. Multiple cheques paid to Fianna Fáil for political expenses ended up in Guinness Mahon accounts and were used to pay Haughey's bills and debts. Despite strict confidentiality, rumours of Haughey's vast bank debts reached the media in January 1983; AIB issued a press release denying the claim. After the collapse of the Gallagher Group, the Revenue Commissioners decided in 1984 not to pursue Haughey for his debts to the company. In the mid-1980s, Haughey helped his son, Ciarán, to found Celtic Helicopters, a rental firm. One of the company's major customers was Ben Dunne and the Dunnes Stores group, and soon Dunne was giving payments to Haughey as well.

In spite of its internal conflicts, Fianna Fáil appeared by 1986 to be on the brink of returning to government. The incumbent coalition was highly unpopular, and the PDs briefly pushed Fine Gael into third place in opinion polls. Emigration and unemployment had reached levels not seen in Ireland since the 1950s, and the government was divided on moral issues. Over the objections of FitzGerald and his attorney general, Peter Sutherland, the Dáil voted to use Fianna Fáil's wording for the Eighth Amendment of the constitution, which banned abortion. The 1986 divorce referendum turned into an embarrassing defeat for FitzGerald and his allies; although Haughey did not take a public stance, Fianna Fáil politicians and activists dominated the No campaign. The government lost its majority in June 1986, and Labour withdrew from the coalition seven months later.

Fianna Fáil campaigned in the 1987 election on the message "health cuts hurt the old, the sick and the handicapped". Haughey proposed a model of social partnership in which the trade unions would co-operate with the government to improve the public finances without labour unrest. The flagship of the Fianna Fáil manifesto was a proposal for an international financial centre in Dublin, an idea given to Haughey by the businessman Dermot Desmond. At the election, Fianna Fáil fell two seats short of a majority, as the PDs capitalised on a collapse in support for Fine Gael. After Tony Gregory abstained to avoid another election, the Dáil vote was tied, 82 to 82, and Haughey was elected Taoiseach on the casting vote of the Ceann Comhairle. (Note: Haughey also served as his own Minister for the Gaeltacht from 1987 to 1992.)

== Taoiseach (1987–1992) ==
=== Minority government (1987–1989) ===
Garret FitzGerald told Haughey that Fine Gael would not oppose policies necessary to improve the public finances. His successor as party leader, Alan Dukes, continued this approach in the Tallaght Strategy. Haughey supported efforts by Ray MacSharry, back as Minister for Finance, to reduce public spending. MacSharry's first budget was severe, going beyond the measures proposed by Fine Gael. Social partnership was launched by Haughey, MacSharry, and the new Minister for Labour, Bertie Ahern; after negotiations with the trade unions, an agreement, the Programme for National Recovery, was reached in October 1987.

Through Father Alec Reid, Haughey had opened up a secret channel of communication with the president of Sinn Féin, Gerry Adams. In May 1987, on Reid's instructions, the journalist Tim Pat Coogan brought a dossier to Haughey's home at Kinsealy, detailing proposals for an IRA ceasefire. The document demonstrated Adams's desire to end republican violence and suggested willingness to accept a negotiated settlement which fell short of Irish unity. Haughey repeatedly refused to meet Adams in person. John Hume became an intermediary between Adams and Haughey, while Martin Mansergh, a Haughey advisor, acted as the Taoiseach's representative with Reid. The Enniskillen bombing in November 1987 led to a breakdown in talks, as Haughey concluded that Sinn Féin was more interested in ending its political isolation than stopping violence.

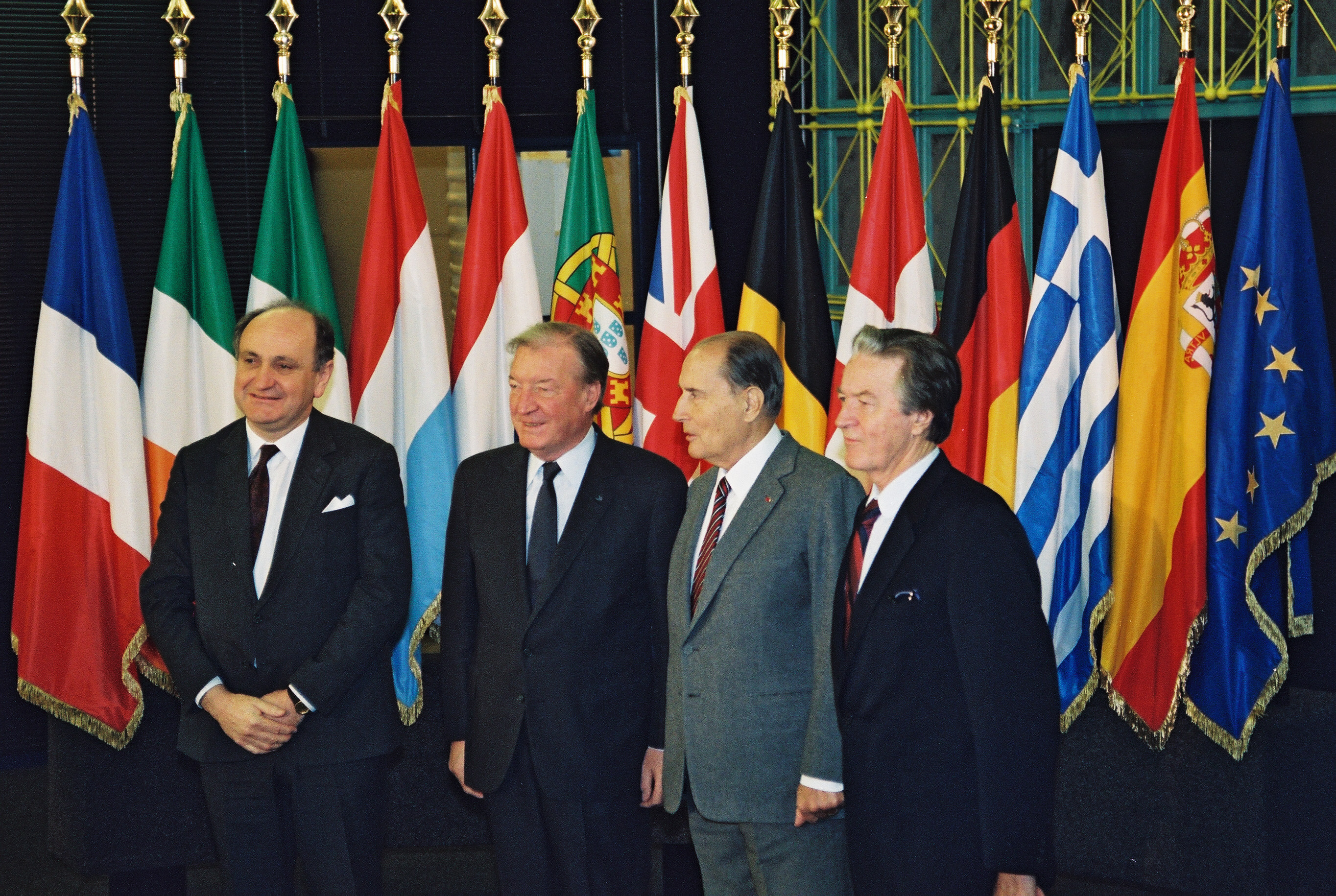
From left to right: Minister for Foreign Affairs Gerry Collins, Haughey, French president François Mitterrand and French foreign minister Roland Dumas at a European Council meeting in Strasbourg in 1989

In late 1987, Des Traynor asked Dermot Desmond and other businessmen to form a consortium to pay Haughey's debts, but Desmond refused due to the difficult financial situation following the recent stock market crash. Some weeks later, Desmond met Ben Dunne at a golf club, and Dunne told him that he had made a confidential donation to Haughey. The following year, Haughey bought a yacht, the Celtic Mist, for £120,000 (about €350,000 in 2025). Repairs to the yacht, which cost more than £70,000, were paid for by Desmond. During this period, Haughey used the Fianna Fáil leader's publicly funded allowance account to pay his personal expenses, including Charvet shirts and meals at Le Coq Hardi, an upmarket Dublin restaurant. Bertie Ahern, who oversaw the account but was often away on ministerial work, signed blank cheques which were later used at the restaurant. In October 1988, Haughey was hospitalised for almost three weeks after suffering bronchial spasms which impaired his breathing. He had been experiencing respiratory issues and recurrent kidney stones since returning to office in 1987.

In late 1988, with the public finances recovering, Ray MacSharry was appointed to the European Commission and replaced as Minister for Finance by Albert Reynolds. Haughey pushed through plans for the International Financial Services Centre – later one of the success stories of the Celtic Tiger – and with the economy improving, the Taoiseach was as popular as he had ever been. In April 1989, Haughey caused a sensation when he suggested he might call a snap election if the government lost a vote on a Labour private member's bill. Most of the government was against an early election, but Haughey was encouraged by Ray Burke and Pádraig Flynn. (Note: It later emerged that Burke and Flynn each received five-figure payments from businessmen during the 1989 election campaign. Disclosure of payments contributed to Burke's resignation as Bertie Ahern's Minister for Foreign Affairs in 1997, and to Flynn not being re-nominated as a European Commissioner in 1999. Burke spent four and a half months in prison in 2005 for tax evasion relating to payments he received from backers of Century Radio while he was Charles Haughey's Minister for Communications. Both men testified before the Planning Tribunal, and the payments they received were described as corrupt in the final report. Findings of corruption in relation to Burke were dropped in 2015.) Haughey called an election for 15 June.

The election campaign focused on health cuts, and the result was a fiasco, as Fianna Fáil lost four seats, leaving it seven short of a majority. Alan Dukes rejected a continuation of the Tallaght Strategy, viewing the snap election as a betrayal. Haughey's sole realistic option was to work with his former nemesis, Des O'Malley, and the Progressive Democrats. Fianna Fáil began negotiations in early July. Six cabinet ministers spoke against abandoning the core value of not entering coalition; Pádraig Flynn was the most vehement. On 12 July, Haughey and O'Malley agreed a coalition personally, bypassing official negotiators. "Nobody but myself could have done it," Haughey remarked, while shaking hands with the PD leader.

=== Coalition (1989–1992) ===
The Fianna Fáil–Progressive Democrats coalition was remarkably stable. Relations between Haughey and O'Malley were businesslike but never warm. The economy continued to grow, and taxes were reduced as part of the next social partnership deal. Although an opinion poll in 1990 showed 85 per cent of Fianna Fáil voters supported the coalition, compromises with the PDs rankled with the parliamentary party.

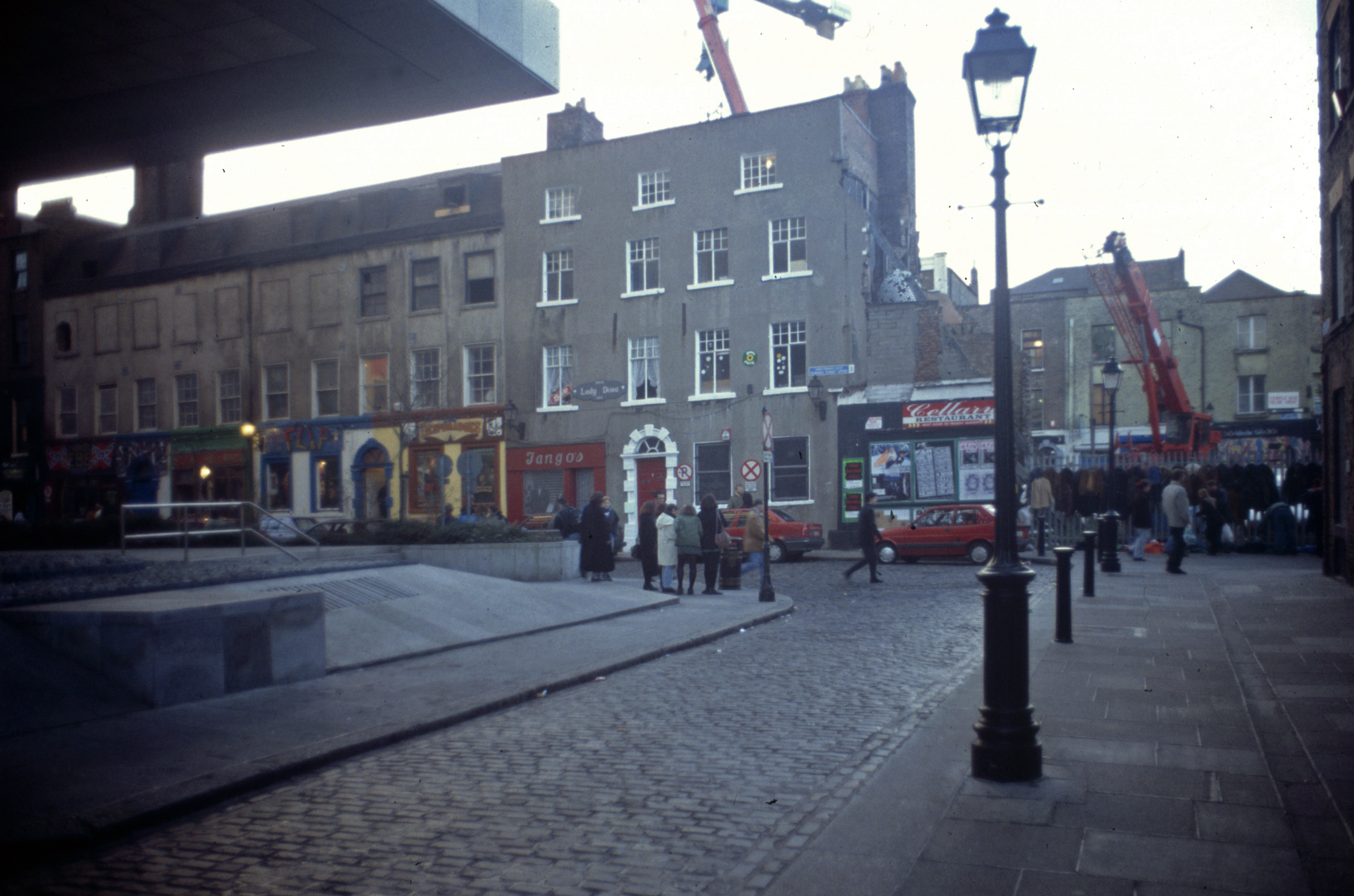
Temple Bar in 1993, with regeneration in progress

Ireland was to hold the European Council presidency in 1990. The government's intention was to focus on sustainability, but the fall of the Berlin Wall in November 1989 changed its plans. Haughey was an enthusiastic supporter of German reunification, and put it on the EC agenda over the objections of Margaret Thatcher and François Mitterrand. A summit at Dublin Castle in June 1990 was widely regarded as a success; a few weeks after reunification in October, German chancellor Helmut Kohl wrote a letter to Haughey thanking him for his "personal support". During 1990, Haughey presided over the redevelopment of Government Buildings, insisting on the use of Irish timber, artists, and craftsmen. The refurbishment, which cost £17.6 million, later won a number of awards. Haughey also steered the regeneration of the Temple Bar district of Dublin after lobbying from the musician Bono, among others. Haughey's public image during this period was influenced by Dermot Morgan's depiction of him on the satirical radio programme Scrap Saturday. Dialogues with P. J. Mara, played by Owen Roe, portrayed Haughey as venal and vain; they were described by the Haughey biographer Patrick Maume as "an absurd and toothless ogre berating an obsequious P. J. Mara".

In the late 1980s, Brian Lenihan, a senior Fianna Fáil minister, became sick with liver disease. By 1989, he was gravely ill. Lenihan needed a transplant at the Mayo Clinic in the United States, likely to cost up to £200,000, or he would die within weeks. At Haughey's behest, the money for Lenihan's operation was soon collected from businessmen sympathetic to Fianna Fáil; it later emerged that more than half of Lenihan's fund ended up in Haughey's own accounts. After his transplant, Lenihan made a good recovery, and in September 1990, he was nominated as Fianna Fáil's candidate for the presidential election. Initially the heavy favourite to win, Lenihan's campaign ran aground over whether or not he had contacted outgoing president Patrick Hillery by telephone to prevent a Dáil dissolution in 1982. With his memory likely affected by anti-rejection drugs, Lenihan told contradictory stories. The Progressive Democrats expected him to clarify that he did call Hillery, a story well known in political circles, but he persisted in disputing the claim. With the coalition at risk, Haughey sacked Lenihan from the government. Lenihan remained a presidential candidate; though he lost the election to Mary Robinson, a sympathy factor following his dismissal was credited with giving him a respectable 44 per cent of the vote. Fianna Fáil had never previously lost a presidential contest, and afterwards, party members started to consider life after Haughey.

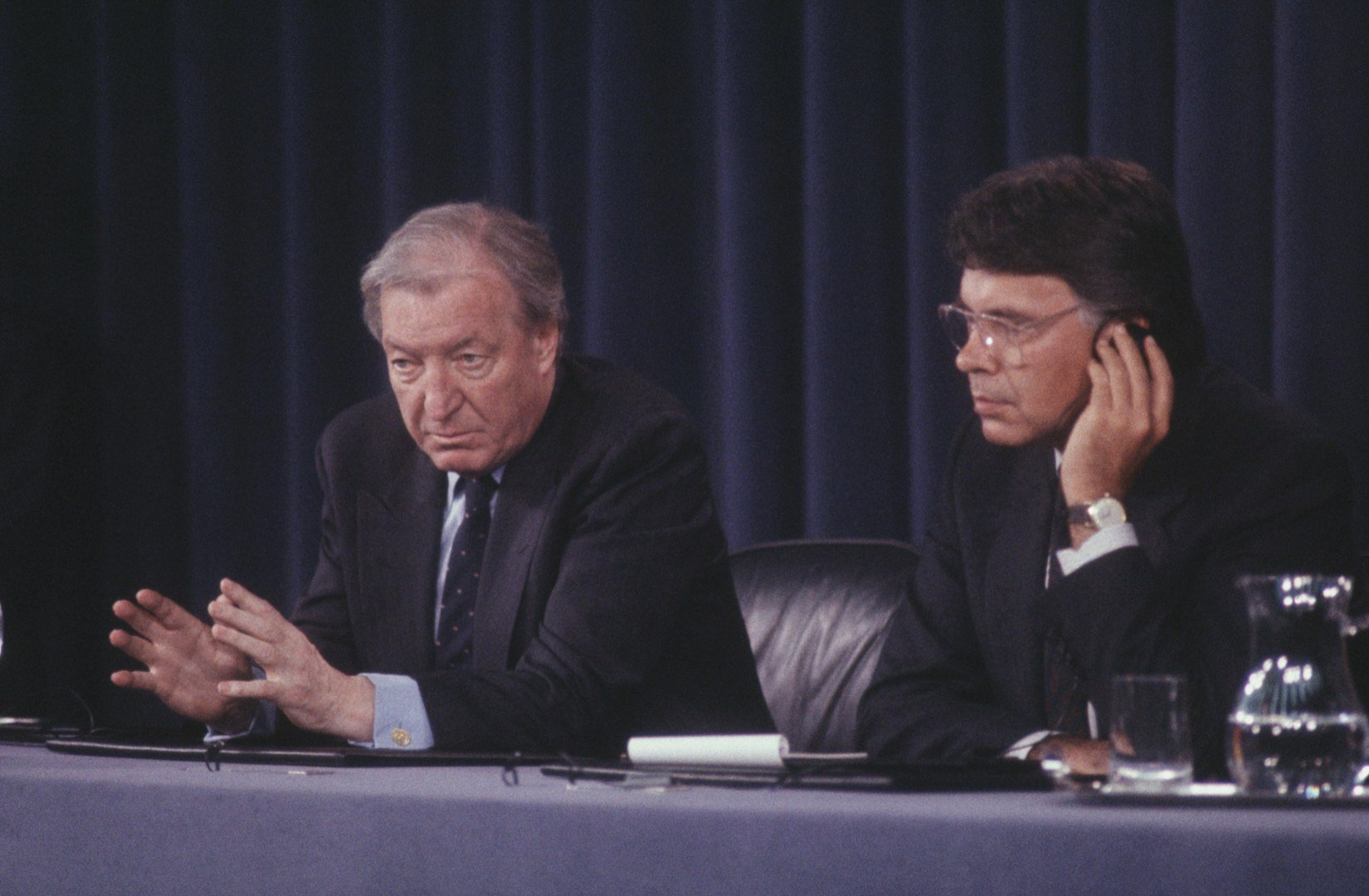
Haughey (left) and Spanish prime minister Felipe González at the Moncloa Palace in 1990

The government was beset by scandals in 1991. In May, a tribunal was established into alleged malpractice in the beef industry. It focused on the actions of Larry Goodman, a friend of Haughey's whose firm had been supported by government policy. Goodman's business, which had been exporting beef to Iraq, went into examinership following the Iraqi invasion of Kuwait in August 1990. Subsequent investigations, including one by Granada Television's World in Action programme, uncovered significant irregularities. (Note: Goodman's company was accused of abusing European Communities subsidies, obtaining state insurance for beef exports which were not Irish in origin, avoidance of tax, and tampering with official stamps and documents.) Reports of insider dealing and overinflated property transactions in the semi-state sector raised the spectre of a golden circle of crony capitalists linked to Haughey. Though he was not directly implicated in these controversies, they put Haughey on the defensive. In September 1991, he went on the radio to call on Michael Smurfit and Séamus Paircéir, two semi-state chairs, to resign. Though both men stood down, they were outraged by the public demand, and there was fierce opposition in the Fianna Fáil parliamentary party.

==== Downfall and resignation ====
Coalition had created serious disquiet in Fianna Fáil, including among ministers. Albert Reynolds described it as the moment he lost faith in Haughey. Pádraig Flynn called it a "dirty little deal" intended to keep Haughey in power at all costs. Because the PDs had two seats at cabinet, Fianna Fáil backbenchers viewed their chances of advancement under Haughey as slim. Critics of Haughey, a predominantly rural bloc led by Reynolds, became known colloquially as the "country and western wing".

In a September 1991 interview, Haughey joked about staying on as Taoiseach, saying: "Some of these Chinese leaders go on until they are eighty or ninety, but I think that's probably a bit long." Within weeks, four Fianna Fáil backbenchers publicly called on Haughey to retire before the next election. After an acrimonious parliamentary party meeting on 6 November, a no-confidence motion was tabled by Seán Power. Albert Reynolds and Pádraig Flynn said they would support it and were sacked from the government. Gerry Collins, a Haughey supporter, went on television to plead with Reynolds not to "wreck our party right down the centre". The motion was defeated by 55 votes to 22 in a roll-call vote, but it was generally accepted that Haughey could not go on much longer. It was in this context that Ben Dunne visited Haughey at Abbeville in November 1991 and found him depressed. On impulse, Dunne gave him three bank drafts, worth £70,000 each, which had been intended for Dunne himself and two others. In response, Haughey said "Thank you, big fella" and conveyed the money to Des Traynor.

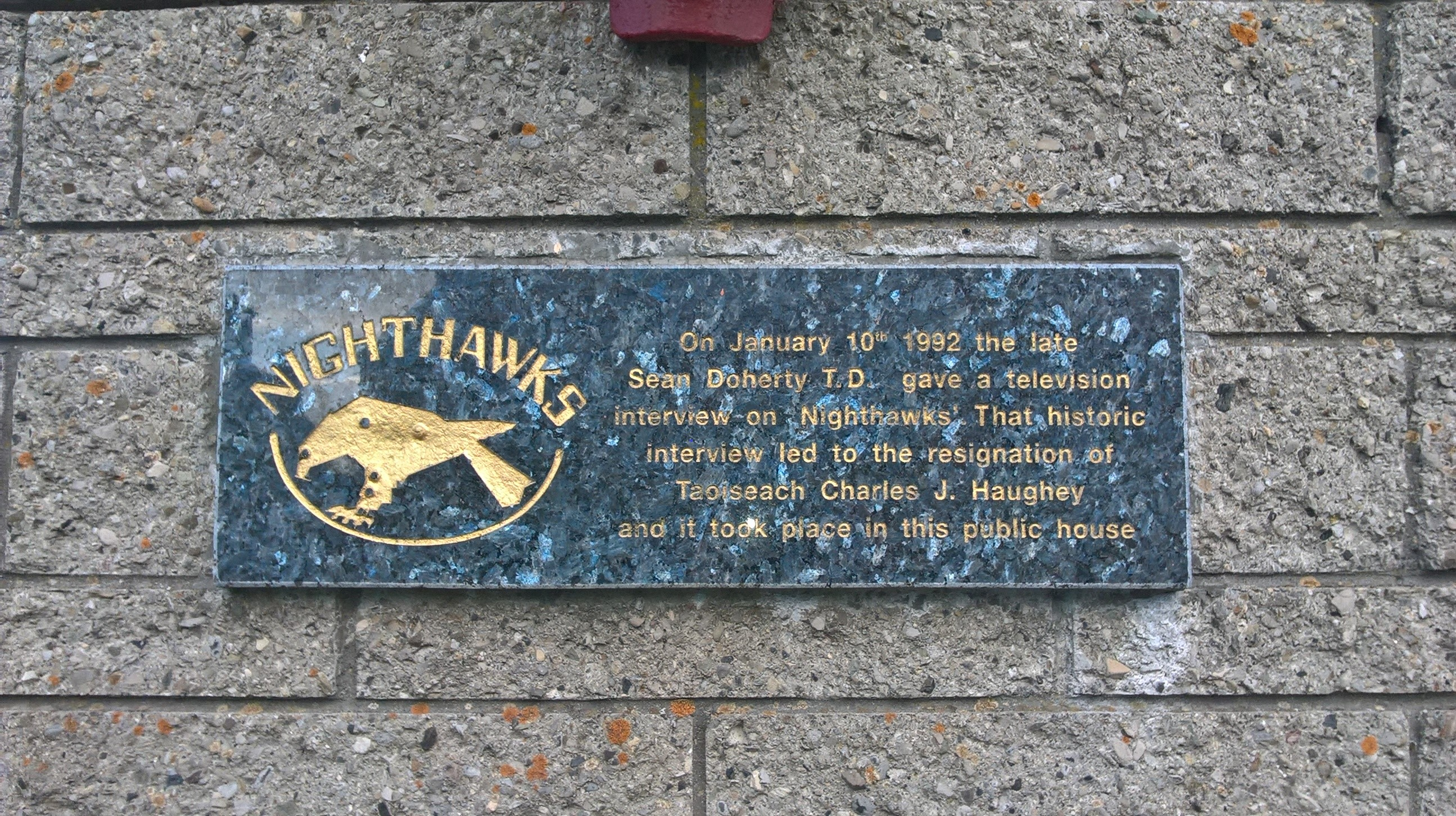
Plaque in Castlerea, County Roscommon, commemorating Seán Doherty's Nighthawks interview

Haughey's former Minister for Justice, Seán Doherty, had felt betrayed after Haughey failed to support his nomination as Cathaoirleach of Seanad Éireann in 1989. He was affronted by the government's introduction of a Phone Tapping Bill in late 1991. In January 1992, he went on an RTÉ television programme, Nighthawks, and told interviewer Shay Healy that the cabinet had discussed the tapping of journalists' phones in 1982. Des O'Malley, who had also been a minister in 1982, said he had not been part of any discussions and that phone tapping had never been discussed at cabinet. On 21 January, after days of silence, Doherty made a further press statement, saying that he had brought transcripts of recorded conversations to Haughey personally, and that he had taken the blame for phone tapping to protect his leader. Now Haughey was fighting for his political life.

On 30 January, after the Progressive Democrats threatened to withdraw from the coalition unless he resigned, Haughey announced his resignation to prevent the collapse of the government. He was succeeded by Albert Reynolds, after failing to persuade Bertie Ahern to stand against him for the leadership. In his farewell speech to the Dáil on 11 February, he said: "I might quote, perhaps, Othello: 'I have done the state some service; they know't. No more of that.'" He concluded: "Let the record speak for itself. If I were to seek any accolade as I leave office it would simply be: he served the people, all the people, to the best of his ability." Haughey retired from the Dáil at the general election later in 1992 and was replaced in his Dublin North-Central constituency by his son, Seán Haughey.

== Retirement and tribunals ==
On 20 February 1992, nine days after Haughey stood down as Taoiseach, Ben Dunne suffered a panic attack in a hotel room in Lake Buena Vista, Florida, while with an escort. When police arrived to subdue him, they discovered 32.5 grams of cocaine in the room. He was arrested and charged with drug possession and trafficking. The story became national news in Ireland, and led to the breakdown of Dunne's relationship with his family. As part of a bitter legal battle, Dunne threatened to destroy the Dunnes Stores trust by revealing how he had used it for his own purposes, including a payment of more than a million pounds to Charles Haughey. A settlement was agreed in late 1994, preventing the information becoming public.

Haughey was diagnosed with prostate cancer in 1994, but was told it was manageable and would not require an operation. The early years of his retirement focused on his pastimes of sailing, horse riding, and horse racing, and trips to France and Inishvickillane. He was interviewed on RTÉ's Kenny Live in 1994 and received a warm reception from the audience. His horse, Flashing Steel, won the 1995 Irish Grand National.

In November 1996, the Irish Independent broke the story of a payment of £200,000 given by Ben Dunne to Michael Lowry, by now a Fine Gael minister, to fund the renovation of his home. Lowry resigned from the government on 2 December, and the following day, The Irish Times reported that a senior Fianna Fáil politician had received a larger payment from Dunne. It was widely understood in political circles that the story referred to Haughey. In the immediate aftermath, Haughey repeatedly contacted Noel Smyth, Ben Dunne's solicitor. They met in person several times. Though most of the payments to Haughey were made to accounts with no direct link to him, in February 1997, Dunne remembered that he had handed Haughey three bank drafts in late 1991. Noel Smyth brought copies of the drafts to Haughey at Kinsealy; Haughey told Smyth he had given the drafts to Des Traynor, who had died in 1994, revealing the link between Haughey and the other accounts. Smyth later recalled that Haughey recognised that the documentation was "lethal" and was panicked.

In February 1997, the Oireachtas voted to establish a tribunal led by Judge Brian McCracken to investigate payments given by Dunnes Stores. On 24 March, Ben Dunne gave the tribunal a lengthy statement which included an outline of payments to Haughey. Noel Smyth encouraged Haughey to come clean to the tribunal, but he refused, insisting publicly that he had no knowledge of ever receiving payments from Dunne. The tribunal found evidence of money being transferred from Haughey's offshore Ansbacher accounts to his bill-paying accounts. On 30 June, Haughey delivered a statement to the tribunal confirming he had received payments from Dunne, but denying he had known about them at the time. He insisted that Des Traynor had run his financial affairs without reference to him. Smyth then came forward with records of phone calls Haughey had made to him after Michael Lowry's resignation in late 1996 and early 1997. It was clear that Haughey had lied to the tribunal and to his legal team.

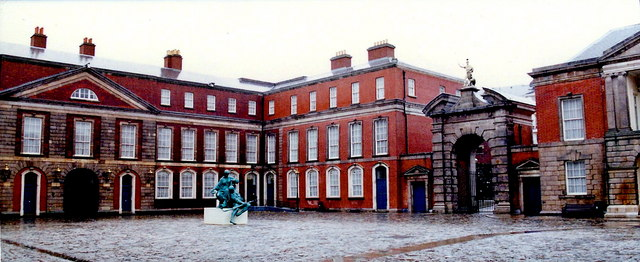
Haughey was booed in the upper yard of Dublin Castle when he testified before the McCracken Tribunal

Haughey appeared before the tribunal on 15 July 1997. He gave a statement which said: "I accept that I have not co-operated with this tribunal in a manner which would have been expected of me". He said he had difficulty remembering incidents during his time in public life and again blamed Des Traynor for his financial affairs. Upon leaving the tribunal, Haughey was booed by most of the crowd waiting in the upper yard of Dublin Castle. One man rushed forward to shake his hand. McCracken's final report said: "It is quite unacceptable that a member of Dáil Éireann, and in particular a cabinet member and Taoiseach, should be supported in his lifestyle by gifts made to him personally". He said Haughey's evidence was not credible.

The journalist Sam Smyth recalled hearing of how passengers on a bus in Raheny, in Haughey's former constituency, spontaneously burst into applause when they heard on the radio that he had evaded the press on his way to the McCracken Tribunal. The businessman Patrick Gallagher said he bankrolled Haughey "to create the environment which the Anglo-Irish enjoyed and that we as a people could never aspire to ... Someone had to live in the big house." As Fianna Fáil leader, Bertie Ahern made comments about standards in public life at the party's 1997 ardfheis which were interpreted as criticism of Haughey. Haughey was booed by mourners on the streets of Cork at the funeral of Jack Lynch in 1999, and his leadership was largely ignored during celebrations of Fianna Fáil's seventy-fifth anniversary in 2001.

For many years, Terry Keane had referred to a politician as "Sweetie" in her newspaper column. In May 1999, against Haughey's wishes, Keane went on RTÉ's The Late Late Show to speak about her 27-year affair with him. Keane gave more details in her memoir, which was serialised in The Sunday Times. Many who knew Haughey found some of her claims to be embellished and unlikely. (Note: Specifically, Keane's declared influence over Haughey's political activities, and a claim that he had planned to leave politics and move to France with her in the early 1980s.) Maureen Haughey was deeply hurt by the disclosures; Charles Haughey never spoke to Keane again. In 2006, shortly before Haughey's death, Keane expressed regret at speaking publicly.

The Moriarty Tribunal, a wider investigation into payments to politicians, began in 1997 and lasted more than a decade. In 1999, it revealed that Haughey had misappropriated funds from Brian Lenihan's transplant fund; former colleagues regarded this as a betrayal of a loyal friend. Haughey appeared before the Circuit Court in October 1999 charged with obstructing the McCracken Tribunal. In June 2000, the charges were suspended indefinitely due to concerns about prejudicial media coverage, including comments by Tánaiste Mary Harney that Haughey should go to prison. The same year, Haughey paid a £6 million tax bill over undisclosed income, funded by selling part of the Abbeville estate. He sold the rest of it in 2005 for about €35 million, though he continued to live there until his death. The final report of the Moriarty Tribunal, issued after Haughey's death, concluded that he had received a total of just over £9.1 million (€11 million) in payments, and declared that Haughey's actions had "devalued the quality of a modern democracy".

== Death and funeral ==
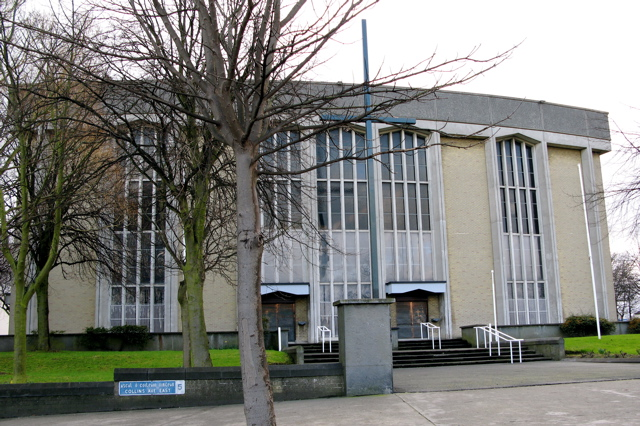
The Church of Our Lady of Consolation in Donnycarney, where Haughey's funeral took place

Haughey's appearances at the Moriarty Tribunal became shorter and more sporadic as his prostate cancer progressed. In March 2001, he suffered a near-fatal cardiac arrhythmia and spent ten days in Beaumont Hospital. His cancer became aggressive in mid-2005. Haughey died at his home in Kinsealy on the morning of 13 June 2006, aged eighty.

Haughey received a state funeral on 16 June. His funeral mass, at the Church of Our Lady of Consolation in Donnycarney, was celebrated by his brother, Father Eoghan Haughey. It was attended by President Mary McAleese and many serving and former politicians, and was broadcast live on television. The Taoiseach, Bertie Ahern, delivered the graveside oration at St. Fintan's Cemetery, Sutton. He said: "I have no doubt that the ultimate judgment of history will be positive. He was one of the most consequential of Irishmen." His epitaph is a quote from an 1844 poem by Thomas Davis, "My Grave".

== Legacy and historical appraisal ==
Haughey was the most complex and divisive figure in late 20th-century Ireland. Some of his policy initiatives bore fruit in the 1990s, but he was also partly responsible for Ireland's economic failures in the 1980s and his opposition to the Anglo-Irish Agreement puzzled commentators. Disclosures about Haughey's personal finances after his retirement disgraced him and contributed to a popular view of Ireland as a corrupt country. Assessments of Haughey's ranking among former Taoisigh are highly mixed. A 2022 public poll placed him seventh out of fifteen officeholders. Haughey was voted in the top 40 of Ireland's Greatest in 2010, alongside former Taoisigh de Valera, Lemass, Lynch, and FitzGerald.

Dermot Desmond and the economist Marc Coleman described Haughey as the father of the Celtic Tiger, but the broadcaster Henry Kelly strongly disagreed. The author Colm Tóibín gave Haughey credit for his support of the arts, but wrote that artists also "owe [Haughey and his colleagues] a debt of gratitude for creating a country that often made no sense, for using a rhetoric that was far from reality." The journalist Michael Viney praised Haughey's support for Ireland's heritage and wildlife, saying: "The idea of the Heritage Council, the state’s sanctuary for whales and dolphins, the rescue of Coolattin Woods, in Co Wicklow, the Discovery archaeology programme, the Céide Fields go-ahead: all were among things to his credit." A biographer of Haughey, T. Ryle Dwyer, remarked that opposing the Anglo-Irish Agreement was Haughey's greatest mistake, and involved him "playing politics with the lives of people in Northern Ireland and elsewhere". The journalist Ed Moloney wrote that Haughey sowed the seeds of the peace process at considerable political risk, but his history with republicanism made it difficult for him to take the next steps.

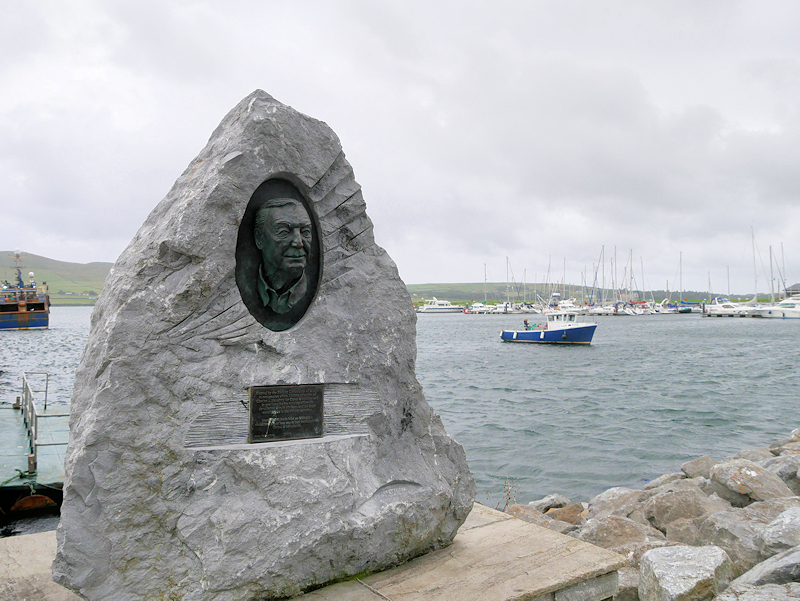
Haughey monument in Dingle

Haughey's portrait in Leinster House was painted by John Kelly. In Dingle, where Haughey enjoyed considerable popularity, a bust was erected by fishermen in 2005 to commemorate his contribution to the redevelopment of the local harbour. Bertie Ahern was often described by media as Haughey's former protégé; a 1991 comment by Haughey, that he was "the best, the most skilful, the most devious, and the most cunning of them all" was quoted widely after his resignation as Taoiseach over the Mahon Tribunal in 2008. After his death, Haughey was accused of sexual harassment by the broadcaster Anne Robinson and the former Fine Gael minister Gemma Hussey.

Haughey wrote a memoir but it was never published. In 2005, RTÉ broadcast a four-part documentary series about his life, called Haughey. John A. Murphy called it "gripping television from beginning to end", but also wrote that "the now fashionable attempts to rehabilitate Haughey were evident throughout". Martin Mansergh said that it was "neither a black-and-white morality tale nor a rehabilitation". In 2010, Haughey's family donated his personal papers to Dublin City University; these formed the basis for an authorised biography, also called Haughey, written by the academic Gary Murphy and published in 2021. The journalist David McCullagh said it was "the closest we'll ever get to what Charles Haughey actually thought about the various controversies in which he was embroiled". Conor Lenihan, a former Fianna Fáil TD and the son of Brian Lenihan, criticised the book as unduly lenient, saying it omitted detail about corruption and the affair with Terry Keane. In 2025, the academic Eoin O'Malley published a book, Charlie vs Garret, chronicling the rivalry between Haughey and Garret FitzGerald, whom he first met at university.

== Works ==
- Mansergh, Martin; O'Kelly, Fionnuala, eds. (1986). The Spirit of the Nation: the Speeches and Statements of Charles J. Haughey (1957–1986). Cork: Mercier Press. ISBN 0853427593.
- Montgomery, Guy, ed. (1986). Charles Haughey's Ireland. Pipeline Productions for Channel 4.

== Notes and sources ==
=== Sources ===
- Collins, Stephen (1992). The Haughey File: The Unprecedented Career and Last Years of The Boss. Dublin: O'Brien Press. ISBN 0862782988.
- Collins, Stephen (2000). The Power Game: Ireland under Fianna Fáil. Dublin: O'Brien Press. ISBN 9780862785888.
- Dwyer, T. Ryle (1994). Short Fellow: A Biography of Charles J. Haughey. Marino. ISBN 1-86023-142-X.
- Ferriter, Diarmaid (2012). Ambiguous Republic: Ireland in the 1970s. Profile Books. ISBN 9781846684685.
- Foster, R.F. (2007). Luck and the Irish: A Brief History of Change, 1970–2000. Allen Lane. ISBN 9780141911977.
- Heney, Michael (2020). The Arms Crisis of 1970: The Plot that Never Was. London: Head of Zeus. ISBN 9781789545609.
- Joyce, Joe; Murtagh, Peter (1983). The Boss: Charles J. Haughey in Government. Dublin: Poolbeg Press. ISBN 0905169697.
- Keena, Colm (2001). Haughey's Millions: Charlie's Money Trail. Dublin: Gill & Macmillan. ISBN 978-0717130993.
- Kelly, Stephen (2016). 'A Failed Political Entity': Charles Haughey and the Northern Ireland Question. Newbridge: Merrion Press. ISBN 978-1-78537-101-1.
- Murphy, Gary (2021). Haughey. Dublin: Gill Books. ISBN 9780717193646.
- O'Malley, Eoin (2025). Charlie vs. Garret: The Rivalry That Shaped Modern Ireland. London: Eriu. ISBN 978-1-80444-269-2.
- Whelan, Noel (2011). Fianna Fáil: A Biography of the Party. Dublin: Gill Books. ISBN 9780717151981.

=== Further reading ===
- Arnold, Bruce (1993). Haughey: His Life and Unlucky Deeds. London: HarperCollins. ISBN 0002552124.
- Burke, David (2022). An Enemy of the Crown: The British Secret Service Campaign Against Charles Haughey. Cork: Mercier Press. ISBN 9781781178218.
- Dunlop, Frank (2004). Yes, Taoiseach: Irish politics from behind closed doors. Penguin Ireland. ISBN 1-84488-035-4.
- Dwyer, T. Ryle (2003). Haughey's Forty Years of Controversy. Mercier Press. ISBN 978-1856354264.
- Kelly, Stephen (2016a). "'The Totality of Relationships': The Haughey-Thatcher Relationship and the Anglo-Irish Summit Meeting, 8 December 1980". Eire-Ireland. 51 (3): 244–273. doi:10.1353/eir.2016.0025.
- Lenihan, Conor (2015). Haughey: Prince of Power. Cork: Blackwater Press. ISBN 9781909974067.
- O'Connor, Philip (2020). A very political project: Charles Haughey, social partnership and the pursuit of an Irish economic miracle, 1969–92 (PDF) (PhD). Dublin City University.
- O'Donnell, Catherine (2003). "Fianna Fáil and Sinn Féin: the 1988 talks reappraised". Irish Political Studies. 18 (2): 60–81. doi:10.1080/1364298042000227659. S2CID 144826967.
- O'Donnell, Catherine (2007). Fianna Fáil, Irish Republicanism and the Northern Ireland Troubles 1968–2005. Dublin: Irish Academic Press. ISBN 9780716528593.
- O'Malley, Eoin (2024). Ireland's Long Economic Boom: The Celtic Tiger Economy, 1986–2007. Palgrave Studies in Economic History. Cham: Palgrave Macmillian. doi:10.1007/978-3-031-53070-8. ISBN 978-3-031-53070-8.
- Smyth, Sam (1997). Thanks a Million Big Fella. Cork: Blackwater Press. ISBN 9780861219520.
- Sweeney, Eamonn (2010). Down Down Deeper and Down: Ireland in the 70s & 80s. Gill & Macmillan. ISBN 978-0717146338.
- Wilsford, David, ed. (1995). Political leaders of contemporary Western Europe: a biographical dictionary. Greenwood. pp. 188–195.

=== External links ===
- Media related to Charles Haughey at Wikimedia Commons
- Quotations related to Charles Haughey at Wikiquote
- charlesjhaughey.ie "The official memorial website ... established with the consent of his family"

Political offices
New office	Parliamentary Secretary to the Minister for Justice; 1959–1961	Succeeded by Brian Lenihan
Preceded by Oscar Traynor	Minister for Justice; 1961–1964	Succeeded by Brian Lenihan
Preceded by Paddy Smith	Minister for Agriculture; Minister for Agriculture and Fisheries from July 1965; 1964–1966	Succeeded by Neil Blaney
Preceded by Jack Lynch	Minister for Finance; 1966–1970	Succeeded by George Colley
Preceded by Brendan Corish	Minister for Health; 1977–1979	Succeeded by Michael Woods
Preceded by Brendan Corish	Minister for Social Welfare; 1977–1979	Succeeded by Michael Woods
Preceded by Jack Lynch	Taoiseach; 1979–1981	Succeeded by Garret FitzGerald
Preceded by Garret FitzGerald	Leader of the Opposition; 1981–1982	Succeeded by Garret FitzGerald
Preceded by Garret FitzGerald	Taoiseach; March–December 1982	Succeeded by Garret FitzGerald
Preceded by Garret FitzGerald	Leader of the Opposition; 1982–1987	Succeeded by Alan Dukes
Preceded by Garret FitzGerald	Taoiseach; 1987–1992	Succeeded by Albert Reynolds
Preceded by Paddy O'Toole	Minister for the Gaeltacht; 1987–1992	Succeeded by John Wilson
Party political offices
Preceded by Jack Lynch	Leader of Fianna Fáil; 1979–1992	Succeeded by Albert Reynolds

Dáil	Election	Deputy (Party)	Deputy (Party)	Deputy (Party)	Deputy (Party)	Deputy (Party)
9th	1937	Alfie Byrne (Ind.)	Oscar Traynor (FF)	James Larkin (Ind.)	3 seats 1937–1948	
10th	1938	Alfie Byrne (Ind.)	Oscar Traynor (FF)	Richard Mulcahy (FG)	3 seats 1937–1948	
11th	1943	Alfie Byrne (Ind.)	Oscar Traynor (FF)	James Larkin (Lab)	3 seats 1937–1948	
12th	1944	Alfie Byrne (Ind.)	Oscar Traynor (FF)	Harry Colley (FF)	3 seats 1937–1948	
13th	1948	Alfie Byrne (Ind.)	Oscar Traynor (FF)	Harry Colley (FF)	Jack Belton (FG)	Peadar Cowan (CnaP)
14th	1951	Alfie Byrne (Ind.)	Oscar Traynor (FF)	Harry Colley (FF)	Jack Belton (FG)	Peadar Cowan (Ind.)
15th	1954	Alfie Byrne (Ind.)	Oscar Traynor (FF)	Harry Colley (FF)	Jack Belton (FG)	Denis Larkin (Lab)
15th	1956 by-election	Patrick Byrne (FG)	Oscar Traynor (FF)	Harry Colley (FF)	Jack Belton (FG)	Denis Larkin (Lab)
16th	1957	Patrick Byrne (FG)	Oscar Traynor (FF)	Charles Haughey (FF)	Jack Belton (FG)	Denis Larkin (Lab)
17th	1961	Patrick Byrne (FG)	George Colley (FF)	Charles Haughey (FF)	Jack Belton (FG)	Eugene Timmons (FF)
17th	1963 by-election	Patrick Byrne (FG)	George Colley (FF)	Charles Haughey (FF)	Paddy Belton (FG)	Eugene Timmons (FF)
18th	1965	Patrick Byrne (FG)	George Colley (FF)	Charles Haughey (FF)	Paddy Belton (FG)	Denis Larkin (Lab)
19th	1969	Conor Cruise O'Brien (Lab)	Eugene Timmons (FF)	Charles Haughey (FF)	Paddy Belton (FG)	4 seats 1969–1977
20th	1973	Conor Cruise O'Brien (Lab)	Eugene Timmons (FF)	Charles Haughey (FF)	Paddy Belton (FG)	4 seats 1969–1977
21st	1977	Constituency abolished				

Dáil	Election	Deputy (Party)	Deputy (Party)	Deputy (Party)	Deputy (Party)
22nd	1981	Michael Woods (FF)	Liam Fitzgerald (FF)	Seán Dublin Bay Rockall Loftus (Ind.)	Michael Joe Cosgrave (FG)
23rd	1982 (Feb)	Michael Woods (FF)	Maurice Manning (FG)	Ned Brennan (FF)	Michael Joe Cosgrave (FG)
24th	1982 (Nov)	Michael Woods (FF)	Maurice Manning (FG)	Liam Fitzgerald (FF)	Michael Joe Cosgrave (FG)
25th	1987	Michael Woods (FF)	Pat McCartan (WP)	Liam Fitzgerald (FF)	Michael Joe Cosgrave (FG)
26th	1989	Michael Woods (FF)	Pat McCartan (WP)	Liam Fitzgerald (FF)	Michael Joe Cosgrave (FG)
27th	1992	Michael Woods (FF)	Tommy Broughan (Lab)	Liam Fitzgerald (FF)	Seán Kenny (Lab)
28th	1997	Michael Woods (FF)	Tommy Broughan (Lab)	Martin Brady (FF)	Michael Joe Cosgrave (FG)
29th	2002	Michael Woods (FF)	Tommy Broughan (Lab)	Martin Brady (FF)	3 seats from 2002
30th	2007	Michael Woods (FF)	Tommy Broughan (Lab)	Terence Flanagan (FG)	3 seats from 2002
31st	2011	Seán Kenny (Lab)	Tommy Broughan (Lab)	Terence Flanagan (FG)	3 seats from 2002
32nd	2016	Constituency abolished. See Dublin Bay North			

Dáil	Election	Deputy (Party)	Deputy (Party)	Deputy (Party)
21st	1977	Charles Haughey (FF)	Timothy Killeen (FF)	Noël Browne (Ind.)
22nd	1981	Constituency abolished		

Dáil	Election	Deputy (Party)	Deputy (Party)	Deputy (Party)	Deputy (Party)
13th	1948	Vivion de Valera (FF)	Martin O'Sullivan (Lab)	Patrick McGilligan (FG)	3 seats 1948–1961
14th	1951	Vivion de Valera (FF)	Colm Gallagher (FF)	Patrick McGilligan (FG)	3 seats 1948–1961
15th	1954	Vivion de Valera (FF)	Maureen O'Carroll (Lab)	Patrick McGilligan (FG)	3 seats 1948–1961
16th	1957	Vivion de Valera (FF)	Colm Gallagher (FF)	Patrick McGilligan (FG)	3 seats 1948–1961
16th	1957 by-election	Vivion de Valera (FF)	Frank Sherwin (Ind.)	Patrick McGilligan (FG)	3 seats 1948–1961
17th	1961	Vivion de Valera (FF)	Frank Sherwin (Ind.)	Patrick McGilligan (FG)	Celia Lynch (FF)
18th	1965	Vivion de Valera (FF)	Michael O'Leary (Lab)	Luke Belton (FG)	Celia Lynch (FF)
19th	1969	George Colley (FF)	Michael O'Leary (Lab)	Luke Belton (FG)	Celia Lynch (FF)
20th	1973	George Colley (FF)	Michael O'Leary (Lab)	Luke Belton (FG)	Celia Lynch (FF)
21st	1977	Vincent Brady (FF)	Michael O'Leary (Lab)	Michael Keating (FG)	3 seats 1977–1981
22nd	1981	Vincent Brady (FF)	Charles Haughey (FF)	Noël Browne (SLP)	George Birmingham (FG)
23rd	1982 (Feb)	Vincent Brady (FF)	Charles Haughey (FF)	Richard Bruton (FG)	George Birmingham (FG)
24th	1982 (Nov)	Vincent Brady (FF)	Charles Haughey (FF)	Richard Bruton (FG)	George Birmingham (FG)
25th	1987	Vincent Brady (FF)	Charles Haughey (FF)	Richard Bruton (FG)	George Birmingham (FG)
26th	1989	Vincent Brady (FF)	Charles Haughey (FF)	Richard Bruton (FG)	Ivor Callely (FF)
27th	1992	Seán Haughey (FF)	Derek McDowell (Lab)	Richard Bruton (FG)	Ivor Callely (FF)
28th	1997	Seán Haughey (FF)	Derek McDowell (Lab)	Richard Bruton (FG)	Ivor Callely (FF)
29th	2002	Seán Haughey (FF)	Finian McGrath (Ind.)	Richard Bruton (FG)	Ivor Callely (FF)
30th	2007	Seán Haughey (FF)	Finian McGrath (Ind.)	Richard Bruton (FG)	3 seats from 2007
31st	2011	Aodhán Ó Ríordáin (Lab)	Finian McGrath (Ind.)	Richard Bruton (FG)	3 seats from 2007
32nd	2016	Constituency abolished. See Dublin Bay North			
