= Arms Crisis =

1970 political scandal in Ireland

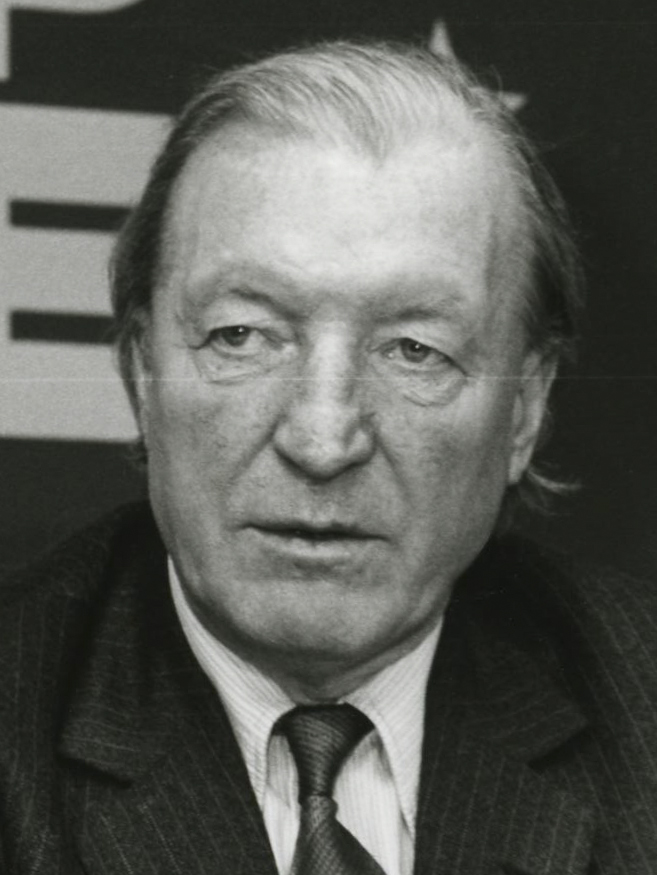
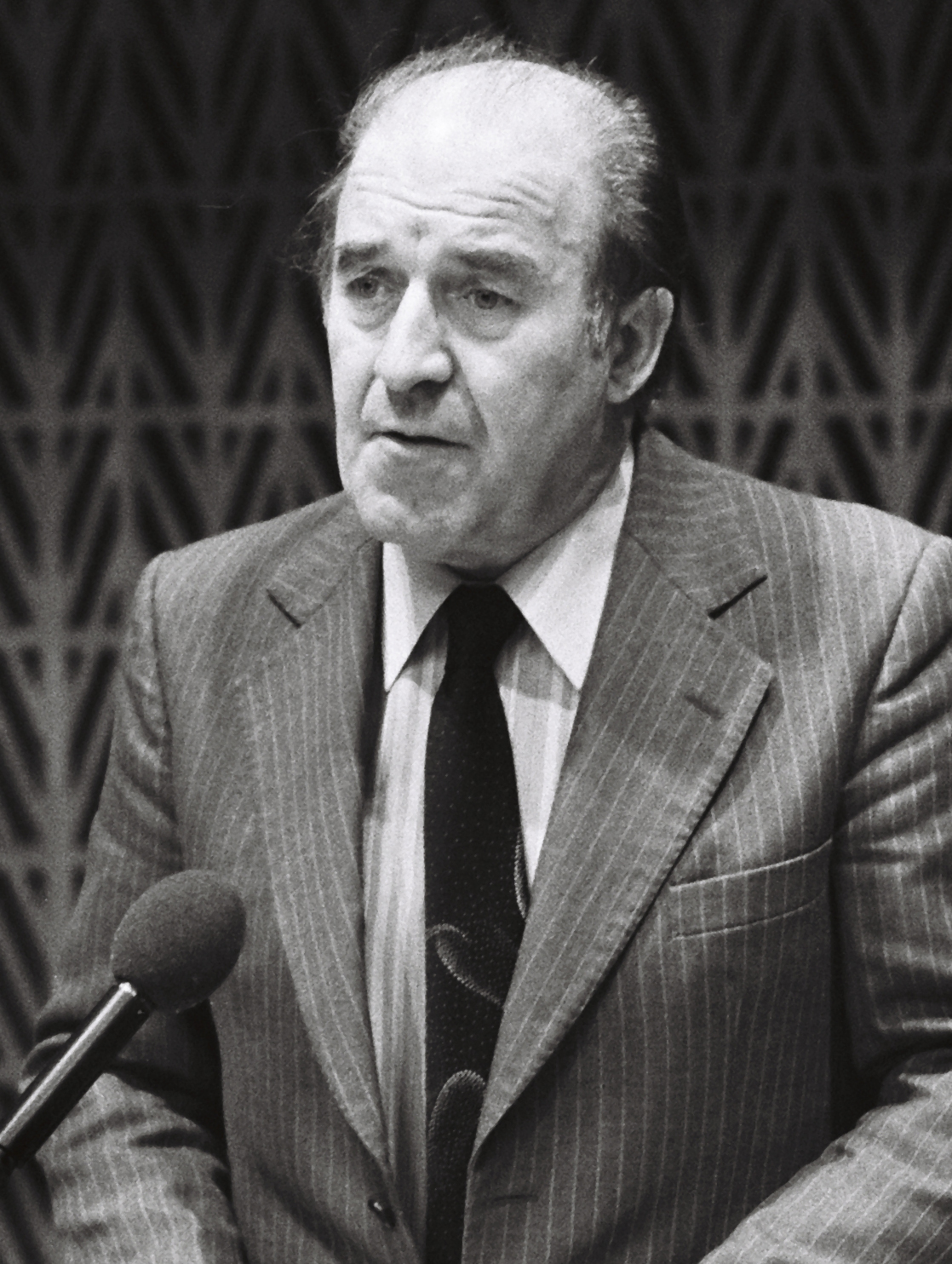
Charles Haughey, then Minister for Finance, and Neil Blaney, then Minister for Agriculture and Fisheries, centre of the crisis.

The Arms Crisis was an Irish political scandal in 1970 in which Charles Haughey and Neil Blaney were dismissed as cabinet ministers for alleged involvement in a conspiracy to smuggle arms to the Irish Republican Army in Northern Ireland. At the ensuing Arms Trial, charges against Blaney were dropped, and Haughey, along with co-defendants Captain James Kelly, John Kelly and Belgian businessman Albert Luykx, were found not guilty of conspiracy. Blaney claimed that the then government knew about the plan, while Haughey denied this.

== Background ==
The events occurred during the Fianna Fáil government of Jack Lynch. Amid the 1969 Northern Ireland riots, which would lead to the Troubles, nationalist families were being forced from their homes, and refugees "streamed over the border" into the Republic. The Dublin government established a cabinet subcommittee to organise emergency assistance and relief. Haughey, then Minister for Finance and the hardline Blaney, Minister for Agriculture and Fisheries who was from the Donegal North-East constituency bordering Northern Ireland were members of the subcommittee, along with Pádraig Faulkner and Joseph Brennan. Jack Lynch took little interest in the work of the subcommittee, and after an initial meeting, Faulkner and Brennan seem to have left their senior colleagues Haughey and Blaney to their own devices. A government fund of £100,000 was set up to provide relief to civilians forced out of their homes by the Troubles, and Haughey was given sole authority over this money.

Haughey and Blaney disapproved of the cautious policies of Taoiseach Lynch on Northern Ireland and favoured a more robust approach. In August 1969, after Blaney had proposed military intervention in Northern Ireland, Lynch had asked Irish Army Intelligence to draft proposals for limited military intervention in Northern Ireland to protect nationalist areas from Ulster loyalist mobs, known as Exercise Armageddon, but it was seen to be unworkable and was not adopted by the cabinet. The nationalist areas were given a form of protection later in August by British forces in Operation Banner, and Lynch saw this as an effective short-term measure. On 30 October 1968, Lynch had met with Harold Wilson, the prime minister of the United Kingdom, in London and had called on Britain to take steps to end the partition of Ireland.

Blaney, the then Minister of Agriculture, was an outspoken critic of government policy on Northern Ireland. In a speech in 1969 he said "the Fianna Fail party has never taken a decision to rule out the use of force if the situation in the Six Counties so demand". Haughey had not publicly opposed Lynch's policy, but was concerned about being outflanked by his Fianna Fáil leadership rival.

In October 1969, a meeting of the Northern Citizen Defence Committees, which had been set up to defend nationalist areas from unionist attack, and which included IRA officers, was held in Bailieborough, County Cavan, with Irish Army intelligence officer Captain James Kelly in attendance. Captain Kelly promised the Northern Citizen Defence Committees £50,000, that would be made available to buy weapons for defense of nationalist areas against loyalist attack.

After the Bailiebourough meeting, Kelly reported directly to Blaney, who in turn brought him to Haughey's house to give account of the meeting. Kelly suggested that the government should support the IRA, acknowledging "this would mean accepting the possibility of armed action of some sort as the ultimate solution".

Blaney allegedly made plans with Captain Kelly to import weapons from continental Europe. Haughey provided the money for the purchase from his civilian relief fund, and also made a failed attempt to arrange customs clearance for the shipment.

Haughey met with the IRA Chief of Staff Cathal Goulding. Garda Special Branch informed the Minister for Justice Mícheál Ó Móráin of this meeting and he reported it to the Cabinet, but Haughey dismissed it as a chance encounter. In November 1969, a Belfast republican leader named John Kelly, and Haughey's brother Jock, traveled to London to purchase arms, but Kelly became suspicious that their plot had been discovered and they returned to Ireland.

== Revelation and trial ==
By late April 1970, the Garda Síochána Special Branch were aware of the plot and had informed Lynch. However, Lynch took no action until the leader of the opposition, Liam Cosgrave was also informed by the Special Branch of the smuggling scheme and pressed the Taoiseach to take action. Haughey and Blaney were sacked by Lynch on 6 May when they refused to resign. Kevin Boland, the Minister for Social Welfare resigned from the government in protest at the sackings as he was adamant (as were the accused) that Jack Lynch and most of the Cabinet—in particular Jim Gibbons, then Minister for Defence—knew about the plan to import arms. The Minister for Justice, Mícheál Ó Móráin who was in hospital at the time was asked to resign on 4 May. He later claimed that he had in fact informed Lynch of the individuals involved.

On 28 May 1970, Haughey and Blaney went on trial in Dublin, together with an Irish Army intelligence officer, Captain James Kelly, John Kelly and Belgian businessman Albert Luykx, who had allegedly agreed to use his contacts to acquire the weapons. All charges against Blaney were dropped in the District Court on 2 July 1970 and as a result he was not tried, before the main trial got underway under Justice Aindrias Ó Caoimh. The trial collapsed a week later as Ó Caoimh withdrew after allegations of bias. Following a second trial, presided over by Justice Seamus Henchy, the other four defendants were cleared on 23 October.

At the trial there was a direct contradiction of evidence regarding the sanctioning of the imports between Haughey and the chief prosecutorial witness, Jim Gibbons, Minister for Defence at the time of the attempted imports. Haughey admitted arranging customs clearance for the shipment, but claimed in his defence that he did not know it consisted of weapons. This directly contradicted the evidence of Gibbons and Peter Berry that Haughey was fully aware of all the details of the conspiracy. It also contradicted the testimony of his co-defendants, who admitted that they had tried to import weapons, but maintained that the shipment had been legally authorised by the government. During the trial the judge remarked that either Haughey or Gibbons had to be committing perjury.

== Impact ==
The resignations and sackings left four vacancies in cabinet. As a result, there was a major cabinet reshuffle and some senior politicians of the future, such as Desmond O'Malley and Gerry Collins, got their first step on the ministerial ladder.

The scandal led to bitter divisions in Fianna Fáil between supporters of the sacked ministers Haughey and Blaney and supporters of Lynch. The same divisions affected government policy on Northern Ireland. Although the events led to Haughey being demoted to the back-benches, he remained a member of Fianna Fáil, while Boland was expelled in 1970 and Blaney in 1971. Blaney went on to found his own party, Independent Fianna Fáil, which re-joined Fianna Fáil in 2006, eleven years after Blaney's death. Haughey later returned to ministerial office and succeeded Lynch as party leader in 1979. There was no rapprochement in the relationship between Gibbons and Haughey and when Haughey became Taoiseach, Gibbons was dropped from his ministerial office. During a later leadership contest, Gibbons was assaulted in Dáil Éireann by Haughey supporters in retaliation for his testimony at the Arms Trial.

The events came to be one of the defining periods of Lynch's term as leader, during which there were several crises. Lynch supporters saw him as exhibiting strength in facing down the rebel ministers and his detractors saw it as an illustration of his weakness on the national question and procrastination in the face of difficult decisions.

As state papers relating to the period were released after 1995, further light was shed on the events, questioning the outcome. Much remains unknown about the truthfulness of the various personalities involved, and what exactly each knew, and when they came to know it. The diaries of Peter Berry, Secretary of the Department of Justice, published in Magill magazine, claimed that Lynch had not been forthright publicly. Documents released through the Freedom of Information Act 30 years later showed that the state had altered statements by Colonel Hefferon to suppress the fact that he and Captain Kelly had kept Gibbons informed. This caused the then Taoiseach, Bertie Ahern, to publicly state that Captain Kelly had done nothing wrong.

== See also ==
- Exercise Armageddon
