= James Kelly (Irish Army officer) =

Irish Army intelligence officer (1929–2003)

Captain James Kelly
- Kelly, c. 1968

Personal details
- Born: 16 October 1929 Bailieboro, County Cavan, Ireland
- Died: 16 July 2003 (aged 73)
- Resting place: Glasnevin Cemetery, Dublin, Ireland
- Party: Aontacht Éireann; Fianna Fáil
- Known for: Arms Trial

Military service
- Branch/service: Defence Forces
- Rank: Captain

James Kelly (16 October 1929 – 16 July 2003) was a former Irish Army intelligence officer who was found not guilty (along with two former Irish government ministers) of attempting to illegally import arms for the Provisional Irish Republican Army during the Arms Crisis of 1970.

== Early life ==
James Kelly was the eldest of ten children, born in 1929 into a staunchly Irish republican family from Bailieboro, County Cavan. His father, also named James Kelly, had stood for Sinn Féin in local Elections in 1918, topping the poll. An ancestor from the late 18th century, Robert Kelly, was a member of the United Irishmen, and was supposedly an Officer Commanding, or General, of the United Irishmen in the East Cavan/South Monaghan area. James Kelly joined the Irish Army in 1949. By 1960 he had been promoted to captain and appointed to the intelligence section at army headquarters.

== Arms Trial ==
Kelly was a central figure in the Arms Trial, having travelled to Hamburg to arrange the purchase of arms. It emerged later that Neil Blaney had ordered him to do so, but before the weapons arrived the Garda Special Branch had heard of the plan and informed the Taoiseach, Jack Lynch, aborting the importation and resulting in criminal charges for the plotters. Although in his summing-up the judge said it was no defence for Kelly to say that he believed that the government had authorised the importation of arms, Kelly was acquitted.

Although he was acquitted, Kelly suffered financially because he had felt compelled to resign from the Army even before the prosecution was brought. He printed and published a personal memoir in paperback format called Orders for the Captain? in 1971.

Kelly never denied that he had been involved in extra-legal arms purchase talks, but contended that he had been ordered to do so by some ministers. A typical version of the events is found in a 1993 hostile biography of Charles Haughey, claiming: "As early as October 1969, to the certain knowledge of Charles Haughey, James Gibbons, the Department of Justice, the Special Branch and Army Intelligence, there were meetings with leading members of the IRA, when they were promised money and arms. The critical encounter took place in Bailieborough [sic], County Cavan, on Saturday, 4 October 1969. It had been arranged by Captain James Kelly, an army intelligence officer, and Cathal Goulding. Kelly, at that stage, was already the subject of several security reports to the Secretary of the Department of Justice, Peter Berry, from the Special Branch, implicating Kelly with subversives and with promises of money and of arms." Kelly never objected to such versions of the events of 1969.

== Political life ==
Following the Arms Trial, Kelly joint-founded Aontacht Éireann, a political party directly born out of the scandal. He was elected vice-chairman of the party and stood in Dáil elections for them unsuccessfully in Cavan–Monaghan on two occasions in 1973 and 1977. Aontacht Éireann met with little success at the polls and by 1980 he had joined Fianna Fáil, becoming a member of its national executive. Following the first applications of the 1987 Extradition (European Convention on the Suppression of Terrorism) Act, he resigned from the party in 1989 in opposition to the extradition of Provisional IRA prisoners to the United Kingdom. He also served twice as President of the 1916-1921 Club.

Kelly was heavily involved in the Peace Process. In 1989 he published his own draft on how a Peace Process could proceed. His document called The Courage of the Brave was launched in Conway Mill, Belfast on 24 August 1989. Present on the platform party at the launch of the document were, Fianna Fáil Councillor Macarten McCormack, Mr Ernest Cowan, Chairman of Kentstown Fianna Fáil who had served with Captain Kelly on the Fianna Fáil National Executive, Robert C Linnon, National President, Irish American Unity Conference, Kate Lavery, representing John J Finucane, National President, American Irish Political Education Committee and Father Des Wilson of Belfast.

He launched a successful defamation case against Garret FitzGerald over an article in The Irish Times. He died in 2003 and is buried in Glasnevin Cemetery in Dublin. The epitaph on his grave is "Put not your trust in princes", "...that was a quote from Machiavelli" Suzanne Kelly (Capt. James Kellys daughter) stated in TV3s The Rise and Fall of Fianna Fáil in 2011
