= Carey Clarke =

Irish academic figurative painter

Carey Clarke (born 1936) is an Irish academic figurative painter, known for his landscapes, interiors, still lifes and portraits.

== Biography ==
Carey Clarke was born in Donegal in 1936 as the only child of Protestant, middle-class parents. He was educated at St Andrew's College in Dublin, and from 1954 to 1959 attended The National College of Art there, with further studies at the Salzburg Summer school of Fine Art under Emilio Vedova (1969), with Annigoni in Florence (1976–77) and at Slade School in London (1991).

He taught at the National College of Art and Design from 1959 to 1995, where his emphasis on painterly craft and observation had a profound influence on several generations of younger painters. Clarke was appointed to a full-time teaching position in 1968, and to the college's first Academic Council in 1969, in the midst of a student rebellion demanding more freedom for self-expression and a relaxation of academic discipline. Perceived as a conservative, he became a target for hostility by avant-garde elements within the college, who (according to Clarke) made it difficult for him to teach there. Artist Robert Armstrong (who came to NCAD as a student in 1969 and subsequently taught at the college) has described how students "were almost forced" to take sides:

"There were certain staff members, like Alice Hanratty and Charlie Cullen who represented the avant garde, and there were the John Kellys and Carey [Clarke] and Brett McEntagart, who were associated with the RHA, who were regarded as the enemy ... it became very bitter, very unpleasant. There were a lot of casualties along the way."

Despite these difficulties, Clarke continued to teach at NCAD, upholding a traditional approach to observational drawing and painting where possible, and remained long enough to influence younger artists (among them Mick O'Dea, Joe Dunne, Maeve McCarthy, James Hanley, Geraldine O'Neill and Conor Walton) less hostile to academic tradition. According to Shirley Armstrong Duffy "Clarke has been a vital link between academic tradition and its current exploitation and reinterpretation" by younger artists.

An associate of the Royal Hibernian Academy from 1967, Clarke was elected full member in 1981 and served as President of that institution from 1992 - 1996. He is also a member of the Watercolour Society of Ireland and the Cork Arts Society.

Principally a painter of landscapes, interiors and still lifes, Carey Clarke is also regarded as one of Ireland's finest portraitists and has painted many leading politicians, academics, artists and other well-known Irish figures, among them former Taoiseach Garret FitzGerald, former Taoiseach Albert Reynolds, former Lord Mayor of Dublin Michael Mulcahy, playwright Tom Murphy and artist Mick O'Dea. Clarke remains active as a painter, with an exhibition of recent portraits at the RHA in 2017 marking his eightieth year.

== Technique and aesthetic ==
Whether working in oil paint, tempera, watercolour or graphite, Carey Clarke's work is always slowly and patiently constructed, his technique highly controlled and meticulous, aiming at realism and classical balance. According to James Hanley "His work is all about the perception and analysis of reality, and the ability to then translate that experience into the exquisite language of paint." Aidan Dunne has written that "even when he is depicting southern locations bathed in warm Mediterranean light, Clarke’s yen for absolute control and endlessly refined detail lends a certain chilly quality to the genuine appeal of his work." According to Clarke himself, "My work is clearly realistic. Nevertheless I sometimes transcend this obsessiveness with realism and create the occasional image that is imbued with lyrical feeling."

According to Conor Walton, Carey Clarke excels "in virtuoso painterly transcriptions of the most complex interplay of light and matter, such as beams of sunlight entering a space, dramatically hitting objects, bouncing off or passing through to create first a dramatic pattern, then a symphonic array of delicately coloured reflections. They are – literally – transient moments of stillness and illumination."

== Critical appreciation ==
Irish Times critic Aidan Dunne has describes Clarke as "one of the most popular and respected of Ireland's established academic artists, and deservedly so." Brian Sewell described him as "among [the] keepers of the academic faith." Bruce Arnold declared him "a master of his craft and art, revered as a teacher, admired as a painter and loved as a friend." According to Cristín Leach Hughes,

"Contemporary reaction to Clarke’s work may hinge on questions of taste and fashion, but realism is enjoying a revival among younger, more conceptual painters than Clarke. The fact that he is still painting and passing his skills on to the next generation means the Irish art world continues to be that bit richer."

James Hanley has written of Clarke's "remarkable body of work that is of the best of the European classical tradition, in portraiture, still life, landscape and interiors, and Irish in his commitment to the landscape of his native place – making him the continuum, of Osborne, Orpen and Keating, Hennessy and McGonigal", and also of his "enormous contribution" as a teacher: " ... using a timeless language, relevant to any painter, of any time, he taught students to understand design, tone, pictorial harmonies, composition, structure, planes, figure to ground, taste and refinements of aesthetics in the execution of a style." Mick O'Dea, former President of the Royal Hibernian Academy, offers this evaluation of Carey Clarke's work and his position in the history of Irish art:

"Carey Clarke follows his vision, and he will have a corpus of work that will transcend any decade, particularly as part of the continuity of that Orpen tradition, which was so derided even when I was at college ... I think there is a line going back to Ingres, from Orpen to Keating to Clarke, and on to the present generation such as myself. So there is a continuous line. I think he was holding that line when it was being most assaulted, and it was looking a hopeless cause."

Shirley Armstrong Duffy argues that "Carey Clarke has largely been ignored by art historians and critics alike, because of his reputation as an academic and a conservative at a time when traditions were being subverted" and that his achievement is ripe for reappraisal.

== Awards ==
- 1959 Taylor Art Competition, Royal Dublin Society, prizewinner
- 1985 ESB Keating McLoughlin Medal
- 1986 Open Award, Arnotts National Portrait Competition
- 2008 Ireland-U.S. Council Portrait Prize

== Solo exhibitions ==
- 1966 Molesworth Gallery, Dublin, Ireland
- 1972 Winged Arts Gallery, Sedona, Arizona, USA
- 1973 Emmet Gallery, Dublin
- 1987 Grafton Gallery, Dublin
- 1990 The Solomon Gallery, Dublin
- 2012, Retrospective Exhibition, Royal Hibernian Academy, Dublin
- 2017, 'Portraits', Royal Hibernian Academy, Dublin
- 2023, ‘Coming Home: A Selection of Paintings by Carey Clarke’, Glebe Gallery, Letterkenny, Co. Donegal
