= Michael Pearce (artist) =

English painter

"Traveler", Oil on Canvas by Michael Pearce.

Michael Pearce (born 1965) is an English, California-based figurative painter and author.

== Personal life ==
Since 1990 Pearce has lived in California, having left Los Angeles to move to Thousand Oaks in 2008, he is now a Ventura County resident. He is married to art historian Aihua Zhou.

== Life and work ==
Michael J. Pearce was born in Lincolnshire, England, in 1965. He is a figurative painter and an outspoken proponent of what he terms "skill-based art".

Writing for KCET, Sarah Linn describes Pearce's painting as "[m]assive, mythical and brimming with allegorical subtext [. . . that] demonstrate a subtle alchemy all their own -- the transformation of ordinary oil paint and canvas into narratives that embrace the magic and romance of an earlier era." "Much of Pearce’s art is figurative and allegorical. He uses oil paint to transform canvases into stories that embrace the magic and romance of an earlier era. He uses conceptual themes that capture his audience by encouraging their individual imaginative interpretation of the events he has painted. There’s meaning here — a reconstruction of ideas bigger than self — that makes these paintings feel greater than their already large size." The works are marked by the use of symbolism, male and female imagery and celestial references to address the mystical relationship between man and God. They are "a beguiling mix of old-school technique and fresh narrative possibility".

Pearce paints in oils on canvas, sometimes stretched over a wooden panel, creating allegorical or narrative figurative compositions of mystical or alchemical subjects. His installation work was typically made from simple materials like wood, greenware clay and beeswax, and was sourced from prehistory and alchemy. Speaking about his 2008 The Principle installation, Pearce said: "Alchemical imagery is so rich and mysterious that it can't fail to be exciting to an artist." In 2009 he combined actual alchemical experimentation with his artwork, showing his Cabinet of Alchemical Wonders in an exhibit in Glendale, California, including a reflux still within the centre of a large glowing tree. His body of work connects him to his study of natural philosophy, an area he explored when studying early archaeological texts by William Stukeley and John Aubrey, whose eclectic writings led him to explore alchemical symbolism, steering the direction of his work toward mystical allegory.

After 2008, Pearce became solely interested in oil painting, and began work on a series of new allegorical figurative works. The first of the group was exhibited in August 2011 at California Lutheran University in an exhibit titled "The New Romantic Figure", with prominent Californian artists including Alexey Steele, Jeremy Lipking, Tony Pro, Mia Tavonatti, Cyn McCurry, Peter Adams (President of the California Art Club) and Michael Lynn Adams. Looking back to the past for inspiration in his 2012 exhibit "Emblemata" he used 15th-century emblem books and tarot cards as source material, and presented art historical lectures on the Magician and the Fool archetypes. Many of the paintings were presented in dramatic tabernacle frames that replicated those found on 19th Century Pre-Raphaelite works, whose wet-white painting methods he researched and used in the production of some of the canvases. Although he uses Victorian and Renaissance studio techniques, he is determinedly contemporary, saying: "We can't be painting for the 19th century - we have to paint for the 21st century...."

=== Love ===
In 2015, he painted a new group of 15 paintings called "Love", which caught the attention of writer David Molesky, who published an interview with him in Juxtapoz Magazine. Pearce described the paintings as "figures emerging from light", and said that he was writing another book "exploring the ideas of kitsch and sentiment" tentatively titled "Never Nothing".

=== The Secret Paintings ===
Pearce created a series of large-scale paintings which draw from alchemical symbolism, allegorical imagery and themes from 15th-century emblem books and tarot cards. In June 2017 these paintings, along with Pearce's series The Grail Watchers, began a tour crossing the mainland United States. The Secret Paintings opening reception was held at the Museum of Ventura County 2 June 2017. Holly Moye of Oklahoma City University's Hulsey Gallery said: "The Secret Paintings strike a chord for a new kind of art moving forward from the weary pessimism that has dominated international art for the past century." Art commentator Joseph Bravo said, "He’s reinventing representational art for the 21st century, and he brings as much concept to bear as any post-modern contemporary artist would do..." Ten of Pearce's Secret Paintings are in the collection of the Philosophical Research Society, Los Angeles.

== Author ==
Pearce is author of books about art and aesthetics. His Kitsch, Propaganda, and the American Avant-Garde is a history of the avant-garde, tracking its development as proto-communist propaganda in revolutionary France to its 20th century incarnation as propaganda for American liberal democracy. His Art in the Age of Emergence "delivers sensible emergent aesthetics, explaining the processes that happen in human minds when we share ideas as works of art, skewering the orthodoxies of contemporary art with pragmatic wisdom about why representational art thrives in the new millennium."

In 2019 Pearce began writing articles about the need for a new art criticism that dealt with the issues interesting conservatives in 21st-century representational art, arguing that post-modern culture had eliminated the avant-garde hegemony and created a bubble-bath of multiple art-worlds, each with their own gatekeepers and criticism.

In winter 2019 he began writing regularly for MutualArt magazine, producing articles about art, focusing mostly on representational painters. He has also written articles for American Fine Art, Fine Art Connoisseur, Quillette, American Art Collector, Artists on Art, Combustus and Postmodern Times. His piece about the artist Dino Valls is the most read article on the Combustus website.

== Academic life ==
Pearce is Professor of Figurative Drawing and Painting at California Lutheran University in Thousand Oaks, California. In 2010, he introduced an atelier-style system to the CLU Art Department, in which each faculty member was provided with their own studio space on campus, welcoming their students to study alongside them as they lead by example in the production of their own work. He served as Chair of the Art Department between 2008 and 2013.

Between 2005 and 2016, Pearce was curator of CLU's Kwan Fong Gallery where his programming emphasized the work of representational artists and interdisciplinary exhibits.

In December 2014, the California Art Club named Pearce "Man of the Year" and presented him with the William & Julia Bracken Wendt Award for his service to representational art.

He is a graduate of Dartington College of Arts, 1990, BA (Hons) Theatre; The University of Southern California, 1992 MFA Theatrical Design; and Plymouth University, 2008, PhD Using Prehistoric British Art and Architecture as a Model for Contemporary Art.

== The Representational Art Conference ==
By 2012, his enthusiasm for skill-based studio technique led to collaboration with his friend Michael Lynn Adams to organize The Representational Art Conference, which examined the role of representational art in the 21st century, seeking to address a "neglect of critical appreciation of representational art well out of proportion to its quality and significance". The conference was planned as a focused but non-doctrinaire event, of serious academic standards. Pearce described the reason for producing the conference: "Until we did TRAC, there were literally no conferences at all about representational art – which is a strange absence, because there was then and is now a huge amount of representational art, and a very large community of people who are interested in representational art. It seemed like a big gap that needed filling." At TRAC2012 Jed Perl and John Nava were keynote speakers, while major figures in the American Representational Art scene gave presentations and demonstrations, including former USC Dean of Art Ruth Weisberg, artists Tony Pro, David Kassan, Graydon Parrish, Jeremy Lipking, Sadie Valeri, Richard T. Scott, Alexey Steele, Art Historian Vern Swanson and author Virgil Elliot. In Art LTD magazine, John Seed described the event as "a 149-year-later 'Salon Des Refuses'". Pearce edited the papers from the 2012 conference in a volume published in 2013 as The Real Snake: Proceedings of the Representational Art Conference 2012.

By 2014, The Representational Art Conference almost tripled in size and included keynote addresses by Roger Scruton and Juliette Aristides. The artist Odd Nerdrum served on a panel with Roger Scruton to discuss the aesthetics of contemporary representational art. In his Huffington Post review John Seed said: "...a genuine movement is taking shape". Pearce edited the papers from the 2014 conference in a volume published in 2015 as "Kitsch & Beauty: Proceedings of the Representational Art Conference 2014".

Pearce chaired a third installment of The Representational Art Conference which took place November 1–4, 2015 in Ventura, CA. with keynote speeches by Boston Museum of Fine Art curator Elliot Davis, Fred Ross of the Art Renewal Center, neuroscientist Semir Zeki and sculptor Richard MacDonald. Artist F. Scott Hess described some his experiences of the event in a Huffington Post article titled "Art That Hurts". Selections of the conference papers, again edited by Pearce, were published as As It Is: Proceedings of the Representational Art Conference 2015.

The fourth TRAC was held in 2017 in Miami, Florida, in association with the Figurative Art Convention and Exposition (FACE) organized by Fine Art Connoisseur magazine. It featured addresses by philosopher Stephen Hicks, editor Peter Trippi, and art commentator Joseph Bravo.

In 2018, TRAC became an international event, taking place in the World Trade Center, Leeuwarden, Netherlands, Europe's 2018 City of Culture. Hosted by Sir Tom Hageman of the Classical Academy, Pearce was keynote speaker, alongside Rembrandt expert Ernst van de Wettering, painter Odd Nerdrum, education expert Mandy Theis of the Da Vinci Initiative, and author Corinna Wagner. Plans were laid for TRAC to return to California in 2019.

The sixth TRAC was held in Ventura, California, in Spring 2019, under the header "Imagine." Keynote addresses came from: the artist Roger Dean, famed for his paintings and album cover designs, many of which were used in the movie "Avatar;" Dr. Corinna Wagner, who had previously spoke at TRAC, spoke again, this time about the imagined body; the Chinese-American painter Z. S. Liang, who paints imagery from the old west, described his work and its place in American art; Tim Jenison spoke about his research into Vermeer. As part of the conference, Pearce organized an exhibit of imaginative realism titled "The Illusionists," featuring paintings and sculptures by Julie Bell, Roger Dean, Kathiucia Dias, Mark Gleason, F. Scott Hess, Regina Jacobson, Guy Kinnear, Brad Kunkle, Bryan Larsen, Richard MacDonald, Mark Poole, Vince Natale, Boris Vallejo, Conor Walton, Pamela Wilson, and Sandra Yagi. A video was produced placing imaginative realism into its historical context.

== Theatrical design ==
Pearce worked in Southern Californian theatre as a scenic and lighting designer, winning a 1992 Drama-Logue Award for his lighting of Brian Friel's Translations at the Celtic Arts Center, Los Angeles, and an Independent Theatre Award for his set and lighting designs for a Santa Barbara, CA, production of Frankenstein in 2004. He was a member of Santa Barbara’s experimental Lit Moon Theatre Company, as the company's lighting designer for their award-winning production of Hamlet.

In 1992, Pearce designed the set for comedian and raconteur Steve Allen’s production of his play The Wake at the Celtic Arts Center in Hollywood, Los Angeles; Los Angeles Times reviewer Tim McCulloh said: "Pearce's set and lighting are exemplary, giving the feeling one could walk into the Scanlon apartment and live there."

While working on the set for The Wake, he also was busy with the set design for Be Bop a Lula, a rock and roll play about Gene Vincent and Eddie Cochran, produced by Adam Ant and John Densmore of The Doors, starring Donal Logue.

== Portraits ==
Pearce developed a curious relationship with the aviator Amelia Earhart who appeared as the subject of several alchemical paintings. He believes that Earhart perfectly represents the element of air "as a modern Icarus" and he has painted her as an angelic character and alchemical queen. In these roles, Earhart acts to transform other characters in Pearce's romantic allegorical narratives.

Pearce has painted portraits for artists and musicians including actor Shane Brolly, members of the band Plexi, Skinny Puppy singer Nivek Ogre, Snoop Dogg and the No Limit Records rappers C-Murder, Silkk the Shocker and Master P.

Pearce's portrait of C-Murder was used for the cover of the rapper's platinum-selling The Truest Shit I Ever Said.

His portraits of rapper Master P can be seen in an MTV Cribs episode featuring the No Limit Records owner's home in Baton Rouge.
