= Patrick Gallagher (businessman) =

Irish businessman

- Born: 8 May 1951; Dublin, Ireland
- Died: 15 March 2006 (aged 54); Dublin, Ireland
- Occupation: Property developer
- Spouse: Sue Craigie (m. 1970, separated)
- Children: 2
- Father: Matt Gallagher

Patrick Gallagher (8 May 1951 – 15 March 2006) was an Irish property developer and businessperson.

== Early life and family ==
Patrick Gallagher was born in Holles Street hospital, Dublin on 8 May 1951. His parents were Matt and Helena Patricia Gallagher (née Sheeran). He had four sisters and two brothers, Danny, Delia, Maureen, Helen, Paul and Kathryn. As a child, he lived at the family home, Hollywood Rath, Mulhuddart, County Dublin. His father was one of the largest property developers in the country, and as Gallagher's older brother had Down Syndrome, he was in line to succeed his father as the head of his business, the Gallagher Group. Gallagher attended a number of secondary schools including St Gerard's in Bray, County Wicklow, Clongowes Wood College in County Kildare, and Blackrock College in County Dublin.

He married Sue Craigie in 1970, and they had two sons, Matthew and Patrick. They lived in Ballymacarney House on the Mulhuddart estate from 1973.

== Early career ==
At age 17 Gallagher joined the Gallagher Group, starting as a tea boy, before working as a plasterer, plumber and bricklayer. By 1971, he was head of house sales during the wider Irish housing boom. After the sudden death of his father in January 1974, Gallagher became the head of the Gallagher Group at age 22. Along with the main business, he also inherited a stud farm, a shopping centre, a building society, a builder's providers company, and two small banks. He also inherited his father's network of political and business allies, in particular Charles Haughey and John Byrne, who both mentored him in those years immediately after his father's death. As his inheritance was held in trusts on the Cayman Islands it was exempt from estate tax, but the Gallagher Group was not protected. The failure of Gallagher and the business was anticipated, but he saved the business by laying off staff and selling off a large portion of the land his father had accrued. He reconstituted the Gallagher Group board in March 1975, with new, younger board members. Gallagher became known for his high-flying lifestyle in the most exclusive restaurants, bars and nightclubs of Dublin, being driven around by a chauffeur in a Rolls-Royce. He mixed business with leisure, often conducting meetings in hotel bars. In 1977 Gallagher had a cancer scare, but this appeared to fuel his excessive lifestyle.

He came under pressure from the Central Bank to divest his two banks, Merchant Banking Ltd and Merchant Banking (Northern Ireland) Ltd, of all their almost exclusive investments in the Gallagher Group. In 1977 he reduced Merchant Banking's activities significantly. While it continued to lend to the Gallagher Group, it also operated from an office in his shopping centre in Donaghmede where it received small deposits from local shoppers. Between 1977 and 1978 Merchant Banking (Northern Ireland) doubled its deposit base to £1.19 million, and it was transferred to the ownership of another Gallagher company in April 1978, removing it from the regulatory oversight of the Central Bank. This allowed it to lend freely to the Gallagher Group. Gallagher's building society, the O'Connell Benefit, was also growing fast, with the Gallagher family having 4 of the 7 board seats. When the funds of Merchant Banking waned, the O'Connell Benefit was directed by Gallagher to deposit amounts of £250,000 to £500,000 in the bank.

While Ireland experienced a recession from 1974 to 1976, Gallagher built homes for the higher end of the market, selling off large greenfield sites outside of Dublin which were earmarked for low-cost building, whilst then buying smaller sites near to more up-market and established suburbs. Unlike the semi-detached homes in large estates his father built, Gallagher built bungalows with large gardens in small estates where the houses had a less uniform appearance. His developments were bolstered by very positive coverage in the property pages of both The Irish Times and Irish Independent, with the editor of the property section of the latter later admitting that Gallagher paid them for the coverage. To further maximise his profits, Gallagher would buy up large sites, secure planning permission for development, and then sell them on as smaller parcels to smaller builders and developers. He would then offer them finance from Merchant Banking with a phased payment scheme, only requiring repayment on completion. Alongside this, he also had marketing and architectural services, and would take on the development of housing estate amenities including parks and roads. This resulted in the Gallagher Group moving away from construction almost exclusively to property speculation by 1977.

Gallagher continued the relationship his father had cultivated with the leading planner in Dublin, George Redmond, giving him regular large payments and paying for family holidays. The Gallaghers were both Fianna Fáil supporters and donors, but Gallagher had allies in other political parties. In March 1977, Gallagher had lost the right to final appeal on a permission to build 500 houses in Malahide, it was James Tully, the Labour Party minister for local government, who granted him permission despite strong local opposition. Gallagher would often disregard the planning process entirely, instructing his contractors to build before planning permission was approved. His developments often ignored conditions laid down by planners, and Gallagher would also fail to provide amenities such as footpaths and green spaces in his housing estates while still charging ground rent to the new homeowners. The Gallagher Group became notorious for proceeding against and seeking jail sentences for homeowners who did not pay the ground rent due.

His new business model of residential development allowed him to free up large amounts of capital, which he directed towards office developments. When Rohan Ltd invested £500,000 in the Gallagher Group in 1976, these funds were directed towards purchasing land in Dublin city. Spurred on by the election of a Fianna Fáil government in 1977, and the expansion of the public sector brought in a new surge in demand for office space in Dublin. The government chose not to build its own offices, instead suspended the capital levy on office developments and encouraged certain developers to build the office facilities that the government would then lease long-term. Gallagher concentrated on sites in Dublin 2, focusing on the St Stephen's Green area. The Gallagher Group was instrumental in the demolition of a number of historic buildings in the area's Georgian and Victorian core, and replaced them with unsympathetic, modern office blocks in which he was fiercely opposed by preservationists. Like his father, Gallagher worked with Desmond Fitzgerald on these developments. Older buildings that Gallagher owned were often left open to the weather, and there were a number of suspicious accidents that damaged them beyond repair.

One of his most notorious developments was on Molesworth and Dawson Streets, when in 1978 he demolished a series of Georgian and Victorian buildings. Two of the most notable buildings razed were St Ann's School and Molesworth Hall which were designed by Thomas Newenham Deane and Benjamin Woodward. Architectural students occupied St Ann's School in an attempt to delay its demolition, and Gallagher responded with a press conference announcing that he would lay off 300 workers across the city if the occupation was not ended. This led to counter demonstration from the construction workers, and ultimately a high court injunction ordering the squatters to be evicted, which Gallagher did forcibly. The injunction was obtained on the grounds that the school could collapse at any moment, but the building had to be demolished by hand when the bulldozers failed to demolish it. He built an office block designed by Fitzgerald, which he later sold at a profit of £2-3 million to a pension fund. Through rapid turnover, Gallagher spent an estimated £45 million between 1976 and 1982. He would occasionally appear to have over reached, but would save himself by closing a large sale when most in need of cash. One such occasion was when he had purchased Sean Lemass House (formerly St Vincent's Hospital) on St Stephen's Green for £5 million, he sold it 7 months later to the Irish Permanent Building Society for £7.5 million in December 1979. He had only paid a £500,000 deposit. Gallagher was a friend of the Irish Permanent's chief executive, but he later denied he had been bribed to pay more than it was worth.

Given his track record, a number of large banks backed Gallagher, including the Northern Bank Finance Corporation (NBFC). An executive of NBFC sat on the board of the Gallagher Group and flagrantly broke Central Bank rules by lending over 5% of its total advances to Gallagher. It was this support that allowed Gallagher to outbid all his competitors in purchasing sites, paying more than market value. It also allowed him to offer very generous payment schedules to the builders who bought land off him for residential development, and flipping commercial sites before purchase payments were due, allowed Gallagher to hold a large debt burden with a relatively small cash flow in comparison.

His success was attributed, in part, to the rise of Haughey's political prominence. He continued to donate to Fianna Fáil, while giving Haughey annual payments of £2,000 to £3,000 and free use of his company cars. He facilitated the purchase of a house by Haughey's daughter with loans from Merchant Banking to companies controlled by Haughey in 1976. These loans from Merchant Banking were often used as gifts, with no expectation of repayment. In December 1979, when Haughey was elected taoiseach, Gallagher was the only non-politician beside Haughey during his first press conference. The following day, Gallagher was informed by Haughey that he owed over £1 million to Allied Irish Banks and he requested £750,000 be paid towards the debt. Agreeing to pay £300,000, this transaction was concealing the fact that this was a non-refundable deposit for land which Haughey would later sell to the Gallagher Group in 1984. However, there was no intention that this sale would ever take place.

Gallagher invested in racehorses, including £4 million in the bloodstock market, and participating in the racing and breeding syndicate at Coolmore. This led to a loss of £200,000 with the loss of Try My Best at the English 2,000 Guineas, leading to Gallagher selling all but £50,000 of his interests. In a partnership with 2 others, Gallagher bought Phoenix Park racecourse in 1980, and started a redevelopment. Gallagher continued to spend large amount of money personally, including £200,000 on improving Ballymacarney House before he purchased Straffan House on its 300-acre estate in 1979 for £1 million. He then spent another £1 million renovating it over 3 years. During this time he ignored the gallery that his father had promised to the Royal Hibernian Academy, which had come to a halt in 1975. Instead, he used the site on Ely Place as a storage yard for his other building sites. In 1981, he paid the £1.5 million ransom for his friend Ben Dunne after his kidnapping by the IRA, which was later repaid.

== Gallagher Group collapse ==
The Irish economy began to falter under high interest rates from 1980, and for the first time Gallagher's properties were not rising in value to compensate for the interest on his debts. Gallagher responded by taking on a number of ill-advised and ambitious projects, despite warnings from other including Haughey. He bought a 330-acre site at Fortunestown for low-cost residential development, but could not find any builders to develop it. In an attempt to stimulate cash flow, he built a high-end shopping centre on St Stephen's Green, the Galleria and started on the redevelopment of Phoenix Park racecourse, against the advice of his bankers. The Galleria struggled to find tenants, and the racecourse ran over budget, costing £2 million over the year from 1981 to 1982. As his debts mounted, Gallagher relied on the O'Connell Benefit, taking out large sums and taking longer to repay. When his demand of £1 million was denied by the society's board of directors in 1981, Gallagher lost control of O'Connell Benefit. Merchant Banking (Northern Ireland), now called Merbro, had been transferring such large amounts to Merchant Banking in Dublin that in March 1972, the Bank of England revoked its licence. Undeterred, Gallagher bought the 4.5-acre Slazenger site on St Stephen's Green, the largest commercial property site in Dublin that would later become Stephen's Green Shopping Centre, acquiring the site for £50,000 in cash with the agreement that he would take on the Slazenger's debts of £10 million. Irish Life Assurance company had indicated it would pay £16 million for the site in 1981 if the outstanding planning and lease problems could be resolved by Gallagher. Gallagher wrongly assumed he had a legal agreement with Irish Life, and proceeded to buy a 4-acre Earlsfort Terrace site in January 1982 for £9.5 million with plans of selling it to a British institution.

Gallagher struggled to resolve leasing issues with the Slazenger site, making some progress before he was stymied by one tenant with a strong legal case. In face of this, Irish Life backed out of the purchase, and later the British institution also reneged on the purchase of the site at Earlsfort Terrace after issues with planning permission. With the Irish recession beginning to take hold, and public opinion against the government, one minister conceded that many of the regulations and taxes on property development had been designed to benefit developers such as Gallagher. In an attempt to save his business, Gallagher made a bid to buy the successful supermarket chain, H. Williams, but delays resulted in the sellers realising Gallagher's perilous financial situation. Gallagher sold off many personal assets, and proposed the sale of the Phoenix Park racecourse to his partners, but the banks did not agree to restructure Gallagher's debts. This resulted in him accumulating £100,000 in interest charges alone every week.

The Gallagher Group was placed in receivership on 29 April 1982, owing £30 million to banks such as Bank of Ireland and AIB, and £20 million to other creditors. Gallagher blamed the bankers for acting too swiftly, and he maintained that his assets were worth £60 million, double their real £26 million. Straffan House was repossessed by the banks just 3 weeks after Gallagher had moved in, along with his stud farm, horses worth £2 million, and his Rolls-Royce. Gallagher's brother, Paul, had to vacate Castle Howard, and his mother forfeited his home, Dolanstown House. Gallagher assisted the receiver for a year. The Dublin property market faltered under the burden of the fallout from Gallagher's bankruptcy, including all of the smaller creditors that went under following the Gallagher Group collapse. O'Connell Benefit survived, but both Merchant Banking and Merbro were liquidated, having lent 80% of their assets to the Gallagher Group, leading to many savers losing their money as the Irish government did not cover the losses of Merchant Banking. The liquidator's report, released in 1984, showed that the Gallagher family, as well as associates, had accrued more than £250,000 in fictitious loans, and a wider fraud investigation was instigated.

== Later life and death ==
In partnership with his brother Paul, Gallagher attempted to restart his career in property development in 1983, securing finances from small banks. This was owing to a group of friends, Tony O'Reilly, P. V. Doyle, Byrne, and his uncle Charles, paying Gallagher's living expenses and guaranteeing his loans. He moved to London in 1984, where he bought flats which he refurbished and sold on, and by 1987 he could afford Balsoon House on 31 acres at Bective, County Meath, where he lived at the weekends. Gallagher was arrested in March 1988 by the British police following a fraud investigation into the management of Merbro Ltd, he was later bailed. He pleaded guilty in Belfast crown court in November 1989. His sentencing was postponed if he agreed to compensate the depositors, and while he made an initial payment of £500,000 but was unable to pay the further £500,000 with the agreed 11 months. He was imprisoned from October 1990 to October 1991. In June 1990, the Irish director of public prosecutions received a report recommending the Gallagher be charged with fraud in relation to the management of Merchant Banking Ltd, but it was decided not to pursue the charges. The depositors of the bank took a high court civil action against Gallagher, resulting in a settlement in 1996 of an undisclosed sum.

When he was released from prison, Gallagher separated from his wife, and immigrated to Zimbabwe. There he bought a farm and was involved in a scheme to settle Afrikaner farmers which was abandoned. He then moved to South Africa, and was involved in a number of failed investment schemes across Africa. In 1998, he confirmed that he paid Haughey money, and gave evidence to the Moriarty tribunal in 1999 on the matter. He denied he received any favours in return, and remained friendly with Haughey. He suffered with poor health, and his friends paid for his medical expenses. He divided his time between Dublin and Cape Town. Gallagher died on 15 March 2006 in Dublin, and is buried at Three-Mile-Water cemetery, County Wicklow. He was survived by his partner, Yvonne D'Arcy.
