= O'Connell Bridge House =

Office building in Dublin (Ireland)

- Teach Droichid Uí Chonaill
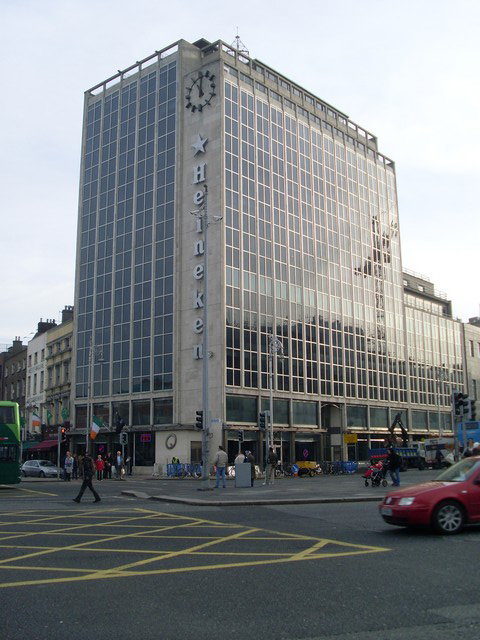

- Location within Central Dublin
- Alternative names: Heineken Building
- Etymology: Named after O'Connell Bridge

General information
- Status: Topped-out
- Architectural style: Modernist
- Location: 2 D'Olier Street, Dublin, Ireland
- Coordinates: 53.346841°N 6.258253°W
- Topped-out: 1965
- Cost: IR£1 million

Height
- Height: 41.45 m (136.0 ft)

Technical details
- Floor count: 12
- Floor area: 75,000 sq ft (7,000 m^{2})

Design and construction
- Architect: Desmond FitzGerald
- Developer: John Byrne

Other information
- Parking: none

O'Connell Bridge House is a 12-storey office block in Dublin, Ireland.

== History ==
O'Connell Bridge House was built on the site of Carlisle House, which was built in 1779 and demolished in 1962. O'Connell Bridge House was completed in 1964 and opened in 1965. It was built by John Byrne at a cost of 1 million Irish pounds, after he purchased the site for £53,000 in 1961. Byrne's company, the Carlisle Trust, which developed this site was managed by Des Traynor. Upon opening in January 1965, there was a rooftop restaurant with a view over the city, but it was closed in July 1966 and the space was converted into an office for Byrne.

On 26 November 1972, loyalists planted a bomb outside the rear exit door of the Film Centre Cinema, at O'Connell Bridge House, injuring 40 people.

Having been the primary tenant since the completion of the block, the Department of the Environment left the building in 1999.

== Architecture ==
A 12-storey concrete and glass tower faced in Portland stone designed by Desmond FitzGerald. On its north face is a clock and a large advertising space; it has in the past bore the names of Guinness and Sony, and now holds Heineken. At the time it was first opened, the lease on the Guinness sign took in more revenue than all the office space. The construction took 500 tons of structural steel, 90 tons of steel-reinforcing bars, and 7500 tons of concrete. Upon completion, it was 136 feet tall. It contains 45000 square feet of office space, but no car parking. The planning laws requiring one car parking space per 500 square feet of office space were waived for this development. The original plan was to build a matching block on the opposite side of the river, on the site of the Ballast Office, but planning permission for this was rejected.

=== Reception ===
Kevin Duff, writing in The Irish Times declares that, "the design of this 12-storey building is the epitome of its time, when new commercial schemes generally showed no regard for site or context. However, because of its scale and location, O'Connell Bridge House makes probably the single most brutal intrusion into Dublin's urban design - more serious, even, than Liberty Hall."

== Gallery ==
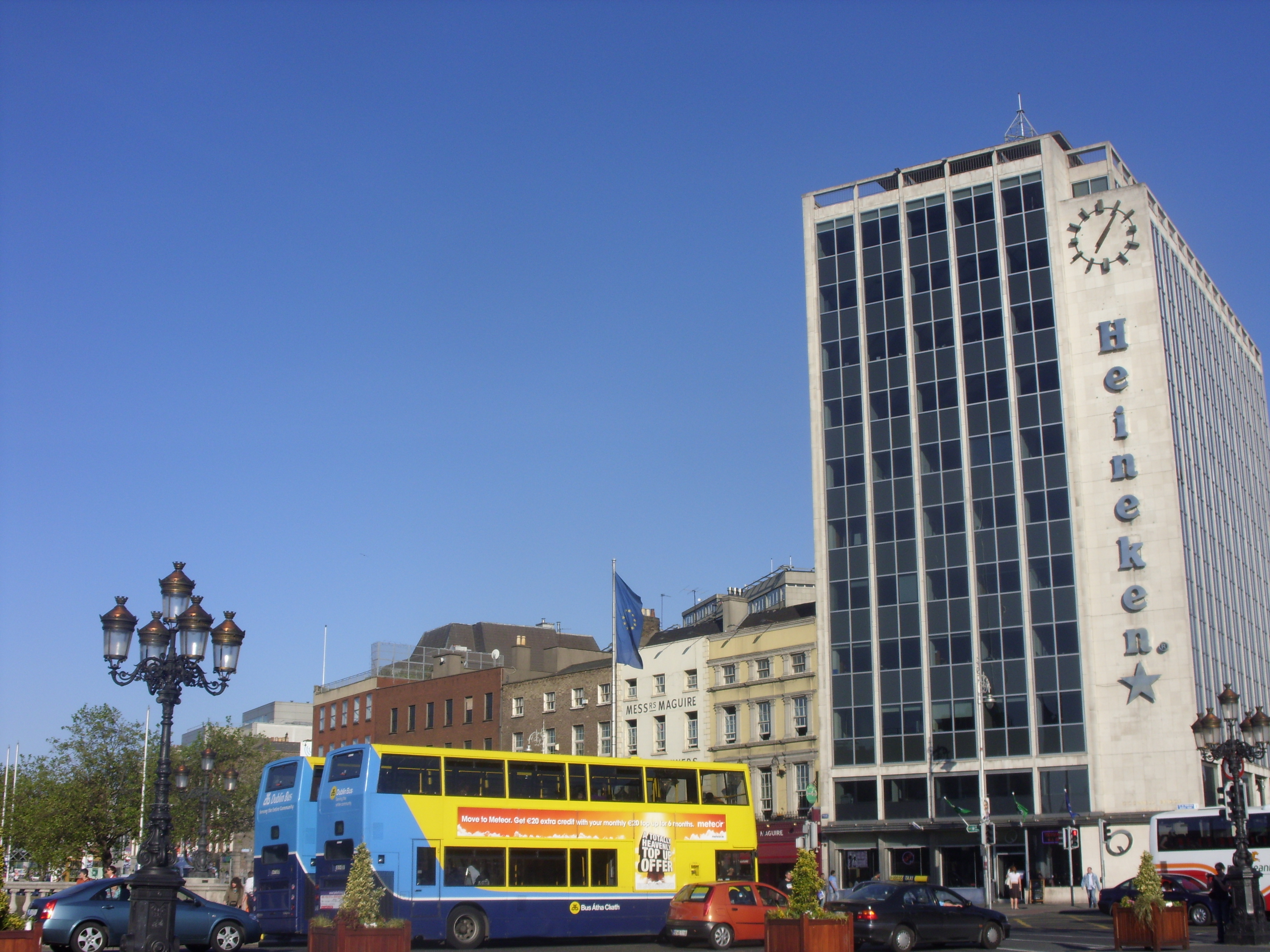

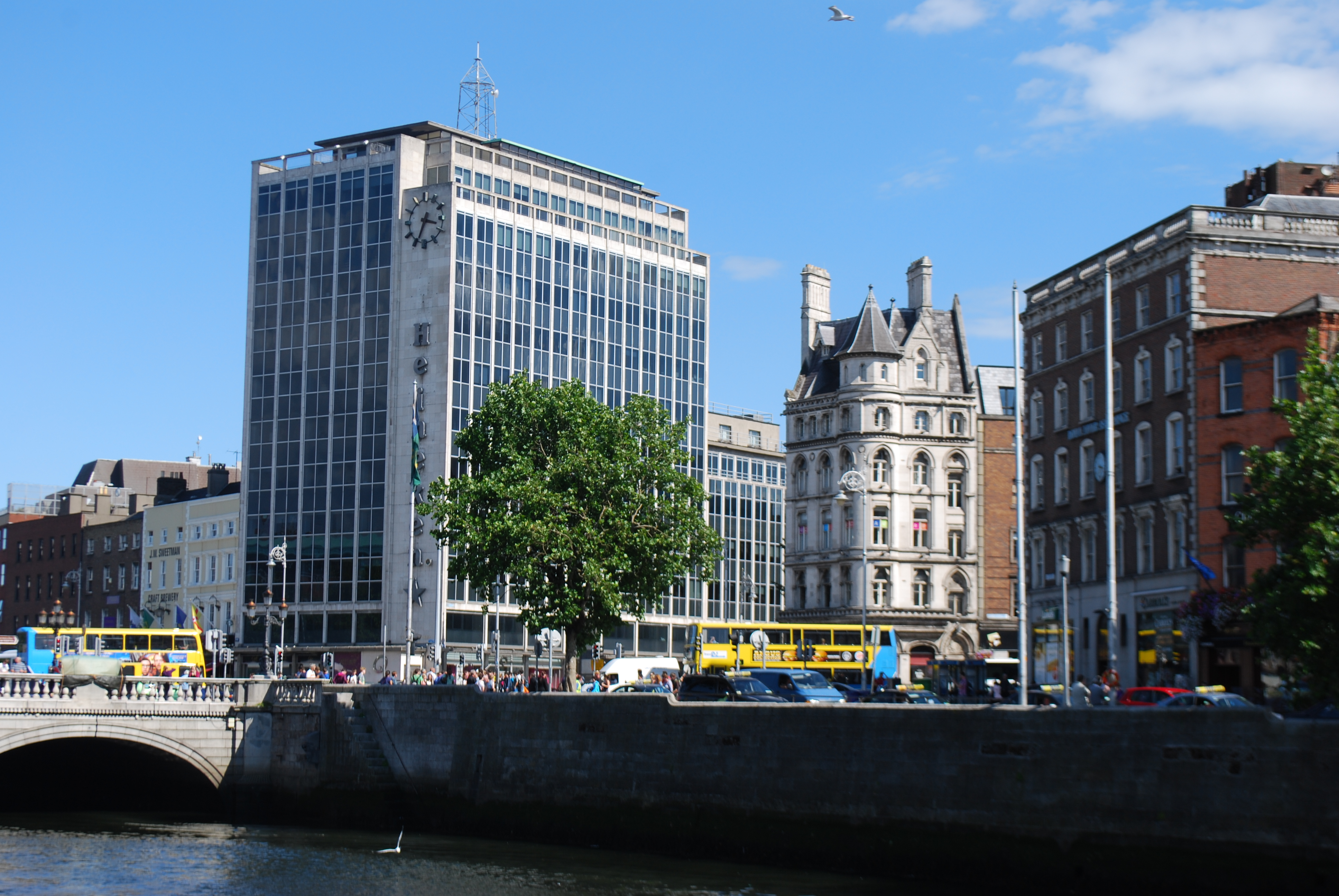

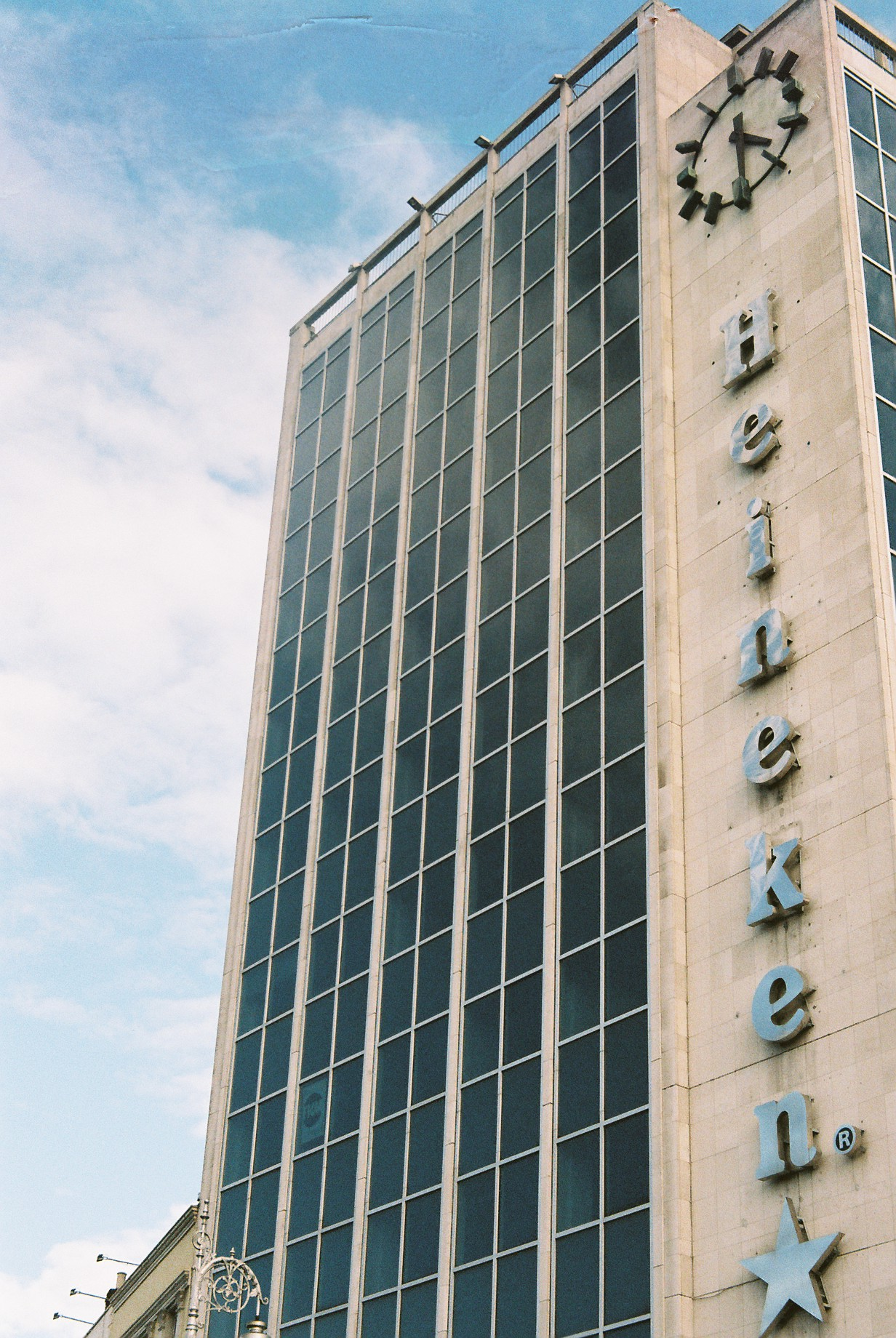

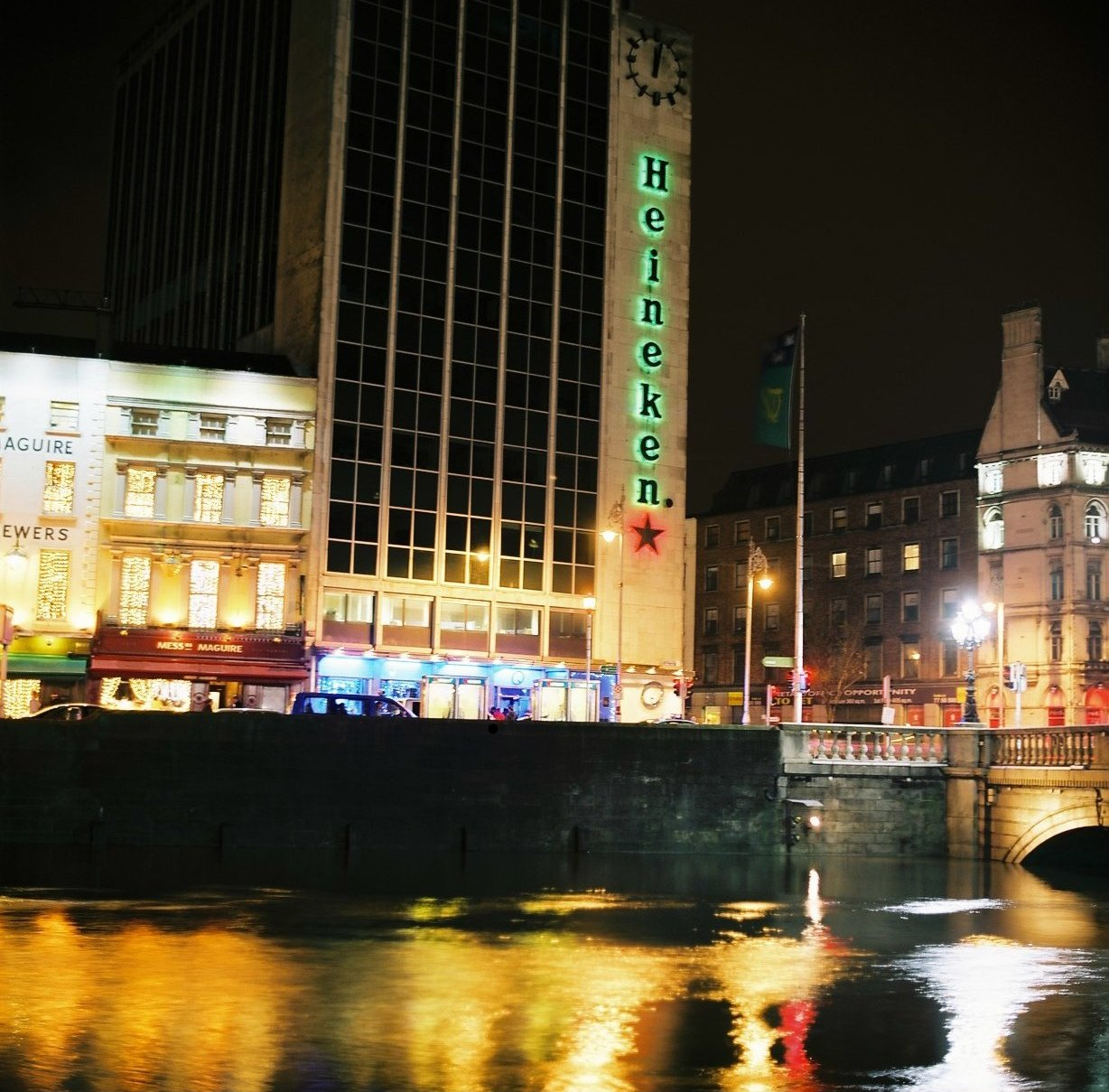

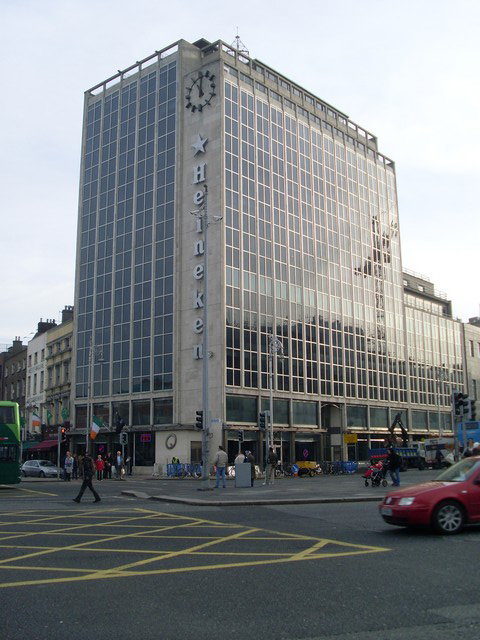

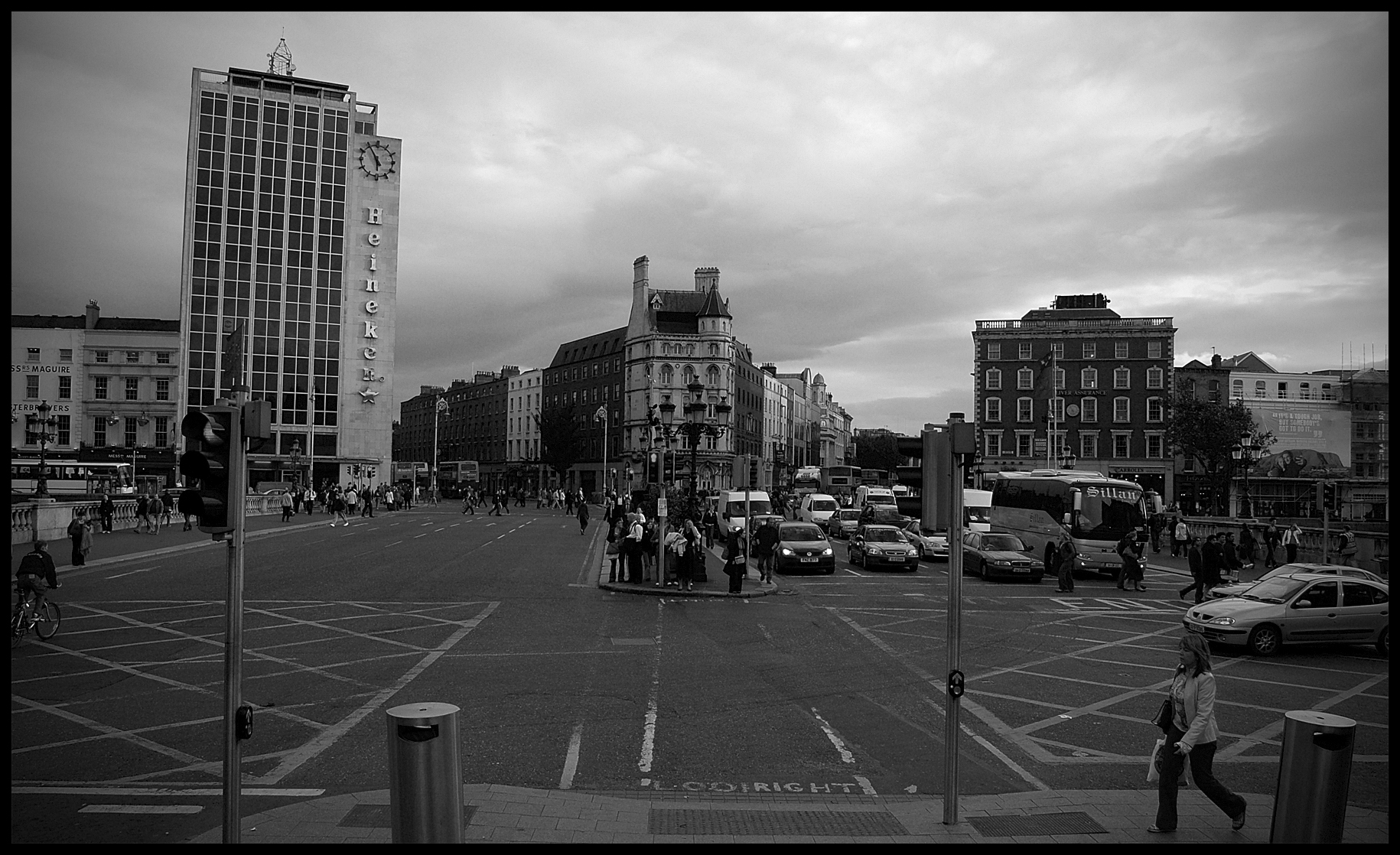

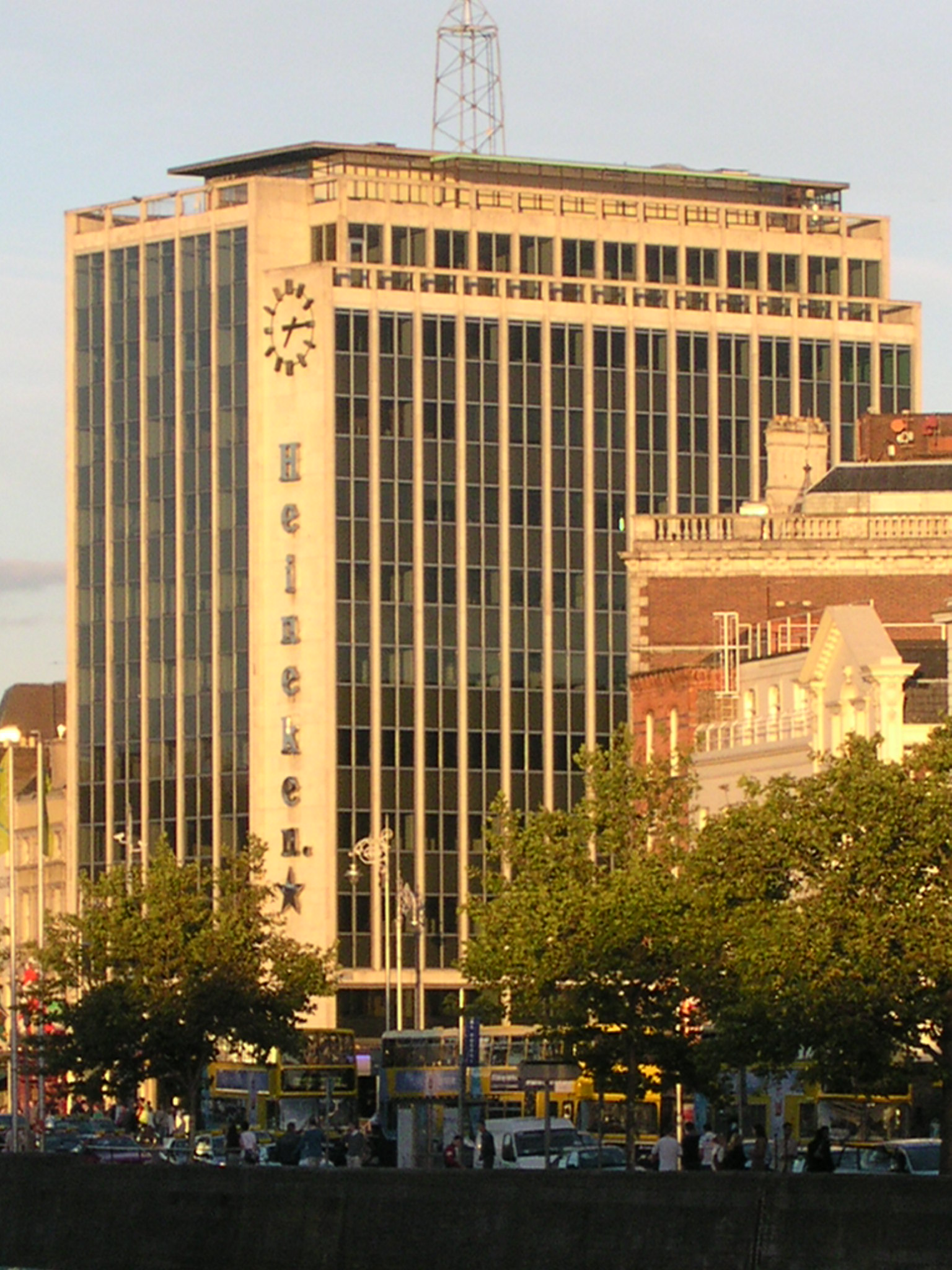
