= Leonid Steele =

Leonid Mikhailovich Steele (Ukrainian: Стиль Леонід Михайлович
- Born: 1921; Lebedyn, Ukrainian SSR, Soviet Union
- Died: October 2014 (aged 92–93); Los Angeles, California, US
- Style: Socialist realism (socrealizm)

Leonid Mikhailovich Steele (Ukrainian: Стиль Леонід Михайлович; 1921 - October 2014) was one of the leading artists of the Russian Realist School - the Soviet period in Russian Art known as socialist realism or socrealizm. A member of the USSR Union of Artists since 1958, he is known for his large multi-figure works, as well as figure, genre and landscape works - especially his portrayals of peasant life in the Ukraine and nature scenes of the Moscow region. In addition to his reputation for having a painterly impressionist style, Steele became one of the early pioneers of what eventually became known as severe style.

== Biography ==
Leonid Steele was born in Lebedyn, a town in the Sumy Region of the Ukrainian SSR. As a child he lived through the famine of 1933 in the Ukraine. He started painting when he was four and in 1939 took part in the World Art Exhibition in New York.

He served in the Red Army during World War II (the Great Patriotic War of the Soviet Union) and suffered a severe concussion from an air bomb during the siege of Kharkiv in 1941. After recovery, he continued serving in Siberia. During recovery and service in Siberia he began studying plein air painting with Evgeny Kudriavtsev – then director of the important State Tretyakov Gallery and student of legendary turn-of-the-century landscape painter Isaak Levitan.

In 1947 Steele entered the Leningrad Repin Institute of Arts of the Soviet Union Art Academy (Russian Imperial Academy of Arts) where he studied first with Professor Platunov and later in the class of Professor Rudolph Frentz. In 1953, a fresh graduate of the painting department, Leonid received his first professional recognition with his diploma painting exhibited in Moscow's State Tretyakov Gallery and in Leningrad's Kazan Cathedral on the occasion of the Fourth Conference of Peace Activists. This painting, entitled Defend the Peace, was reproduced in many editions in the USSR and abroad.

In 1958 he became a Member of the Union of Artists of the USSR with union ID 508.

Some of his best known multi–figure paintings are Komsomoltsy, The Land, The Family (Cossacks Kind Will Never Die), Mothers of the World, and Remembrance. He has participated in 80 exhibitions, including 11 All–Union Exhibitions, the most prestigious of all being in the USSR, including Central Exhibition Hall, Manezh, Moscow Manege. In addition, his paintings and his story were featured in numerous top Soviet mass media publications - such as Ogoniok, Rabotnitsa, Pravda, Izvestia, Sovetskaya Kultura, Smena, and Ukraina - as well as a variety of regional and local newspapers, radio programs and TV shows.

In 1968, Steele travelled around the world with his works, visiting 22 countries.

The artist became a friend of many Soviet celebrities over the years, including Leonid Utyosov, Dmitri Shostakovich, David Oistrakh, Yuri Gagarin, Pavel Popovich and Alexander Vertinsky. He was also an early supporter of a prominent and widely influential protest songwriter of the 1960s, Bulat Okudzhava, whose public appearances were restricted by Soviet authorities at the time. Steele did two live portraits of Bulat, hosted his early underground concerts and made home recordings.

The Family

Leonid's style evolved through the years. Never settling for any one achievement, he pressed on in a continual pursuit of new directions. Almost every decade was marked by a distinctive stylistic shift reflecting a new stage of his artistic development. Once he established his reputation with a painterly impressionist style, Steele shifted direction and became one of the early pioneers of what later became known as severe style. His most distinctive periods were The Academic Period of 1947–1953, The Early Kiev Period of 1953–1965, The Kiev Period of 1965–1975 and Moscow Period of 1975–1990. Dr. Vern Swanson referenced Leonid Steele in his book on Soviet Impressionism.

Steele's recounting of his life and experiences as a Soviet artist was widely quoted and referred to in two important books on the period by Dr. Vern Swanson - Soviet Impressionism and Soviet Impressionist Painting. Steele is featured alongside such important painters of the period as Aleksandr Gerasimov, Aleksandr Deyneka, Isaak Brodsky, Aleksei Gritsai, Akhmed Kitaev, Gely Korzhev, Yuri Kugach, Aleksandr Laktionov, Oleg Lomakin, Konstantin Maksimov, Petr Maltsev, Dmitri Nalbandyan, Georgy Nissky, Yuri Neprintsev, Vasili Nechitailo, Yuri Pimenov, Arkadi Plastov, Yuri Podlyaski, Vladimir Serov, Boris Shcherbakov, Dementi Shmarinov, Valentin Sidorov, Pavel Sokolov-Skalya, Vladimir Stozharov, Nikolai Timkov, the Tkachev brothers, Andrei Tutunov, Boris Ugarov, Edvard Vyrzhikovski, Tatiyana Yablonskaya and Dmitri Zhulinski.

== Later life ==
Leonid Mikhailovich Steele continued to paint in the United States - in California - exhibiting the same passion and energy he has shown since his youth. He was a Lifetime Signature Member of the California Art Club and remains a living legacy of the Art of the Soviet Union.

Leonid Steele was the father of Alexey Steele, a Russian Realist School painter residing in Los Angeles, California.

Leonid died on October 4, 2014, in Los Angeles, California.

== Media publications ==
- All Union Exhibition of 1954, Soviet Artist Publishing 1955. L. Zinger article, reproduction of the painting We Will Defend the Peace.
- We Will Defend the Peace poster, Soviet Artist Publishing 1955
- After the Civil War(Komsomoltsy) poster, Soviet Artist Publishing 1957
- Ogoniok magazine, Pravda Publishing #50 1958 - Reproduction of After the Civil War (Komsomoltsy)
- Unost magazine #11 1958 - Reproduction of Dawn
- Rabotnitsa magazine, Pravda Publishing #8 1958 - Reproduction of Dawn
- Ukraina magazine (main illustrated magazine of the Ukraine SSR) #32 1959 - Reproduction of Pavka Korchagin
- Kiev Evening newspaper #139 1960 - Article and the reproduction of Van Cliburn Portrait
- Sovietskaia Kultura (Soviet Culture) newspaper of KPSS Central Committee and USSR Ministry of Culture, Summer 1963 - Front page reproduction of The Lines About Peace
- Ukraina magazine #21 1964 - Cover reproduction of Lily
- Smena magazine #6 1964 - Reproductions of Lily, Girlfriends, Grandpa Vakula
- Culture and Life newspaper of the Ukraine SSR Ministry of Culture #96 1965 Brigantine is Pressing on Course Review of the one man exhibition by the art critic V. Varakov. Reproductions of Pavka Korchagin, Girlfriends, Lubka
- Pravda of Ukraine newspaper of KPU Central Committee. The article Exhibition of Leonid Steele. Reproduction of I. Patarzhinsky in opera Zaporozhets za Dunaem.
- Sovietskaia Kultura (Soviet Culture) newspaper of KPSS Central Committee and USSR Ministry of Culture #72 1965, The Work Will Be The Answer front editorial column - Report of L. Steele one man exhibition in the deep country side as an example of established city artist bringing art directly to the people.
- Evening Kiev newspaper October 29, 1965 - Article Sunny Canvases by L. Pinsky
- Countryside News newspaper of KPU Central Committee, November 14, 1967, Article Do You Recognize Yourselves, Obuhovans? by art critic A. Pinich - Reproduction of Zemlia (Leonid Steele. "The Land")
- Worker's Newspaper November 21, 1968, Article In the Wake of Columbus by N. Shevtsova - Reproductions from Palma de Majorca and Tunis Street
- Ukraine magazine in English, 1969, Article The Spring of Inspiration by A. Ovsienko - Reproductions from Camomiles and Zemlia (The Land)
- The Dawn of October newspaper February 9, 1969, Article By the Lenin's Decree by A. Ovsienko - Reproduction from Zemlia (The Land)
- Ukraina magazine #39, September 1970 - Reproduction from Zemlia (The Land)
- Ogoniok magazine #23 1970 - Reproduction from Semia(The Family)
- The Ukrainian Canadian Canadian magazine, April 1971 - Cover reproduction of Lily
- Soviet Visual Art book Soviet Artist, 1971 - Chapter Group Portrait by the critic V. Zimenko
- Literary Ukraine newspaper, June 22, 1971, Article Strong Thread by the writer-critic I. Voloshin. The review of the one man exhibition In the Wake of Columbus
- Ukraina magazine #32, August 1971, Article From the People's Spring by A. Ovsienko. In depth critical analysis of artist's career and the influence of his works on the development of Soviet Art. Reproductions from Rest, Roof, Chamomiles, Lubka
- Soviet Artist Publishing, 1971. The poster from Marichka
- Vitchizna/Fatherland/ magazine #9 1971 - Article by the artist about his travels to the 22 countries of the World.
- Soviet Life magazine in English, 1972, Article Artist's View of the Dniper - Reproductions of Dneprodzerzhinsk, Tillage, Kchortitsa Island
- Komsomolskaia Iskra newspaper, Ukraine, November 3, 1973, Review of the one-man exhibition in Odessa In the Wake of Columbus
- People's Tribune newspaper, Ukraine, May 13, 1975, Article The Painting is Created in Ulanovo describing the work on Pamiat (Remembrance)
- Rabotnitsa magazine, Pravda Publishing #3 1976, Editorial article about Mothers of the World which is called the painting-parable. Reproductions of Mothers of the World. Circulation 13,000,000.
- Lenin's Flag newspaper, Moscow Region, November 17, 1978, Article What an Artist Can Do by O. Nikolaev describing the founding of the fine art museum by the artist.
- Lenin's Flag newspaper, Moscow Region, August 5, 1982, Palate of Life – a critical review by L. Diakonitsyn
- Pravda newspaper of KPSS Central Committee, #248 September 5, 1987, Article And to Teach the Others by V. Mastukov

== TV appearances and radio broadcasts ==
- Ukrainian Radio, Kiev, 1960, Exhibition of Leonid Steele by I. Sulimenko and Z. Strelova
- Unost/Youth/ Radio station, 1965, Literary-Musical program Artist Leonid Steele by M. Goraeva
- Unost/Youth/ Radio station, 1970, Sunset and Two Truths by Leonid Steele
- Ukraine Central TV, Kiev, 1970, Special program on Zemlia (The Land) with U. Mazhuga
