= John Byrne (businessman) =

- Born: 1919 near Lixnaw, County Kerry, Ireland
- Died: October 2013 (aged 94)
- Occupation: Property developer

John Byrne (1919 - October 2013) was an Irish property developer and businessperson known for building large offices in central Dublin with his company the Carlisle Trust.

== Life and career ==
John Byrne was born on a small family farm near Lixnaw, County Kerry in 1919. He was the 3rd eldest of 14 children, and made money during the Emergency cutting turf and selling it door-to-door. He moved to Britain in 1941 where he earned money building and operating dance halls. Taoiseach Seán Lemass requested that Byrne return to Ireland to build offices for the growing Irish public sector in the early 1960s. He began by building more dance halls across Ireland. Many of his developments were controversial for replacing Georgian and other older buildings in central Dublin with large office buildings such as O'Connell Bridge House and D'Olier House. In the 2000s, Byrne was still leasing offices to the Irish government, and earning more than €5.7 million.

Along with fellow property developers P. V. Doyle and Matt Gallagher, Byrne employed Desmond Fitzgerald as an architect, Des Traynor as his accountant, and Christopher Gore-Grimes as his solicitor. Byrne was a close friend of Matt Gallagher, and following Gallagher's sudden death in 1974 Byrne mentored Gallagher's son, Patrick, when he took over his father's business.

Byrne amassed a site of over 500 acres of green-belt land in Baldoyle during the 1960s and 1970s, including a former Baldoyle racecourse. It was through the development of this land, which had previously been precluded from development, that led to links being drawn between Byrne and Charles Haughey. In May 1970, Haughey attended a meeting between senior officials of Dublin Corporation and Byrne during which the development of this land was discussed including the racecourse. In 1999 Byrne sold the racecourse to Sean Mulryan.

In 1971, Byrne established two trusts with the Guinness Mahon Cayman Trust. During the Moriarty Tribunal, Byrne claimed that he never gave Haughey "a penny in his life, or a pound" when confronted with evidence of more than £300,000 of Byrne's money being transferred to bank accounts controlled by Traynor and used by Haughey. He was also an investor in Celtic Helicopters, a company owned by Haughey's son, Ciarán. Byrne was also implicated in the Ansbacher report, having held trusts in the Cayman Islands in the scheme by Traynor. In 2011, Byrne was successful in having parts of the Ansbacher report which tied him to illegal offshore accounts overturned. He remained a customer of Ansbacher Cayman, being one of the substantial Irish resident customers of the bank.

In 2002, Byrne handed over control of his business to his wife, Ciara. Byrne died at aged 94 in 2013. His son, John Jr, succeeded him in his business the Carlisle Trust. The Carlisle Trust owns a number of Irish companies, such as Smithfield Property Development Ltd, Alstead Securities and Dublin City Estates Ltd.
