= Matt Gallagher (businessman) =

Irish property developer and businessman

- Born: 15 February 1915; Cashel, County Sligo, Ireland
- Died: 7 January 1974 (aged 58); Mulhuddart, County Dublin, Ireland
- Occupation: Property developer
- Spouse: Patricia Sheeran (m. 1946)
- Children: 7, including Patrick

Matt Gallagher (15 February 1915 – 7 January 1974) was an Irish property developer and businessman who founded the Gallagher Group.

== Early life and family ==
Matt Gallagher was born in Cashel, Curry parish, County Sligo on 15 February 1915. His parents were Matthew, a farmer, and his wife Margaret Gallagher (née Reilly). He had 13 siblings. Gallagher was educated at Moylough national school, while also working on the family farm. He played Gaelic football, and was on part of the Curry team that won the 1930 Sligo minor championship, leading to him being selected for the Sligo minors. He left for England in summer 1932, following a road works contract which yielded him just £17 profit.

== Life in England ==
Gallagher began work in England as a farm labourer in Yorkshire and Lincolnshire, later working on building sites, which led to him moving around the country. He mostly sent his salary back to his family in Cashel, and visited every couple of years. His younger brother eventually came with him to England. In early 1939 Gallagher pooled his savings with his brothers Joe, Dan, Hubert, and James, to put a down payment on two trucks. They used these to transport materials that were used to build factories, runways and raid shelters for the British World War II preparations. At first they worked out of Liverpool, but when the air raids on British cities began in 1940, they moved to a shale pit in Lancashire which they leased. They also commenced hauling landfill to bombsites. On one occasion, Gallagher continued to work on a site during and air raid, only leaving when the planes were overhead. This inspired his brother James to say that he was "the king of our family and the king of Ireland as far as I'm concerned". The brothers grew their fleet to 10 trucks, which resulted in them securing an 18-month government contract to transport farm labourers.

By 1944 the Gallaghers had 100 trucks with 90 on hire, and they moved to London where they began delivering materials for reconstruction. In 1945 they were among the first to engage in the pending housing boom, building a housing development at St Albans, one of the first post-war private developments. The new Labour government banned private home building, but the Gallaghers continued to work demolishing air raid shelters and working on public housing contracts. Gallagher met and married Patricia Sheeran in 1946, and the couple lived in Tottenham with his brother James and his wife. They lived above their restaurant.

== Return to Ireland ==
Britain was hit with an economic crisis in 1947 which had a severe impact on the construction industry. The Gallaghers returned to Ireland by 1949, having tested the Irish housing market. Dan had died, leaving Hubert, Joe, and Charles to stay in London to continue the business there. James led the Dublin business, and Gallagher commuted between London and Dublin before he settled in Santry, Dublin around 1950. In Ireland they formed a partnership and traded as Messrs Gallagher, Roarty and Furlong, and began work on small local-authority housing contracts in Dublin. They then progressed to their first private development in Santry, noted for their competitive prices, higher building standards and advanced building techniques. They primarily worked in Dublin, and while still taking on some local-authority contracts, the brothers preferred to build on land they owned to maximise their profits.

In response to supply issues, the Gallaghers diversified into other fields including joinery with Gowna Wood Industries, at Tubbercurry founded around 1950, and in 1952 establishing the Dublin plumbing and heating firm, P. J. Matthews Ltd. Between 1955 and 1956 they opened 3 factories in Tubbercurry for manufacturing builders' hardware. In 1957 Gallagher suddenly quit the business, selling his brothers his 51% share for £250,000. Gallagher retired to his farm and mansion, "Hollywood Rath", Mulhuddart, County Dublin where he bred cattle. However he was restless, and his wife ordered him to return to work. He took over Paramount Builders Limited in 1958, and this company would eventually become the Gallagher Group. He returned to home building in the Dublin suburbs from 1958 to 1962.

== Gallagher Group ==
The Gallaghers were familiar with many politicians through their work, in particular Seán Lemass. His influence led to James running for political office. In 1965, Gallagher ran unsuccessfully in the senate elections as a Fianna Fáil candidate, and instead became a significant party donor. He also became a close friend of Lemass's son-in-law, Charles Haughey. Haughey and Gallagher became friends in the late 1950s, with Gallagher becoming one of the businessmen who financed Haughey. With Haughey, Gallagher formed a drinking circle with Donogh O'Malley and John Healy.

Haughey's accountancy firm, Haughey Boland, handed accounts for all of the Gallagher Group companies, and Jock Haughey was an engineer in the Group. Along with fellow property developers P. V. Doyle and John Byrne, Gallagher employed Desmond Fitzgerald as an architect, Des Traynor as his accountant, and Christopher Gore-Grimes as his solicitor. Gallagher was among the clients that Traynor facilitated in tax evasion by moving his assets to the Cayman Islands. Traynor was also a director of the Gallagher Group, and advised on the 1961 establishment of Merchant Banking Limited, a care hire-purchase business which later developed into a small deposit bank. Customers of Merchant Banking Limited were mostly Irish emigrants in Great Britain and the United States who deposited money in Ireland to avoid tax in their resident countries. In 1971 Gallagher opened Merchant Banking Northern Ireland, to offer a similar service to customers in the Republic of Ireland. Traynor created a company for Gallagher in the Cayman Islands called Bering Estates Co.

Gallagher's access to large funds allowed him to exploit a huge shift in Irish government housing policy in the early 1960s. Fianna Fáil oversaw a new policy which aimed to ease the housing crisis by incentivising private property development and promoting home ownership. In 1964 Gallagher announced he would provide new housing stock to those previously unable to afford their own homes, using the new 1963 planning legislation which facilitated a small number of well connected developers in cornering the housing market. Gallagher bought up undeveloped sites and successfully arranged for rezoning to residential, resulting in him becoming the wealthiest residential property developer in Dublin. Gallagher in turn fed back funds to Fianna Fáil as a donor through Taca, the Fianna Fáil fund-raising organisation he helped found in 1966. Taca gave businessmen direct access to leading party members for a large annual subscription. Gallagher was one of Taca's largest donor, and was involved in its administration.

He built 169 houses for free for a number of business associate and politicians, including Traynor and Neil Blaney. Blaney oversaw the exclusion of land owned by Gallagher from a Dublin Corporation compulsory purchase order in 1964. Gallagher then built 800 homes on the land, and sold them at market value to the Corporation. The head of planning at Dublin Corporation, George Redmond, later admitted to advising Gallagher on his applications, and from the mid 1960s, received annual payments of between £10,000 to £15,000 from Gallagher and his brothers. Redmond's salary at the time was £10,000, and Gallagher also built his home and paid for family holidays.

He continued to supply the Dublin housing market with affordable suburban homes, but also more upmarket residential developments in Castleknock. The Gallagher Group had a high turnover, and expanded hugely in the early 1970s as the Dublin housing boom continued. With this growth, it resulted in dependence on larger banks, and the Group was affected by the credit freeze of 1966. While he was successful at developing sites other developers eschewed, he routinely reneged on promised estate facilities such as park, playgrounds, wide roads and trees. He also exploited Irish urban land laws which allowed him to retain residual property claims, meaning he could levy ground rents on those who purchased his houses. Gallagher was involved in planning and legal disputes regularly, most often prevailing.

Between 1963 and 1964, Gallagher bought up twenty properties on Mountjoy Square, Dublin, which included half of the south side. He immediately began a campaign of neglect, leaving the buildings empty and falling into dereliction, forcing the tenants to leave. There were accusations that those less inclined to leave would have a sack of starving rats released into the attic of their home. With the houses declining, the Corporation ordered their demolition on the grounds of safety, and large areas of the south side of the square were levelled to make way for an office development. Gallagher's actions generated angry opposition from other residents on the square and the Irish Georgian Society. In particular Desmond and Mariga Guinness stymied his development by buying a house in the middle of the square's south side in 1964, number 50. When Gallagher demolished the two adjoining houses, it left the remaining house in danger of collapse and the Guinnesses were successful in securing a high court order instructing him to provide supports for the house on either side. Other campaigners acquired houses in the square. The RTÉ current affairs programme Seven days aired an exposé on Gallagher and his activities on the square in 1967, despite Gallagher offering the show's producers a free house. He agreed to be interviewed for the programme, and later bowed to political pressure to sell his Mountjoy Square properties to the Irish Georgian Society, at a profit.

In 1969, he purchased land and a Victorian house from Haughey, called Grangemore, for £204,000 in north County Dublin, having convinced Haughey to purchase the house and 45-acre site in 1959 for £13,000. The sale of this enabled Haughey to purchase Abbeville house and its 250 acres for £144,997 in 1969. Haughey also purchased a stud farm in County Meath. During the 1969 general election, this transaction became a major issue, and Gallagher was mentioned numerous times in Dáil debates. However, the criticism was successfully deflected. He later supported Haughey financially and with company cars following his expulsion from office in 1970.

== Later life and death ==
Gallagher established a stud farm in Mulhuddart, and by 1970 he had twelve racehorses. His horse, Noble Life, won the 1972 Gloucestershire Hurdle at the Cheltenham festival. In an effort to redeem his reputation, and that of his political allies, Gallagher donated £10,000 to the Meath Hospital for the construction of a new administration building. In 1969 he committed to building a new headquarters and gallery for the Royal Hibernian Academy at Ely Place. He commissioned Raymond McGrath to design the 12,250-square-foot Gallagher Gallery, and by March 1972 the project was hugely over budget. A portrait bust of Gallagher by Oisín Kelly was to be a prominent exhibit in the new gallery, which was unfinished at the time of Gallagher's death in 1974.

As an employer to 750 people directly, and a further 900 contract workers, Gallagher remained an important ally to the Fianna Fáil leadership. He expanded his reach, starting commercial developments such as Donaghmede shopping centre, and building housing estates in Cork, Galway, Limerick, Sligo, and Waterford, finishing 1,000 homes in 1973 alone. In 1972 he bought timber suppliers W. and L. Crowe, and considered floating his company on the stock exchange. In his extensive portfolio, Gallagher owned 4 pubs in Dublin, including the Merrion Inn near Ballsbridge in 1965. He had borrowed heavily to buy up land, and was hit hard by the 1973-1974 oil crisis and property market crash which saw high interest rates and a stark contraction of the mortgage market. Interest rates rose from a projected 7% to 18%, leaving Gallagher unable to support his sizeable loans. The Central Bank pressured Merchant Banking to significantly reduce its involvement with the Gallagher Group in 1973, to which Gallagher responded by taking control of the O'Connell Benefit, a small building society. He sold his pubs and Yellow God, his prize stallion, in summer 1973, a move which probably saved his business.

Gallagher died suddenly at his home on 7 January 1974. He and his wife had four daughters and three sons; Danny, Delia, Maureen, Patrick, Helen, Paul and Kathryn. His second son, Patrick, succeeded him as head of the Gallagher Group.
