= Ely Place, Dublin =

Road in Dublin, Ireland

Ely Place
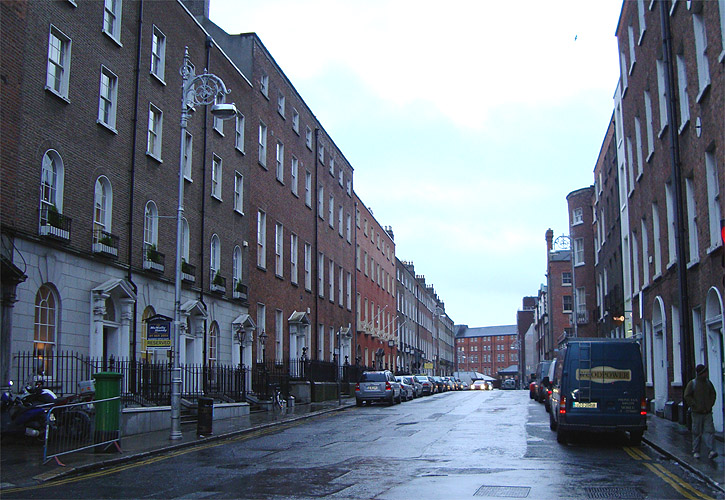

- Location within Central Dublin
- Native name: Plás Íle (Irish)
- Former name: Hume Row
- Namesake: Henry Loftus, 1st Earl of Ely
- Length: 200 m (660 ft)
- Width: 17 metres (56 ft)
- Location: Dublin, Ireland
- Postal code: D02
- Coordinates: 53.337391°N 6.254196°W
- southwest end: dead end
- northeast end: Merrion Street Upper, Merrion Row, Baggot Street Lower

Other
- Known for: Royal Hibernian Academy

Ely Place (/ˈiːlaɪ/ Irish: Plás Íle) is a street in central Dublin with Georgian architecture. It is a continuation of Upper Merrion Street and the place where Lower Baggot Street and Merrion Row meet. Both the latter and Hume Street link it to St Stephen's Green.

== History ==
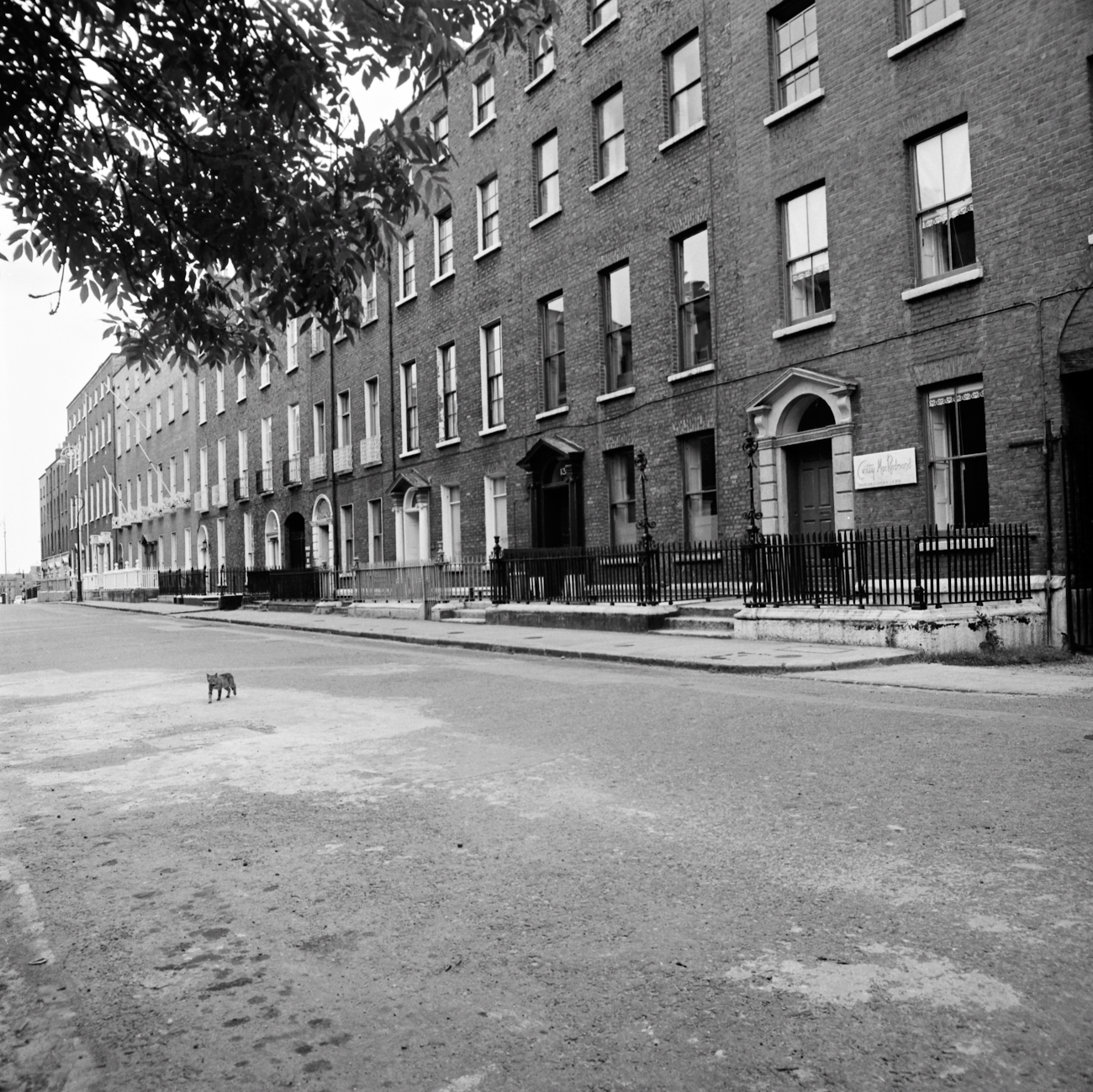
Ely Place in 1966

The street was laid out in 1768. In 1773, it was marked as Hume Row. The first few houses on the street (2-4, the North end) are neo-Georgian and were built in the 1970s.

The first house to be built on the street was Ely House (now No. 7/8), constructed in 1771 by Henry Loftus, 1st Earl of Ely on land leased to Lord Ely in 1770. Nos. 7, 9 and 10 now stand where its garden and carriage entrance used to be. On the death of Lord Ely in 1783, Lady Ely lived here until she sold the property in 1809. At one time it belonged to Sir William Thornley Stoker, brother of Bram Stoker, whom Oliver St. John Gogarty used to visit when he lived on the street. The Knights of Saint Columbanus bought this house in 1922 and made it their headquarters.

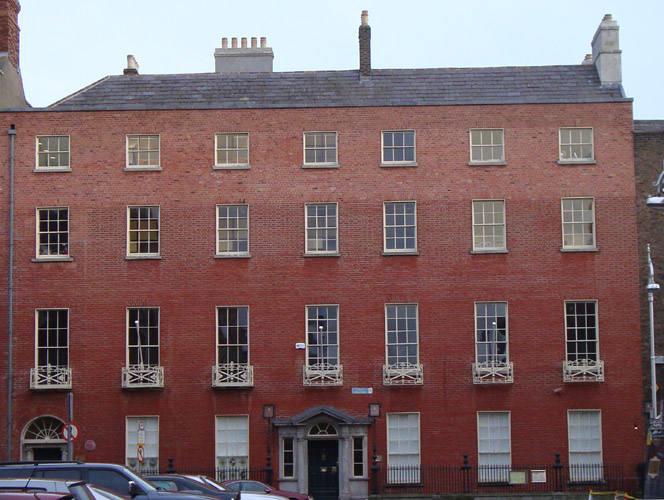
Ely House, entrance to No. 7 on left, entrance to No. 8 in centre

Next door, at No.6, lived the Countess of Clare (Anne Whaley, wife of Lord Chancellor of Ireland John Fitzgibbon (1749–1802), died at Ely Place), who also employed Stapleton. Both ladies were known for their grand houses and their lavish entertainments therein. Both houses are richly decorated with elaborate plasterwork. The two houses at Nos.5 and 6 were taken into Government service in 1859, when they became the Offices of the General Valuation and Boundary Survey of Ireland under Sir Richard Griffith, Bart. It was here that Sir Richard completed his magisterial work on the land and tenement valuation of Ireland, which over time became known as the "Griffith Valuation". These buildings retained their grandeur through the next century until in 1998, the Valuation Office moved away from Ely Place after a tenancy of 138 years. The building is now occupied by the advertising agency Ogilvy & Mather.

Another resident of this street was John Philpot Curran (1750–1817), the lawyer and wit who defended the United Irishmen and whose daughter became enamoured of Robert Emmet. He moved to No. 12 (now No. 4) in 1780 and lived there until 1807.

The original house at No. 3 was the location of the Queen's Service Academy, a school founded in 1852, which prepared students for competitive public examinations for entry into the British Army, Civil Service, Royal Irish Constabulary and the legal profession. A later headmaster was Dr William John Chetwode Crawley (1843-1916), an author, academic and historian of Freemasonry.

== Ely Place Upper ==
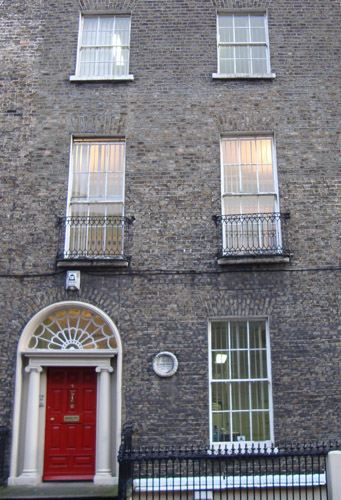
George Moore's house

Ely Place Upper is a continuation on the south end of Ely Place. It consists of a terrace of five houses built in 1828. In 1837 it was marked on maps as Smith's buildings after the builder, Thomas Smith who lived in number 1 from 1836 to 1849.

No. 3 Ely Place Upper was the residence in the 1890s of Frederick and Annie Dick, and it became the meeting place of the Theosophical Society. W. B. Yeats, Maud Gonne and George Russell were visitors.

The writer George Moore lived in No. 4 at the start of the 20th century. He got into a row with his neighbours over the colour of his hall door.

On the other side of the street lived the writer, surgeon and wit Oliver St. John Gogarty (1878–1957). The Royal Hibernian Academy later took over the house.

== Developments ==
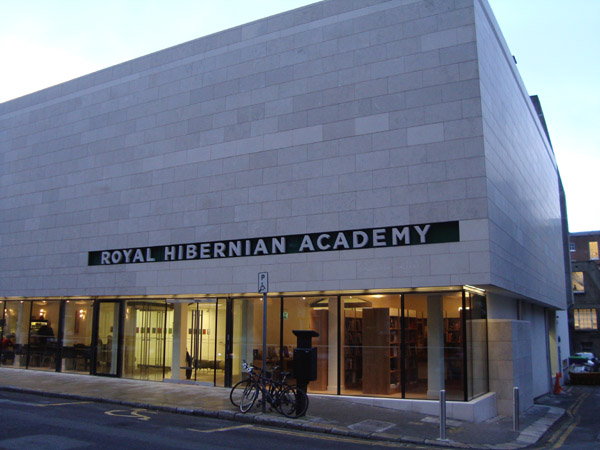
RHA building

Around 1970 the property developer Matt Gallagher intended to build a grand new gallery, to be called the "Gallagher Gallery", for the Royal Hibernian Academy. His offer was accepted with gratitude by the RHA, and work started in 1972. The academy's old headquarters, a Victorian house which had once been the property of Oliver St. John Gogarty was demolished and it was expected that the modern building, designed by Raymond McGrath, formerly Principal Architect with the OPW, would be ready for its first exhibition in 1975. Matt Gallagher died unexpectedly in January 1974. His son, Patrick Gallagher, inherited the business, and within a few months, all work on the site stopped. For many years the building site was used as a storage yard for various Gallagher projects around the city centre. Around 2002 the old building was renovated and assumed its present shape.

Many of the buildings on the street are used for offices and the Irish National Parks and Wildlife Service department has its office on this street.

== See also ==
- List of streets and squares in Dublin
