= James Hanley (painter) =

Irish artist

- Born: 1965 (age 60–61)
- Education: University College Dublin; National College of Art and Design
- Known for: painting

James Hanley (born 1965) is an Irish painter and designer.

== Life and work ==
Hanley graduated from University College Dublin in 1987 with a degree in History of Art and English, and from the National College of Art and Design in 1991 with a bachelor's degree in Fine Art Painting. He works in a naturalistic style and has exhibited widely in his native Ireland.

In 1996, Hanley visited Bosnia and Croatia with the Irish Defence Forces, conducting research ahead of producing a painting to commemorate Ireland's leadership of the European Union Monitoring Mission in the former Yugoslavia; the resulting picture hangs in the military college at the Curragh Camp. In 2006 he designed a coin to mark the 175th anniversary of the Irish Office of Public Works and in 2007, he was the artist in residence at the Centre cultural irlandais de Paris. He was commissioned by the Irish post office to design three Christmas stamps for 2008. He also painted the official portrait of Taoiseach Bertie Ahern, the second term portrait of President of Ireland Mary McAleese, and a picture for the centenary of the Abbey Theatre.

He has lectured and taught painting and drawing classes regularly at the National Gallery of Ireland since 1990, and lectured part time at the National College of Art and Design from 1995 to 1998.

=== Holdings ===
Hanley's work is held by the National Gallery of Ireland, the Irish Museum of Modern Art, and in the collections of the Office of Public Works and the Arts Council, from which it can be loaned to Irish State offices and agencies. Works are also held by his alma mater, UCD, by the University of Limerick, AIB Bank and the Irish National Lottery.

== Other roles and recognition ==
Hanley has say on the Board of Governors of the National Gallery of Ireland and is a member of Aosdána, and also a member and past Secretary of the Royal Hibernian Academy.

== Personal life ==
Hanley is married to Órla Dukes, and lives in Dublin. He attended secondary school at Terenure College, Dublin.

== External sources ==
- "James Hanley Curriculum Vitae"; Jameshanley.net. Retrieved 11 February 2011.
- Hanley, James (2009); Comhghall Casy – Studies in Still Life"; Irish Arts Review. Retrieved 13 February 2011
