= Conor Walton =

Irish figurative painter (born 1970)

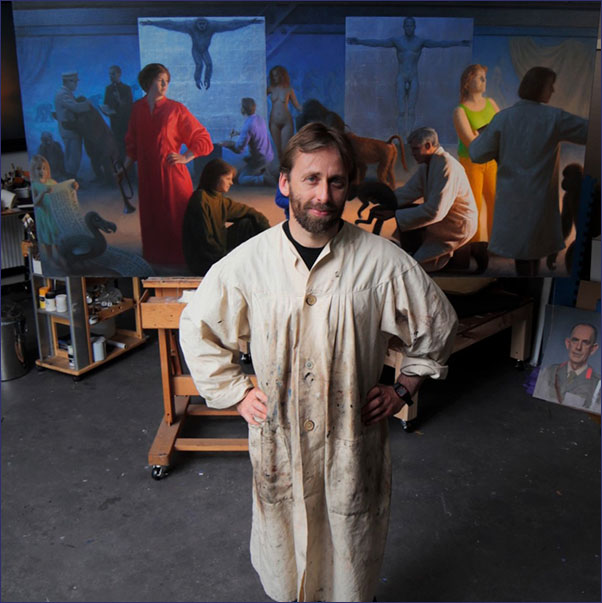
Conor Walton in his studio

Conor Walton (born 1970) is an Irish figurative painter. Walton lives and works in Arklow, Ireland.

== Biography ==
Walton was born in Ireland and trained at the National College of Art and Design in Dublin and Charles Cecil Studios in Florence, Italy. Walton has been featured in multiple Irish and international solo exhibitions.

His commissioned portraits can be found in many public and private collections, including The National Self Portrait Collection of Ireland, The Irish Armed Forces and those of Trinity College and University College, both in Dublin.

His work has also featured on book covers and postage stamps in Ireland and abroad.

== Work ==
Walton paints principally from life and imagination, eschewing photorealism for more painterly values. While retaining an uncanny realism from a distance, on close examination his mark-making is often gestural and the surface densely worked.

== Critical Appreciation ==
According to critic Donald Kuspit,

"In Walton’s work what Baudelaire called the 'Great Tradition' is reborn with a fresh sense of social and personal, and with that humanizing and contemporary, purpose ... His art is ... a major example of what I have called the new objectivism."

In the view of Michael Pearce,

"Peremptory satire ages fast on the hurried stage of global politics, but because Walton’s burlesques are clad in the finery of brilliant execution, they are destined for long lives as fine examples of the cutting sharpness of the best of 21st century representational art."

Niall MacMonagle writes that

"Walton, who studied in Florence and enjoys an international reputation, is steeped in the classical tradition, has perfected the grand style but he is also a thoroughly modern artist; the work is informed by a contemporary intellectual sensibility."

== Awards ==
- Keating McLoughlin and Don Niccolo D'Ardia Caracciolo medal from the Royal Hibernian Academy
- 1993 RDS Taylor Art Award
- 2005 BP Portrait award shortlisted
- 2013 Art Renewal Center Still Life winner
- 2014 Art Renewal Center Still Life winner
- 1st Prize, ModPortrait 2017
- De Agró International Award, Troina Museum of Contemporary Art, Italy 2022
