= Alexey Steele =

Soviet-American painter (born 1967)

Alexey Steele (born 1967 in Kyiv, Soviet Ukraine) is an American painter of the Russian Representational School and a Soviet Art scholar. He moved to Los Angeles in 1990. Steele gained recognition for his unusual multi-figure compositions of an exceptionally large scale. His areas of expertise also include portraits, nudes and plein-air landscapes. Based on his interviews, Steele expresses strong interest in the direction of art in the 21st century.

== Background ==
Alexey Steele began his art training at an early age in the studio of his father, Socialist Realism painter Leonid Mikhailovich Steele. The young artist furthered his professional education at the Surikov Art Institute of the Soviet Academy of Arts in Moscow, studying under the well-known yet controversial painter Ilya Glazunov. Steele had his first one-man exhibition in the United States at the Carnegie Museum of Art in California in 2004.

== Work ==
Even though his Russian heritage is often noted in his palette as well as the treatment of his subjects, Steele's approach to figure is rooted in the Renaissance and Baroque periods. At the same time, his works possess a modern feel and intensity in their disregard of the mainstream and in their peculiar audacity of grand scale and grand themes. Steele's fusion of realistically rendered forms with allegorical elements almost impose his personal world on the viewer, resulting in strongly metaphorical imagery as in his 20-foot “Soul of the Hero,” executed for a private residence in LA, and his depiction of Mick Fleetwood in “Blue Rose.”

Through its broad thematic range, Steele's work exhibits a fascination with the expressive possibilities of figure based on a skillful representation of dynamic foreshortenings, and the ability to construct complex compositions. At the same time, his depiction of epic grandeur comes across even in his plein-air landscape works, as in “Glowing Cliff,” and in his portrayal of larger than life contemporary personalities, such as the portrait of “Donna Fleischer.”

Solving various problems in the development of his mammoth works, Steele employs largely forgotten Renaissance period processes. He is known for creating full size drawings, referred to as “cartoons,” which attract attention in their own right, as opposed to other artists who may use such drawings as only preliminary sketches. Steele's venture into the public art arena was marked by the “Angel of Unity,” executed for a city-related public art project noted in the Los Angeles Times on June 5, 2003. It explores the archetypical commonalities of Judaism, Christianity and Islam. In December 2008 the Carnegie Art Museum commissioned and acquired to its permanent collection Steele's major master drawing "Quiet Steps of Approaching Thunder" (72 x 48) which links figurative art to our era of crisis. Continuing work on his large scale drawings, in August 2011 he exhibited an epic cartoon measuring 100" X 80" titled "Rising: Jaboy, Christian, Derron, Michael, Luis" in "The New Romantic Figure ", a ground breaking group show of figurative works by prominent Californian artists at California Lutheran University's Kwan Fong Gallery.

For his heroic approach to art and his crusading personality, Steele is sometimes described as “A Modern Warrior of Art.” He is an unabashed proponent of 21st Century figurative art, saying “American realism is the true non-conformism of our time, and that’s exciting; that’s the most exciting thing that’s happened to the art world since Picasso” in an interview for CLU.

In June 2009, Steele received Artemis Award for celebrating the power and beauty of women through his art on a heroic scale in the modern world particularly in his multi-figure compositions “The Circle” and “The Soul of The Hero”. He was one of the 14 distinguished honorees and came to Athens for the Annual Euro-American Women's Council's Global Forum sponsored by the Greek Ministry of Foreign Affairs, Ministry of Culture, and the Mayor of Athens.

In November 2009, Alexey Steele received Gusi Peace Prize in the Philippines for his work on turning art into a tool of International Conflict Resolution and for his "Fire of Peace" composition. In the works since 2001, "Fire of Peace" serves as the modern day icon for new inter-cultural paradigm of inclusive unity and mutual respect, reflecting broader pluralistic culture while remaining viable to traditional communities, thus encouraging a seismic shift in their fundamental perception of each other, presenting an inspiring vision of lasting acceptance and embrace among most vital to World Peace Jewish, Christian and Muslim communities.

In March 2010, Steele founded NOVOREALISM, a venture consisting of an online magazine, gallery and academy, and aimed at explaining his views in contemporary art.

== Trivia ==
Steele's noted painting “Desire of Light” appeared on the cover of actress/model/singer/fashion designer Milla Jovovich’s 1993 album “Divine Comedy.” This led the record company to employ the strategic placement of a sticker on the figure's breasts for which 17-year-old Jovovich posed.

Director David Lynch used Steele's painting “Battle of the Angels” in his commercial.

“Battle of the Angels” also appeared in a Toyota commercial representing the office of a sinister financial ruler of the world. It is rumored that the theme for this work was suggested to the artist by actor Sylvester Stallone.

Steele inspired disturbing concepts on singer-activist Catman Cohen's album covers for “How I want to die” and “How I want to Live."

Steele's trademark appearance was the subject of a Bill Maher joke involving “Alexey’s Mustache Enhancer” on the HBO program, “Real Time with Bill Maher” (September 14, 2007, Episode 108).
