= Des Traynor =

Irish banker, financier and accountant

- Born: 3 June 1931; Dublin, Ireland
- Died: 11 May 1994 (aged 62); Clontarf, Dublin

Des Traynor (3 June 1931 - 11 May 1994) was an Irish banker, financier and accountant known for his dealings with Charles Haughey and his involvement in the "Ansbacher Affair". He became known as "Charlie's Bag Man".

== Early life and family ==
Des Traynor was born James Desmond Traynor on 3 June 1931 in Dublin. His parents were John Joseph and Kathleen Traynor (née O'Connor) who lived at 39 Grand Canal Street, Dublin. His father was a motor driver. Traynor attended the Christian Brothers School on Westland Row, and later St Mary's College, Rathmines. In 1951, he joined the Haughey Boland firm of accountants as its first articled clerk, articled to Charles Haughey. His long relationship with Haughey earned him the nickname of "Charlie's Bag Man".

Traynor married Doreen, and lived at Kilronan, Howth Road, Clontarf, Dublin. They had 1 daughter and 6 sons.

== Career ==
Traynor became a partner in the accountancy firm by 1961, with a growing network of business contacts through Haughey, who brought many high profile clients to the firm. Traynor joined the board of directors of Matt Gallagher's building firm, the Gallagher Group, in 1961, later joining the board of property developer John Byrne's Carlisle Trust Ltd and Dublin City Estates. Both Gallagher and Byrne were friends of Haughey. As Haughey's political career progressed, Traynor took charge of his finances. Through Haughey, Traynor became the most prominent financial adviser in Ireland, particularly to those engaged in the Dublin property boom of the 1960s. This work led him to deal extensively with Guinness & Mahon, one of the oldest merchant banks in Dublin. Guinness & Mahon were associated with the Anglo-Irish ascendancy, and it was viewed that someone new should be brought in to dispel that image. In 1969, Traynor was appointed as co-managing director of the bank, serving until 1986. He oversaw the incorporation of the Guinness Mahon Cayman Trust, a bank in the Cayman Islands, in 1970. He was appointed chairman, with John Collins and John Furze as managers. Traynor was appointed to the new board of the newly merged Roadstone Ltd and Irish Cement Ltd in 1970, to aid in the tensions around the merger caused by directors from the two previous companies.

In Ireland in 1974 the government introduced capital gains tax, and the highest income-tax bracket was 80%. Guinness Mahon Cayman Trust was given a banking licence, and Traynor devised a discretionary trust operation which enabled clients to avoid the high Irish tax by moving their money offshore to the Caymans. Exchange controls came into effect when Ireland and the Caymans left the sterling area to prevent this sort of transfer, but for the next 10 years, deposits from Ireland to the Cayman Bank grew. Traynor even facilitated funds being redeposited in with Guinness & Mahon in Dublin. The money was nominally held in the name of the Cayman bank, while the bank also often was the named trustee for the offshore funds. This allowed for the bank's customers to claim the money was offshore when it was in fact accessible from Ireland. If the customer needed to withdraw a large sum, it was processed as a loan, secured from the customer's account in the Caymans secretly. These transactions were concealed from inspection, with Traynor keeping "memorandum accounts" that recorded these transactions, with each account associated with a code not a customer's name.

Guinness & Mahon was subject of an onsite inspection from the Central Bank in 1976, and concerns were expressed about the volume of deposits from the Cayman bank which were held in Dublin, totalling more than £14 million. Traynor insisted that no transfers had taken place since the implementation of the exchange controls in 1972. There were further inspections in 1978 and 1982, with further concerns from the Central Bank that it was possible Guinness & Mahon was facilitating tax avoidance. The secrecy of the loan accounts and associated deposits were noted, and again Traynor assured the inspectors no transfers had taken place since 1972. Guinness & Mahon was informed by the Central Bank in 1984 that supervision was likely to be extended to Guinness Mahon Cayman Trust. Before this could happen, Guinness Mahon Cayman Trust was sold to the London parent of Guinness & Mahon. This placed the bank outside the jurisdiction of the Central Bank of Ireland. Further inspections took place in 1986, but did not uncover the memorandum accounts. Throughout this period Traynor operated bank accounts on behalf of Haughey at Guinness & Mahon. A total of £1.7 million was lodged into these accounts. In 1986, Traynor left Guinness & Mahon, remaining chair of Guinness Mahon Cayman Trust, managing deposits from the Caymans from an office on Trinity Street. He was appointed chair of Cement Roadstone Holdings in 1987, continuing to manage the offshore accounts from his office as chair at 42 Fitzwilliam Square. He also served as a director to Aer Lingus from 1982, New Ireland Holdings, and Marlborough Holdings.

In 1988 Traynor, Furze and Collins bought Guinness Mahon Cayman Trust, selling it in August of the same year to the Henry Ansbacher Group. Subsequently renamed Ansbacher Cayman Ltd, all deposits were transferred from this new entity from Guinness & Mahon to Irish Intercontinental Bank, with Traynor continuing to manage the accounts of his clients until his death from cancer on 11 May 1994. After his death, the finances of Haughey were investigated, with the High Court appointing inspectors to investigate the "Ansbacher accounts". The 2002 report listed 179 people and companies for whom Traynor worked. It was not established if all named were involved in illegal activity. Traynor himself paid his personal taxes, and kept his own money in Ireland with the ICS building society. His estate later made a tax settlement of over €4 million.
