= Tony Pro =

American realist painter (born 1973)

- Born: September 1973 (age 52); Northridge, California, U.S.
- Occupation: Painter
- Years active: 1999–present
- Known for: Impressionistic Realism, Western
- Notable work: "Donald Trump" "Bill Murray"

Tony Pro (born September 1973) is an American realist painter known for his paintings of the human figure, still life, and landscapes. He studied art in Westlake Village at the California Art Institute under the illustrator Glen Orbik. In 2005, Pro was awarded the American National Award of Excellence 'Best of Show' at the 14th Annual Oil Painters of America National Show for his painting "Mother's Love". Pro's work hangs in museums, government facilities and private collections around the world.

His painting, "Kenny", of 5-time Grammy Award nominee Kenny Wayne Shepherd adorns the cover of Shepherd's 2014 album, Goin' Home.

In 2016, Pro was featured on Gordon Ramsay's Hell's Kitchen with his portrait of Gordon created for the show.

== Awards ==
- 2014 – 1st place, Portrait Society of America International Competition
- 2005 – Best of Show, Oil Painters of America National Show
