= George Redmond =

George Redmond (c. 1924 – 17 February 2016) was an Irish Assistant City and County Manager until his retirement on 23 June 1989 at the age of 65. He spent his entire career working for the Dublin local authorities commencing as a clerk in Dublin Corporation in 1941.

His net salary in 1989 was £19,380 but he was revealed as a corrupt public official when secret bank accounts were exposed containing amounts equivalent to multiples of his legitimate earnings. He died in at Dublin's Connolly Hospital, after a short illness, aged 92.

== The Mahon Tribunal ==
Redmond was investigated by The Flood Tribunal, subsequently known as The Mahon Tribunal, which revealed Redmond had been storing large sums of money equivalent to multiples of his legitimate income in secret off-shore bank accounts. He had cash deposits in the Isle of Man of £350,000 and £194,000 when the Tribunal investigation got under way. He also operated bank accounts in Ireland using varying versions of his own name in English and Irish.

Matt Gallagher of the Gallagher Group was among the developers who gave Redmond large sums of money, as well as supplying him with a free home and family holidays.

Redmond received a payment of £25,000 from James Gogarty, but his admission of this to the Tribunal was seen as a tactic to divert attention for other payments he received from developers. Following a series of court cases which hinged on the Tribunal withholding material evidence in relation to the Gogarty allegations, in January 2015 the adverse findings concerning many witnesses, including Redmond, were withdrawn and costs, previously refused, were awarded.

The interim reports containing these findings - the third of which concerns the allegations against Redmond alone - were removed from the Tribunal website.

It is unknown whether the second and third interim reports will be formally withdrawn in their entirety.

== Tax evasion ==
Redmond received a tax assessment from the Criminal Assets Bureau for over £500,000 in 1999 based on the identification of up to 20 bank accounts and the lodgements to these over a period of 20 years . The final liability could be in the region of £2 million allowing for interest and penalties.

== Criminal Assets Bureau ==
The Criminal Assets Bureau raided his Castleknock home is February 1999 and discovered a draft letter to Dublin County Council purporting to be from developer Michael Bailey. The letter implied that decisions Redmond was making were based on propositions from a developer but were, in fact, based on his own strategy. Redmond was arrested by members of the Criminal Assets Bureau at Dublin Airport in March 1999 and found to be carrying £300,000 in cash and drafts.

Redmond was remanded on bail on 16 March 2006 on a charge of receiving £10,000 between June 1985 and 1986 as an inducement for doing anything in respect of a compulsory purchase order by Dublin City Council on 167 acres (0.68 km^{2}) of land at Bussardstown and Coolmine.

== Conviction ==
Redmond was convicted in November 2003 and jailed on two counts of corruption involving a £10,000 bribe from a garage owner relating to the sale of a right of way from Dublin County Council at the Lucan by-pass.

This conviction was quashed in July 2004 by the Court of Criminal Appeal on the grounds that had new evidence of bank accounts been available to the trial jury they might have had raised doubts therefore rendering the conviction unsafe. A retrial was not ordered on the grounds that Redmond had served virtually all his sentence.
