= Mick O'Dea =

Irish painter (born 1958)

Mick O'Dea (born 1958) PPRHA is an Irish artist best known as a painter of portraits and historical subjects.

The second-youngest of five children, O'Dea grew up in Ennis, County Clare, the son of Mick and Margaret O'Dea. He displayed a talent for portraiture at a young age, recalling, "I drew incessantly". From 1976 to 1981, O'Dea studied at the National College of Art and Design in Dublin and the University of Massachusetts. He continued his studies in Barcelona and at the Winchester School of Art in England, where he was awarded an M.A. in European Fine Art in 1997.

O'Dea has received numerous awards and has exhibited internationally. Among the public collections in which his works are included are: the National Gallery of Ireland, the Arts Council of Ireland, the Royal Hibernian Academy, the Bank of Ireland, Trinity College Dublin, the University of Limerick, the National Self-Portrait Collection, the National Drawing Collection, and the Limerick City Gallery of Art. He has taught at the National College of Art and Design, Dún Laoghaire Institute of Art, Design and Technology, the National Gallery, Portlaoise Prison, the Lyme Academy College of Fine Art, and the Royal Hibernian Academy, of which he is a member. From 2008 to 2011, he was the first school principal of the RHA. In 2014, he was elected president of the Royal Hibernian Academy. He is a member of Aosdána.

In 2009, O'Dea was commissioned by the National Gallery of Ireland to paint a portrait of playwright Brian Friel. Recent historical themes in his art have included paintings depicting the Black and Tans and the Irish War of Independence.

== Resources ==
- Mick O'Dea, RHA, Clare County Library
- Portrait of a contented man, Independent.ie, 22 July 2012
- Making history, Irish examiner, 22 July 2012
- biography, RHA
- Optical measure, The Irish Times, 23 June 2012
- clip from The Beholder, a documentary about three prominent Irish portrait artists
- Painting donated to University College Cork
- Trouble, The Irish Times, 27 April 2012
- Ministry of Culture unveils portrait of Brian Friel at National Gallery, National Gallery of Ireland
- Portrait of Brian Friel unveiled, Inishowen News, 22 July, 2012
