= Royal Hibernian Academy =

Royal Hibernian Academy of Arts
- An tAcadamh Ibeirneach Ríoga
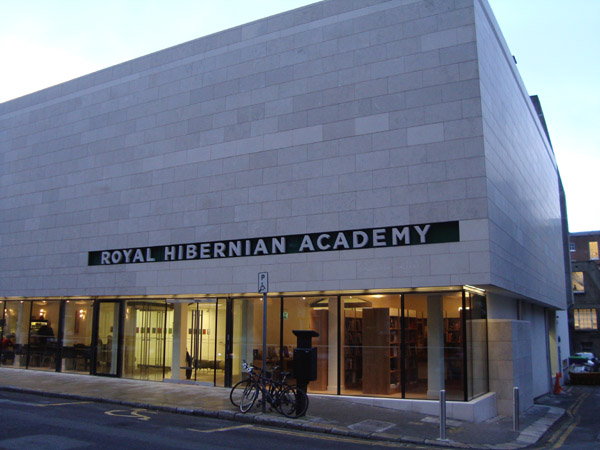

- Location within Central Dublin
- Established: 5 August 1823; 202 years ago
- Location: 15 Ely Place, Dublin, Ireland
- Coordinates: 53.337076°N 6.2568907°W
- Type: Art gallery, Art studios
- Director: Patrick T. Murphy
- President: Dr Abigail O’Brien
- Public transit access: St Stephen's Green
- Website: rhagallery.ie

The Royal Hibernian Academy of Arts (RHA) is an artist-based and artist-oriented institution in Ireland, founded in Dublin in 1823. Like many other Irish institutions, such as the Royal Irish Academy, the academy retained the word "Royal" after most of Ireland became independent as the Irish Free State in December 1922.

== History ==
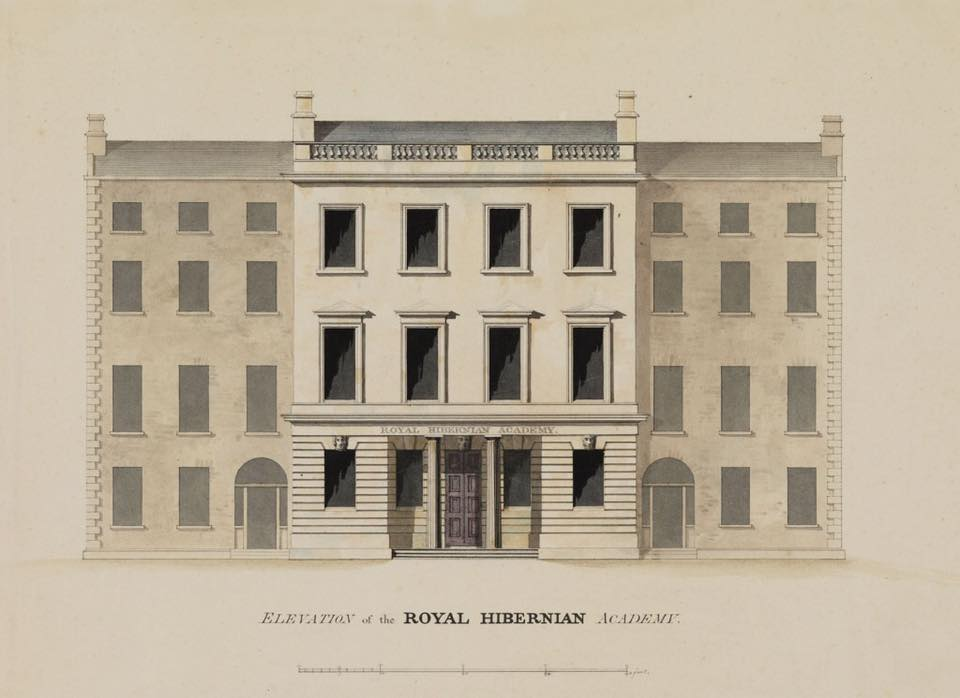
Academy House, Lower Abbey Street, Dublin (1824), mostly destroyed in 1916

The RHA was founded as the result of 30 Irish artists petitioning the government for a charter of incorporation. This having followed exhibitions held by the Dublin Society in 1816, 1817 and 1819 at its premises in Hawkins Street until the premises was sold and the artists were left without a dedicated exhibition space.

According to the letters patent of 5 August 1823, The Royal Hibernian Academy of Painting, Sculpture, and Architecture was established, which included a National School of Art. The first elected president was the landscape painter, William Ashford. In 1824 architect Francis Johnston was made president. He had provided headquarters for the RHA at Academy House in Lower Abbey Street at his own expense. The first exhibitions took place in May 1825 and were held annually from then on. To encourage interest in the arts, works displayed at the RHA were distributed by lot as prizes among subscribers. Works by Frederick William Burton, Daniel Maclise, J. M. W. Turner and David Wilkie, among others, were presented in this way. The exhibitions and school prospered and by the end of the 19th century the RHA was the leading Irish institution involved in promoting visual arts.

Academy House was destroyed by a 1916 fire after being struck by British artillery during the Easter Rising, as was most of the RHA's collection. Over 500 pieces of art, including from artists Jack Butler Yeats, Madeline Green and John Lavery, were lost. The RHA was would not have its own exhibition premises for another 69 years, but continued with its established annual exhibitions.

In 1943, the Irish Exhibition of Living Art (IELA) was founded as a direct challenge to the RHA's exhibition policies, which it saw as reactionary and hindering the development of modernism in Ireland. This later changed, with one of the founders of the IELA, Louis le Brocquy, becoming a member of the Honorary Council of the RHA. The RHA's current mission statement explicitly values both contemporary and traditional art forms.

In the 1970s the RHA constructed a new building in Ely Place in Dublin. This building replaced the gallery's previous premises, a Victorian house that had been home to Oliver St. John Gogarty. This was demolished and the property developer, Matt Gallagher, agreed to build a modern gallery on the site for the RHA. After the sudden death of Gallagher in January 1974, it emerged that he had left no provision in his will for the completion of the gallery. The building lay unfinished for a number of years before it was completed. The building was closed between 2007 and 2009 for renovations. This building houses six galleries; here the Academy mounts the annual exhibition. In addition, the Academy curates frequent exhibitions and frequently is responsible for major retrospectives of the work of Irish artists. The Academy has a large collection of Irish art, but this is not on display.

In 2009 the RHA refounded its school, the RHA drawing school. In Ely Place, it has a large drawing studio and 6 studios which are available to artists through open submissions. Other studios are also administered by the school, such as the Tony O'Malley residency in Kilkenny. It runs TUD-accredited courses (since 2018) in Painting and drawing techniques delivered by a faculty made up of Academy members and other artists. Current tutors are Colin Martin RHA (principal), Mick O'Dea PPRHA, Una Sealy RHA, Blaise Smith RHA, Geraldine O'Neill RHA, Sahoko Blake, Conor Walton, Raphael Hynes and Sean Molloy among others. It also holds workshops with international tutors and self-directed life-drawing sessions.

The Academy is funded by: the Arts Council, through revenue from its annual exhibition, and from benefactors, patrons and friends of the Academy.

== Selected exhibitions ==
The RHA has held an annual exhibition – an open submission art show – since 1826. It is "the largest in Ireland and the longest-running".

FUTURES (originally EuroJet Futures) is an ongoing series of exhibitions featuring selected emerging artists from Ireland. It began in 2001 and has had three series – each with annual exhibitions. Additionally, each series has had an 'anthology' presenting all of the artists from that series together.

== Membership ==
The Academy recognises members, who may use "RHA", associate members "ARHA", and Honorary Council members "HRHA".

== See also ==
- Irish art
