= Charlie McConalogue =

Irish politician (born 1977)

Charlie McConalogue TD
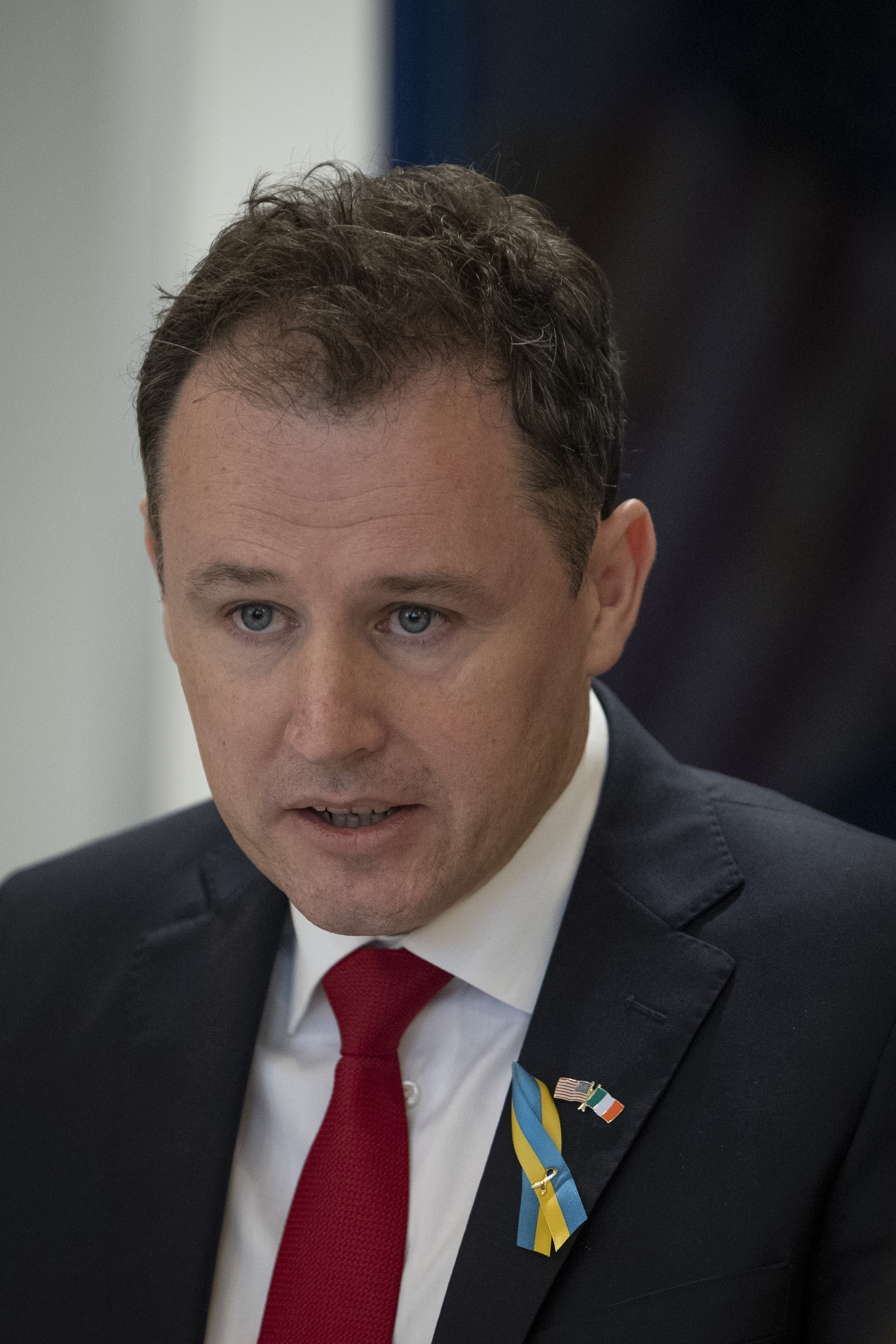
- McConalogue in 2022

Minister of State
- 2025–: Culture, Communications and Sport
- 2020: Justice

Minister for Agriculture, Food and the Marine
- In office 2 September 2020 – 23 January 2025
- Taoiseach: Micheál Martin; Leo Varadkar; Simon Harris
- Preceded by: Micheál Martin (acting)
- Succeeded by: Martin Heydon

Teachta Dála
- Incumbent
- Assumed office February 2016
- Constituency: Donegal
- In office February 2011 – February 2016
- Constituency: Donegal North-East

Personal details
- Born: Charles McConalogue; 29 October 1977 (age 48) Letterkenny, County Donegal, Ireland
- Party: Fianna Fáil
- Education: University College Dublin

Charles McConalogue (born 29 October 1977) is an Irish Fianna Fáil politician who has served as Minister of State at the Department of Culture, Communications and Sport since January 2025. He previously served as Minister for Agriculture, Food and the Marine from September 2020 to January 2025 and Minister of State at the Department of Justice from July 2020 to September 2020. He has been a Teachta Dála (TD) for the Donegal constituency since the 2016 general election, and previously from 2011 to 2016 for the Donegal North-East constituency.

== Early life ==
McConalogue has a degree in economics, politics and history from University College Dublin (UCD), which he completed after a year as Education Officer in the UCD Students' Union. After graduation, he worked as a political organiser at the Fianna Fáil HQ in Dublin. Upon the death of his father, he returned home to manage the family farm near Carndonagh in the north of Inishowen, County Donegal.

He was raised near Gleneely, a village in the north of Inishowen, and was in Australia before returning to the farm. He is married with two sons.

== Political career ==
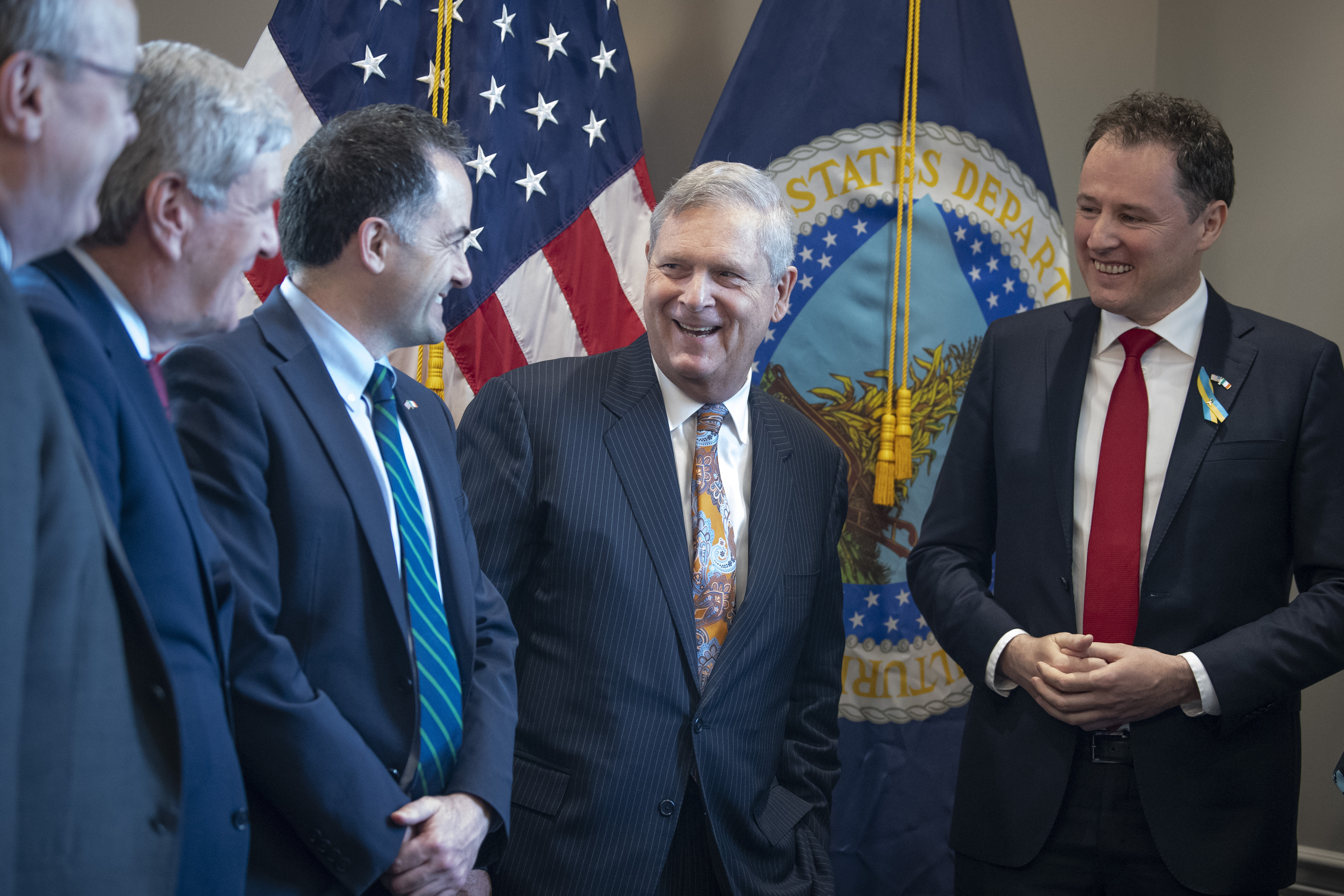
McConalogue met with US Agriculture Secretary Tom Vilsack in Washington, D.C. in April 2022.

McConalogue was elected to Donegal County Council at the 2009 local elections to represent the Inishowen local electoral area.

After Jim McDaid's retirement and Niall Blaney's decision to step down from politics for personal reasons, Fianna Fáil had no sitting TD in Donegal North-East to contest the 2011 general election. The party chose McConalogue as Fianna Fáil's sole candidate for the constituency.

In the election, he won 17.4% of the first-preference vote and was elected on the 9th count to fill the third and final seat, behind Sinn Féin's Pádraig Mac Lochlainn and Fine Gael's Joe McHugh. He was the Fianna Fáil spokesperson on Children from April 2011 to July 2012. In July 2012, he was appointed as party spokesperson on Education and Skills.

In the 2016 general election, after a redrawing of constituency boundaries, McConalogue ran alongside Pat "the Cope" Gallagher as one of two Fianna Fáil candidates in the new five-seater Donegal constituency. McConalogue topped the poll and was elected on the first count.

He represented Fianna Fáil in talks on government formation in 2016.

On 1 July 2020, McConalogue was appointed as a Minister of State at the Department of Justice with responsibility for law reform. On 2 September that year, he was appointed as Minister for Agriculture, Food and the Marine, with the vacancy having arisen following the Oireachtas Golf Society scandal.

It emerged in December 2020 that McConalogue had tested positive for COVID-19 after returning from Brussels on 17 December, prompting all ministers in the Government to restrict their movements. The initial result was negative. He went shopping in Dublin hours ahead of a scheduled five-day follow-up COVID-19 test which led to the positive result he received on 23 December. He displayed no symptoms and isolated in his native Donegal.

McConalogue had been due to travel to Canada for St Patrick's Day in March 2022. However, he later confirmed that a positive COVID-19 test had prevented him from doing so. His period of isolation elapsed in time for him to sit on the "VIP lorry" at the parade in Buncrana.

On 17 December 2022, he was re-appointed to the same position following Leo Varadkar's appointment as Taoiseach.

At the 2024 general election, McConalogue was re-elected to the Dáil. He was not re-appointed as a senior cabinet minister in January 2025. On 29 January 2025, he was appointed as Minister of State at the Department of Culture, Communications and Sport with special responsibility for sport and postal policy.

Political offices
| New office | Minister of State at the Department of Justice; 2020 | Succeeded by James Browne |
| Preceded by Micheál Martin (acting) | Minister for Agriculture, Food and the Marine; 2020–2025 | Succeeded by Martin Heydon |
| New office | Minister of State at the Department of Culture, Communications and Sport; 2025–present | Incumbent |

| Dáil | Election | Deputy (Party) | Deputy (Party) | Deputy (Party) |
|---|---|---|---|---|
| 17th | 1961 | Liam Cunningham (FF) | Neil Blaney (IFF) | Paddy Harte (FG) |
| 18th | 1965 | Liam Cunningham (FF) | Neil Blaney (IFF) | Paddy Harte (FG) |
| 19th | 1969 | Liam Cunningham (FF) | Neil Blaney (IFF) | Paddy Harte (FG) |
| 20th | 1973 | Liam Cunningham (FF) | Neil Blaney (IFF) | Paddy Harte (FG) |
| 20th | 1976 by-election | Paddy Keaveney (IFF) | Neil Blaney (IFF) | Paddy Harte (FG) |
| 21st | 1977 | Constituency abolished. See Donegal | | |
| 22nd | 1981 | Hugh Conaghan (FF) | Neil Blaney (IFF) | Paddy Harte (FG) |
| 23rd | 1982 (Feb) | Hugh Conaghan (FF) | Neil Blaney (IFF) | Paddy Harte (FG) |
| 24th | 1982 (Nov) | Hugh Conaghan (FF) | Neil Blaney (IFF) | Paddy Harte (FG) |
| 25th | 1987 | Hugh Conaghan (FF) | Neil Blaney (IFF) | Paddy Harte (FG) |
| 26th | 1989 | Jim McDaid (FF) | Neil Blaney (IFF) | Paddy Harte (FG) |
| 27th | 1992 | Jim McDaid (FF) | Neil Blaney (IFF) | Paddy Harte (FG) |
| 27th | 1996 by-election | Jim McDaid (FF) | Cecilia Keaveney (FF) | Paddy Harte (FG) |
| 28th | 1997 | Jim McDaid (FF) | Cecilia Keaveney (FF) | Harry Blaney (IFF) |
| 29th | 2002 | Jim McDaid (FF) | Cecilia Keaveney (FF) | Niall Blaney (IFF) |
| 30th | 2007 | Jim McDaid (FF) | Joe McHugh (FG) | Niall Blaney (FF) |
| 31st | 2011 | Charlie McConalogue (FF) | Joe McHugh (FG) | Pádraig Mac Lochlainn (SF) |
| 32nd | 2016 | Constituency abolished. See Donegal | | |

| Dáil | Election | Deputy (Party) | Deputy (Party) | Deputy (Party) | Deputy (Party) | Deputy (Party) | Deputy (Party) | Deputy (Party) | Deputy (Party) |
|---|---|---|---|---|---|---|---|---|---|
| 2nd | 1921 | Joseph O'Doherty (SF) | Samuel O'Flaherty (SF) | Patrick McGoldrick (SF) | Joseph McGinley (SF) | Joseph Sweeney (SF) | Peter Ward (SF) | 6 seats 1921–1923 | |
| 3rd | 1922 | Joseph O'Doherty (AT-SF) | Samuel O'Flaherty (AT-SF) | Patrick McGoldrick (PT-SF) | Joseph McGinley (PT-SF) | Joseph Sweeney (PT-SF) | Peter Ward (PT-SF) | 6 seats 1921–1923 | |
| 4th | 1923 | Joseph O'Doherty (Rep) | Peadar O'Donnell (Rep) | Patrick McGoldrick (CnaG) | Eugene Doherty (CnaG) | Patrick McFadden (CnaG) | Peter Ward (CnaG) | James Myles (Ind.) | John White (FP) |
| 4th | 1924 by-election | Joseph O'Doherty (Rep) | Peadar O'Donnell (Rep) | Patrick McGoldrick (CnaG) | Eugene Doherty (CnaG) | Patrick McFadden (CnaG) | Denis McCullough (CnaG) | James Myles (Ind.) | John White (FP) |
| 5th | 1927 (Jun) | Frank Carney (FF) | Neal Blaney (FF) | Daniel McMenamin (NL) | Eugene Doherty (CnaG) | Michael Óg McFadden (CnaG) | Hugh Law (CnaG) | James Myles (Ind.) | John White (FP) |
| 6th | 1927 (Sep) | Frank Carney (FF) | Neal Blaney (FF) | Archie Cassidy (Lab) | Eugene Doherty (CnaG) | Michael Óg McFadden (CnaG) | Hugh Law (CnaG) | James Myles (Ind.) | John White (FP) |
| 7th | 1932 | Frank Carney (FF) | Neal Blaney (FF) | Brian Brady (FF) | Eugene Doherty (CnaG) | Daniel McMenamin (CnaG) | James Dillon (Ind.) | James Myles (Ind.) | John White (CnaG) |
| 8th | 1933 | Joseph O'Doherty (FF) | Neal Blaney (FF) | Brian Brady (FF) | Hugh Doherty (FF) | Daniel McMenamin (CnaG) | James Dillon (NCP) | James Myles (Ind.) | Michael Óg McFadden (CnaG) |
| 9th | 1937 | Constituency abolished. See Donegal East and Donegal West | | | | | | | |

| Dáil | Election | Deputy (Party) | Deputy (Party) | Deputy (Party) | Deputy (Party) | Deputy (Party) |
|---|---|---|---|---|---|---|
| 21st | 1977 | Hugh Conaghan (FF) | Joseph Brennan (FF) | Neil Blaney (IFF) | James White (FG) | Paddy Harte (FG) |
| 21st | 1980 by-election | Hugh Conaghan (FF) | Clement Coughlan (FF) | Neil Blaney (IFF) | James White (FG) | Paddy Harte (FG) |
| 22nd | 1981 | Constituency abolished. See Donegal North-East and Donegal South-West | | | | |

| Dáil | Election | Deputy (Party) | Deputy (Party) | Deputy (Party) | Deputy (Party) | Deputy (Party) |
|---|---|---|---|---|---|---|
| 32nd | 2016 | Pearse Doherty (SF) | Pat "the Cope" Gallagher (FF) | Thomas Pringle (Ind.) | Charlie McConalogue (FF) | Joe McHugh (FG) |
| 33rd | 2020 | Pearse Doherty (SF) | Pádraig Mac Lochlainn (SF) | Thomas Pringle (Ind.) | Charlie McConalogue (FF) | Joe McHugh (FG) |
| 34th | 2024 | Pearse Doherty (SF) | Pádraig Mac Lochlainn (SF) | Charles Ward (100%R) | Charlie McConalogue (FF) | Pat "the Cope" Gallagher (FF) |
