= Paddy Harte =

Irish politician (1931–2018)

Minister of State
- 1981–1982: Posts and Telegraphs

Teachta Dála
- In office June 1981 – June 1997
- Constituency: Donegal North-East
- In office July 1977 – June 1981
- Constituency: Donegal
- In office October 1961 – July 1977
- Constituency: Donegal North-East

Personal details
- Born: 26 July 1931 Lifford, County Donegal, Ireland
- Died: 8 January 2018 (aged 86) Lifford, County Donegal, Ireland
- Party: Fine Gael
- Spouse: Rosaleen Harte (m. 1953)
- Children: 9, including Jimmy
- Occupation: Butcher

Patrick Harte OBE (26 July 1931 – 8 January 2018) was an Irish Fine Gael politician who served for 36 years as Teachta Dála (TD) for Donegal North-East.

== Early life and family ==
He was born in 1931 in Lifford, County Donegal. His son, Jimmy Harte, is a former Labour Party Senator.

== Political career ==
He was first elected to the 17th Dáil at the 1961 general election, and re-elected at eleven further general elections. From 1981 to 1982, he was Minister of State at the Department of Posts and Telegraphs in Taoiseach Garret FitzGerald's government. At the 1989 European Parliament election, he was an unsuccessful candidate in the Connacht–Ulster constituency. He temporarily lost the Fine Gael whip when he abstained in a vote on the Regulation of Information (Services Outside the State For Termination of Pregnancies) Bill 1995 proposed by the government.

He lost his seat at the 1997 general election to the Independent Fianna Fáil candidate Harry Blaney, and unsuccessfully contested the 1997 election to the 21st Seanad for the Industrial and Commercial Panel. After this, he retired from politics.

== Post-retirement ==
After his retirement, he was involved in a number of projects, including (along with Glenn Barr) the Messines Island of Ireland Peace Park in West Flanders in Belgium. This park was officially opened in November 1998 by President Mary McAleese, Queen Elizabeth II and King Albert II of Belgium to commemorate all Irishmen who died in World War I.

Harte died the morning of 8 January 2018 at the age of 86. The Dáil heard tributes to him in December 2018.

== Awards ==
He was appointed an Honorary OBE in October 2006 for his ecumenical works. He received an honorary doctorate of laws from the National University of Ireland in September 2007 in recognition of his contribution to politics.

== Publications ==
- Harte, Paddy (2005). Young Tigers and Mongrel Foxes: A life in politics. Dublin: The O'Brien Press.

Political offices
Preceded by Mark Killilea Jnr	Minister of State at the Department of Posts and Telegraphs; 1981–1982	Succeeded by Terry Leyden

Dáil	Election	Deputy (Party)	Deputy (Party)	Deputy (Party)	Deputy (Party)	Deputy (Party)	Deputy (Party)	Deputy (Party)	Deputy (Party)
2nd	1921	Joseph O'Doherty (SF)	Samuel O'Flaherty (SF)	Patrick McGoldrick (SF)	Joseph McGinley (SF)	Joseph Sweeney (SF)	Peter Ward (SF)	6 seats 1921–1923	
3rd	1922	Joseph O'Doherty (AT-SF)	Samuel O'Flaherty (AT-SF)	Patrick McGoldrick (PT-SF)	Joseph McGinley (PT-SF)	Joseph Sweeney (PT-SF)	Peter Ward (PT-SF)	6 seats 1921–1923	
4th	1923	Joseph O'Doherty (Rep)	Peadar O'Donnell (Rep)	Patrick McGoldrick (CnaG)	Eugene Doherty (CnaG)	Patrick McFadden (CnaG)	Peter Ward (CnaG)	James Myles (Ind.)	John White (FP)
4th	1924 by-election	Joseph O'Doherty (Rep)	Peadar O'Donnell (Rep)	Patrick McGoldrick (CnaG)	Eugene Doherty (CnaG)	Patrick McFadden (CnaG)	Denis McCullough (CnaG)	James Myles (Ind.)	John White (FP)
5th	1927 (Jun)	Frank Carney (FF)	Neal Blaney (FF)	Daniel McMenamin (NL)	Eugene Doherty (CnaG)	Michael Óg McFadden (CnaG)	Hugh Law (CnaG)	James Myles (Ind.)	John White (FP)
6th	1927 (Sep)	Frank Carney (FF)	Neal Blaney (FF)	Archie Cassidy (Lab)	Eugene Doherty (CnaG)	Michael Óg McFadden (CnaG)	Hugh Law (CnaG)	James Myles (Ind.)	John White (FP)
7th	1932	Frank Carney (FF)	Neal Blaney (FF)	Brian Brady (FF)	Eugene Doherty (CnaG)	Daniel McMenamin (CnaG)	James Dillon (Ind.)	James Myles (Ind.)	John White (CnaG)
8th	1933	Joseph O'Doherty (FF)	Neal Blaney (FF)	Brian Brady (FF)	Hugh Doherty (FF)	Daniel McMenamin (CnaG)	James Dillon (NCP)	James Myles (Ind.)	Michael Óg McFadden (CnaG)
9th	1937	Constituency abolished. See Donegal East and Donegal West							

Dáil	Election	Deputy (Party)	Deputy (Party)	Deputy (Party)	Deputy (Party)	Deputy (Party)
21st	1977	Hugh Conaghan (FF)	Joseph Brennan (FF)	Neil Blaney (IFF)	James White (FG)	Paddy Harte (FG)
21st	1980 by-election	Hugh Conaghan (FF)	Clement Coughlan (FF)	Neil Blaney (IFF)	James White (FG)	Paddy Harte (FG)
22nd	1981	Constituency abolished. See Donegal North-East and Donegal South-West				

Dáil	Election	Deputy (Party)	Deputy (Party)	Deputy (Party)	Deputy (Party)	Deputy (Party)
32nd	2016	Pearse Doherty (SF)	Pat "the Cope" Gallagher (FF)	Thomas Pringle (Ind.)	Charlie McConalogue (FF)	Joe McHugh (FG)
33rd	2020	Pearse Doherty (SF)	Pádraig Mac Lochlainn (SF)	Thomas Pringle (Ind.)	Charlie McConalogue (FF)	Joe McHugh (FG)
34th	2024	Pearse Doherty (SF)	Pádraig Mac Lochlainn (SF)	Charles Ward (100%R)	Charlie McConalogue (FF)	Pat "the Cope" Gallagher (FF)

Dáil	Election	Deputy (Party)	Deputy (Party)	Deputy (Party)
17th	1961	Liam Cunningham (FF)	Neil Blaney (IFF)	Paddy Harte (FG)
18th	1965	Liam Cunningham (FF)	Neil Blaney (IFF)	Paddy Harte (FG)
19th	1969	Liam Cunningham (FF)	Neil Blaney (IFF)	Paddy Harte (FG)
20th	1973	Liam Cunningham (FF)	Neil Blaney (IFF)	Paddy Harte (FG)
20th	1976 by-election	Paddy Keaveney (IFF)	Neil Blaney (IFF)	Paddy Harte (FG)
21st	1977	Constituency abolished. See Donegal		
22nd	1981	Hugh Conaghan (FF)	Neil Blaney (IFF)	Paddy Harte (FG)
23rd	1982 (Feb)	Hugh Conaghan (FF)	Neil Blaney (IFF)	Paddy Harte (FG)
24th	1982 (Nov)	Hugh Conaghan (FF)	Neil Blaney (IFF)	Paddy Harte (FG)
25th	1987	Hugh Conaghan (FF)	Neil Blaney (IFF)	Paddy Harte (FG)
26th	1989	Jim McDaid (FF)	Neil Blaney (IFF)	Paddy Harte (FG)
27th	1992	Jim McDaid (FF)	Neil Blaney (IFF)	Paddy Harte (FG)
27th	1996 by-election	Jim McDaid (FF)	Cecilia Keaveney (FF)	Paddy Harte (FG)
28th	1997	Jim McDaid (FF)	Cecilia Keaveney (FF)	Harry Blaney (IFF)
29th	2002	Jim McDaid (FF)	Cecilia Keaveney (FF)	Niall Blaney (IFF)
30th	2007	Jim McDaid (FF)	Joe McHugh (FG)	Niall Blaney (FF)
31st	2011	Charlie McConalogue (FF)	Joe McHugh (FG)	Pádraig Mac Lochlainn (SF)
32nd	2016	Constituency abolished. See Donegal		
