= Harry Blaney =

Irish politician (1928–2013)

- Blaney, c. late 2000s

Leader of Independent Fianna Fáil
- In office 1995–2006
- Preceded by: Neil Blaney
- Succeeded by: Party dissolved

Teachta Dála
- In office June 1997 – May 2002
- Constituency: Donegal North-East

Personal details
- Born: 18 February 1928 Fanad, County Donegal, Ireland
- Died: 29 April 2013 (aged 85) County Donegal, Ireland
- Party: Independent Fianna Fáil
- Spouse: Margaret Blaney
- Children: 7, including Niall
- Parent: Neal Blaney (father)
- Relatives: Neil Blaney (brother)

Harry Blaney (18 February 1928 – 29 April 2013) was an Irish politician from Fanad, County Donegal, best known as a leading figure in Independent Fianna Fáil (IFF), the breakaway organisation founded by his brother Neil Blaney following his 1970 expulsion from Fianna Fáil over the Arms Crisis. A long-serving Donegal County Councillor and Teachta Dála (TD) for Donegal North-East between 1997 and 2002, Blaney was noted for his intense local focus, Irish republican sympathies, and conservative social views.

Born into a prominent political family, Blaney helped build a formidable electoral machine in north Donegal alongside his brother during the 1950s. After Neil entered the cabinet in 1957, Harry succeeded him on the county council, where he was known for strong advocacy of local infrastructure, housing, and rural development. Following Neil's death in 1995, Harry became leader of Independent Fianna Fáil and was elected to the Dáil two years later, where his support helped sustain the Fianna Fáil–Progressive Democrats coalition government.

Blaney's politics combined traditional republicanism with populist localism. He opposed the Anglo-Irish Agreement and extradition to Northern Ireland, supported recognition of political status for republican prisoners, and objected to the Good Friday Agreement on the grounds that it weakened Ireland's constitutional claim to Northern Ireland. Socially, he was conservative, opposing divorce, abortion, and contraceptives. He also denied that sexual abuse by Catholic priests had occurred in Donegal. Despite limited parliamentary activity, he retained influence through his reputation as a constituency politician.

Blaney remained active in local politics until his death, and his family's influence in Donegal continued through his son Niall Blaney, who served as a Fianna Fáil TD and later as a senator. The Harry Blaney Bridge, opened in 2009 to connect the Fanad and Rosguill peninsulas, was named in his honour.

== Early life ==
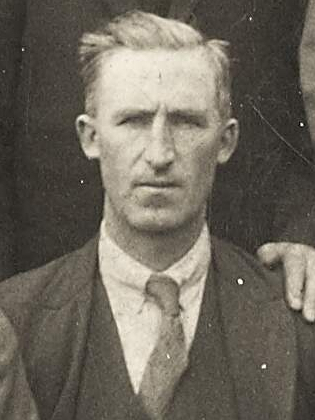
Harry's father Neal Blaney in 1927

Harry Blaney was born on 18 February 1928 in Rossnakill on the Fanad Peninsula, County Donegal, one of eleven children of Fianna Fáil TD Neal Blaney and his wife Nora Sweeney. His father had been an IRA commander during the War of Irish Independence and the subsequent Irish Civil War. Blaney claimed to have memories of his father being hoisted up onto the shoulders of supporters following his win at the 1932 general election. Blaney himself became involved in politics at the age of fifteen, canvassing and postering during the 1943 general election. Educated locally, he preferred outdoor work to academics, spending much of his time farming and playing soccer for Swilly Rovers. In October 1950, he had a trial with Glasgow Celtic, and three years later, he was part of the Swilly Rovers team that won the 1953 FAI Junior Cup. He later helped found Fanad United and organised the Donegal sports star awards.

Following the early deaths of his parents, Blaney took over the family farm in Rossnakill. While most of his siblings moved away, he remained there for life, running a mixed farm of cattle and potatoes from the thatched cottage in which he was raised.

To supplement his income, Blaney worked for the Department of Posts and Telegraphs from 1953 to 1956, as an artificial insemination technician with the North-West Cattle Breeders' Association from 1956 to 1959, and later as a cattle ear-tagger with the Department of Agriculture's bovine TB eradication scheme. In July 1965, he married Margaret Conaghan, whom he met while working for the department, and they had five daughters and two sons. He later combined farming with running the Milford Inn pub.

== Political career ==
=== Fianna Fáil ===
After Neil Blaney inherited their father's Dáil seat in 1948, he and his brother Harry built a strong political organisation centred in the Fanad and Milford areas of Donegal. Harry acted as organiser-in-chief, known for his friendly manner, deep local knowledge, and habit of noting constituents' concerns in a small notebook. In contrast to his more reserved and teetotal brother, Harry was considered sociable and outgoing.

Between 1948 and 1957, Neil and Harry Blaney built a highly organised political machine in Donegal, drawing on their father’s former supporters and their own extended family. They established an extensive network of party branches (cumann) through which local leaders acted as intermediaries between the Blaneys and their constituents. These leaders handled routine matters, while the brothers reserved their own intervention for more difficult cases. Personal loyalty within the organisation was strengthened by the use of state patronage.

When Neil became a cabinet minister in 1957, Harry succeeded him on Donegal County Council, representing the Milford electoral area. He regularly advocated for improvements in local infrastructure, housing, and economic development, using both Neil’s national influence and the expanding economy to deliver benefits to his constituents. Although widely regarded as a conscientious and community-focused representative, he also earned a reputation for firmly suppressing potential rivals.

During the 1960s, Blaney was among the Donegal Fianna Fáil activists sent around the country to assist in by-election campaigns and served as chairman of Donegal County Council from 1967 to 1968.

The outbreak of the Troubles in Northern Ireland and Neil Blaney's subsequent involvement in the 1970 Arms Crisis led to serious divisions within the Donegal section of Fianna Fáil. A former ally, Senator Bernard McGlinchey, sided with the party leadership against the Blaneys. During the 1971 Public Accounts Committee inquiry following the arms trials, the head of Special Branch alleged that Neil and Harry Blaney had provided the Provisional IRA with money and arms from September 1969. Neil pointed out that Harry had never been detained or questioned in connection with these claims. After being refused permission for his solicitor to cross-examine the witness, Harry denied the allegations before the committee, calling the witness "a liar himself [or] listening to people who had been telling lies" and claiming that the "unconstitutional" inquiry was intended to discredit opponents of Taoiseach Jack Lynch ahead of the Fianna Fáil ard fheis.

=== Independent Fianna Fáil ===
In June 1972, Harry Blaney denounced his brother Neil's expulsion from Fianna Fáil as illegal. Plans began soon after to form a separate organisation centred around the Blaneys, while Harry accused supporters of Taoiseach Jack Lynch of creating fake branches and purging those loyal to Neil. In May 1973, Harry, along with four other county councillors and three urban councillors, were expelled for backing Neil's independent candidacy in the 1973 general election. This group became the nucleus of Independent Fianna Fáil (IFF), founded later that year. The new party combined hardline republican views, regularly demanding that Britain set a deadline for withdrawal from Northern Ireland, with clientelist politics rooted in Donegal localism and resentment at perceived economic neglect.

The 1973 election in Donegal was particularally fierce following the split in Fianna Fáil: One former Donegal TD recalled how Harry Blaney maintained a fiercely competitive relationship with Bernard McGlinchey during the period. The TD claimed that McGlinchey, running for Fianna Fáil, was warned that there was no point canvassing in Fanad, which was regarded as "Blaney Country". Undeterred, he entered the area with a Fianna Fáil cavalcade but quickly withdrew after a shot was fired at the group. Years later, McGlinchey jokingly asked Harry if he had been the one who fired the shot. "No," Harry replied, "and I can prove it". When McGlinchey asked how, Blaney answered, "I wouldn't have missed".

In July 1974, Fine Gael and Fianna Fáil excluded IFF councillors from all council committees. The IFF members nonetheless secured representation on the general purposes committee by obstructing council business. During the following years, Blaney championed the interests of Donegal farmers and workers, pressing for the dismissal of council officials rather than labourers, lobbying for European funds for land drainage, and strongly supporting Section 4 motions allowing one-off rural housing. He also took part in demonstrations opposing the denial of political status to republican prisoners in the Maze and called for the expulsion of the British ambassador.

Throughout the 1980s, IFF maintained close cooperation with Provisional Sinn Féin, both inside and outside the council chamber, opposing the cost of border security and criticising Garda searches in Fanad. When Charles Haughey became Fianna Fáil leader, Neil Blaney's support for his 1982 minority government led to speculation that IFF might reunite with Fianna Fáil. In 1985, Harry Blaney and Senator Bernard McGlinchey negotiated a local IFF–Fianna Fáil pact, and Blaney became chairman of Donegal County Council from 1986 to 1987.

Haughey later pursued talks on party unity, which intensified after the 1987 general election when Neil Blaney's Dáil vote could have been decisive for a Fianna Fáil minority government. However, Haughey rejected IFF's demands, which included a cabinet post for Neil Blaney, withdrawal from the 1985 Anglo-Irish Agreement, and repeal of Section 31 of the Broadcasting Act prohibiting interviews with members of illegal organisations. Although Neil Blaney supported Haughey's election as Taoiseach, unity talks collapsed after Fine Gael's "Tallaght strategy" reduced IFF's influence. The rift deepened when Haughey accepted the Anglo-Irish Agreement, permitted extradition to Northern Ireland, and introduced strict public spending cuts, which the Blaneys claimed contradicted promises of state investment in the construction sector.

While chairing a 1987 council debate on a motion of sympathy for eight IRA members and a civilian killed at Loughgall, County Armagh, Blaney condemned the government as "rotten to the core...in relation to their actions on Northern Ireland" and said the Anglo-Irish Agreement entrenched partition. His comments provoked angry exchanges and a walk-out by Fianna Fáil and Fine Gael councillors. Relations between IFF and Fianna Fáil deteriorated further as Blaney became chairman of the Donegal anti-extradition committee and publicly accused Chief Justice Tom O'Higgins of "running riot" with the constitution by approving the extradition of Dominic McGlinchey. Gardaí also searched Neil Blaney's cottage on the family farm, and Harry Blaney, on several occasions, posted bail for republicans charged with paramilitary offences. Reflecting later, he said of Haughey that he was "a friend when he wanted to be and was looking for something" but "did not do very much for Donegal".

Blaney served on the North-Western Regional Health Board from 1987 to 1999 and on the Donegal Vocational Education Committee. In June 1988, he stated in an interview with Donegal News that he believed the prevalence of child sexual abuse was being exaggerated, claiming he had never personally encountered such cases. Numerous cases of abuse were later uncovered in County Donegal.

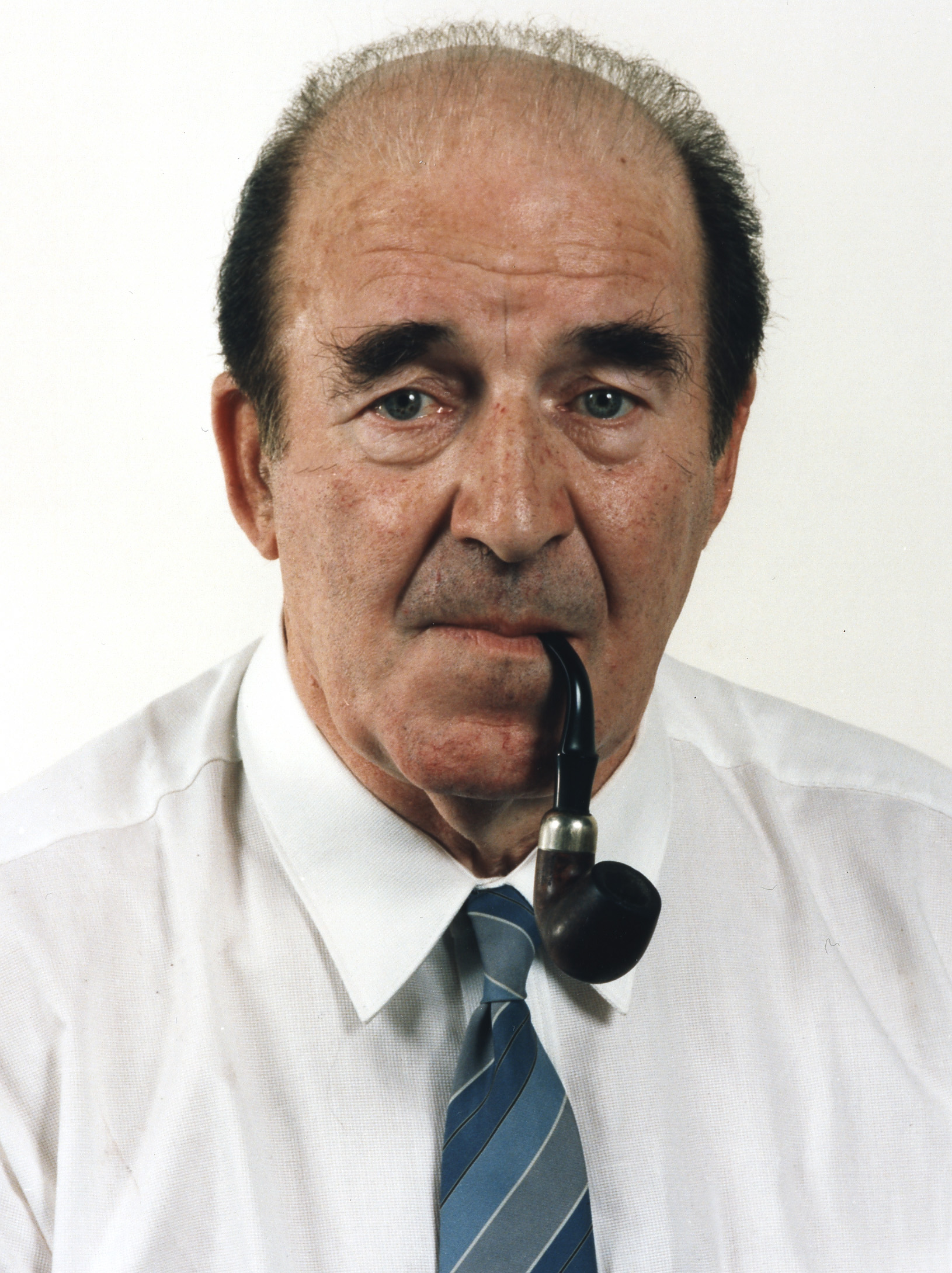
Harry's brother Neil Blaney, seen here in 1990

The resignation of Charles Haughey and the progress of the Northern Ireland peace process led to an improvement in relations between Fianna Fáil and Independent Fianna Fáil. Following Neil Blaney's death in 1995, Harry Blaney assumed leadership of the party and entered into unsuccessful talks with Fianna Fáil about fielding a joint candidate in the ensuing by-election. Blaney was defeated by Cecilia Keaveney of Fianna Fáil at the April 1996 by-election. He called for a recount, but the following day was defeated by 150 votes. Although he was defeated by the Fianna Fáil nominee, Blaney secured a strong vote, and ahead of the 1997 general election, he reorganised the IFF political operation.

==== TD (1997–2002) ====
At the 1997 general election, Harry Blaney won the third seat in Donegal North-East, defeating Paddy Harte of Fine Gael and becoming, at age 69, the oldest first-time TD ever elected. For the following five years, he was one of a small group of independents who supported the Fianna Fáil–Progressive Democrats coalition government led by Bertie Ahern in exchange for local investment and infrastructure projects. In his maiden speech, Blaney highlighted Donegal's underdevelopment and presented Ahern with an eighteen-point list of demands, which included housing, rural road improvements, a regional water scheme, and the construction of a bridge across Mulroy Bay.

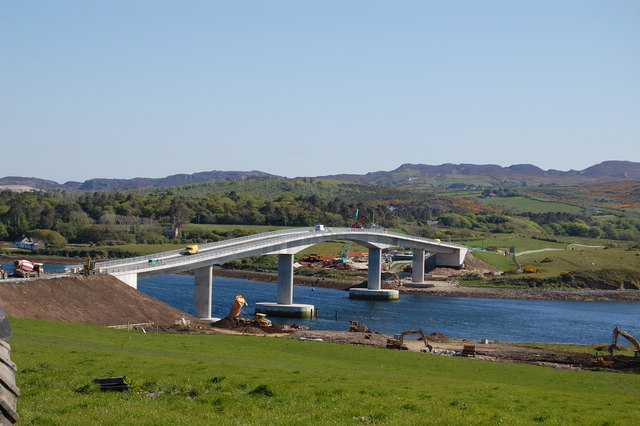
The Harry Blaney Bridge was named in his honour

Blaney had campaigned for the bridge since 1986, arguing it would replace a nearly 50 km detour with a 400-metre crossing between Fanad and Rosguill. To his surprise, Ahern accepted the proposal and the entire list without objection. Completed in 2009 and later named the Harry Blaney Bridge, it was criticised by some as "the bridge to nowhere", with opponents arguing that a bridge over the Swilly at Letterkenny should have taken priority.

During his Dáil term, Blaney spoke infrequently, though he served as vice-chairman of the Joint Oireachtas Committee on Agriculture and Food. He supported the government on nearly all votes, opposing only three of about 400 motions. He briefly considered voting against the 1998 Good Friday Agreement because it removed the Republic's constitutional claim to Northern Ireland, and voted against Irish participation in NATO's Partnership for Peace on neutrality grounds. Blaney also protested against mobile phone masts, resisted changes to licensing laws affecting rural pubs, and continued to call for his brother Neil to be cleared of wrongdoing in the 1970 Arms Crisis. Alongside other pro-government independents, he opposed the abolition of the dual mandate, which allowed TDs to serve simultaneously on local councils.

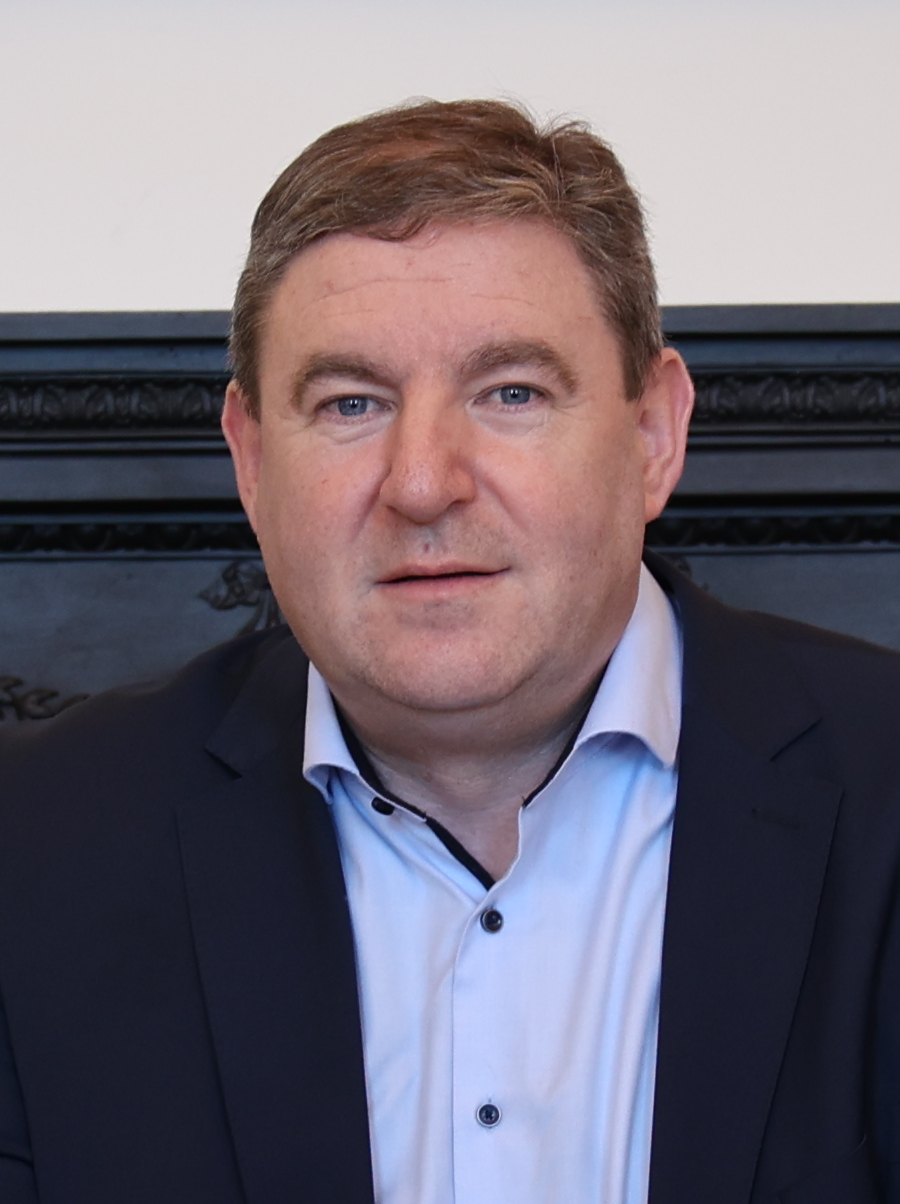
Harry's son Niall Blaney, seen here in 2025

In 1999, Blaney retired from Donegal County Council and related committees, succeeded by his son Niall Blaney.

In May 2001, Blaney publicly rejected allegations that he had supplied guns or cash to the IRA in the lead-up to the 1970 Arms Crisis. He said that whoever had made the claim to then–Special Branch head Chief Superintendent John Fleming was "a liar" and maintained that he had told the 1971 Public Accounts Committee (PAC) he had "neither hand, act or part" in handling the £100,000 government fund for Northern Ireland relief. Blaney recalled that he had directly challenged Fleming to substantiate the accusation that he had given £2,000 to Official IRA chief Cathal Goulding but had "never had any comeback on it". He repeated that the claims, discussed in a secret PAC session, were false. In the same week, Blaney met Taoiseach Bertie Ahern to request the removal of Desmond O'Malley as chair of the Dáil Committee on Foreign Affairs. His demand came amid an ongoing inquiry, ordered by Justice Minister John O'Donoghue, into alleged tampering with a witness statement in the original Arms Trial. Blaney said his meeting with the Taoiseach "was as good as he could have expected" and that a further meeting had been arranged.

At the 2002 general election, Niall succeeded his father as Independent Fianna Fáil TD for Donegal North-East, and was later replaced on the council by his brother Liam. Harry Blaney remained party leader and oversaw secret negotiations leading to Independent Fianna Fáil's reunification with Fianna Fáil in 2006. Although opposed by Neil Blaney's Dublin-based children and some Fianna Fáil members in Donegal, the move reflected declining IFF support as older members died and Sinn Féin gained ground, as well as a softening of differences over Northern Ireland policy. In later life, Blaney remarked that he had never carried county council disputes beyond the council chamber.

== Political views ==
Harry Blaney's political outlook combined republican convictions, social conservatism, and a clientelist approach to politics.

He was an Irish nationalist who opposed the Anglo-Irish Agreement of 1985, supported republican prisoners, and resisted policies seen as legitimising partition or compromising Irish sovereignty. He chaired the Donegal anti-extradition committee, criticised Garda operations against republicans, and condemned government actions he viewed as hostile to the nationalist cause. Although never accused of paramilitary involvement, he publicly defended individuals associated with republican activity and frequently expressed sympathy for their political aims.

Blaney was also a staunch social conservative. He opposed divorce, abortion, and contraception, denounced vasectomy services at Letterkenny Hospital and in 1999 called for a referendum to reverse the 1992 X Case ruling that permitted abortion in limited circumstances.

Economically and administratively, Blaney operated as a traditional rural populist. He supported public spending and local employment, often criticising bureaucrats while defending labourers and small farmers. He enthusiastically used Section 4 motions to enable rural housing, opposed public sector cutbacks, and prioritised local development projects, most notably the Mulroy Bay bridge.

== Personal life ==
He died on 29 April 2013.

== See also ==
- Families in the Oireachtas

Dáil	Election	Deputy (Party)	Deputy (Party)	Deputy (Party)
17th	1961	Liam Cunningham (FF)	Neil Blaney (IFF)	Paddy Harte (FG)
18th	1965	Liam Cunningham (FF)	Neil Blaney (IFF)	Paddy Harte (FG)
19th	1969	Liam Cunningham (FF)	Neil Blaney (IFF)	Paddy Harte (FG)
20th	1973	Liam Cunningham (FF)	Neil Blaney (IFF)	Paddy Harte (FG)
20th	1976 by-election	Paddy Keaveney (IFF)	Neil Blaney (IFF)	Paddy Harte (FG)
21st	1977	Constituency abolished. See Donegal		
22nd	1981	Hugh Conaghan (FF)	Neil Blaney (IFF)	Paddy Harte (FG)
23rd	1982 (Feb)	Hugh Conaghan (FF)	Neil Blaney (IFF)	Paddy Harte (FG)
24th	1982 (Nov)	Hugh Conaghan (FF)	Neil Blaney (IFF)	Paddy Harte (FG)
25th	1987	Hugh Conaghan (FF)	Neil Blaney (IFF)	Paddy Harte (FG)
26th	1989	Jim McDaid (FF)	Neil Blaney (IFF)	Paddy Harte (FG)
27th	1992	Jim McDaid (FF)	Neil Blaney (IFF)	Paddy Harte (FG)
27th	1996 by-election	Jim McDaid (FF)	Cecilia Keaveney (FF)	Paddy Harte (FG)
28th	1997	Jim McDaid (FF)	Cecilia Keaveney (FF)	Harry Blaney (IFF)
29th	2002	Jim McDaid (FF)	Cecilia Keaveney (FF)	Niall Blaney (IFF)
30th	2007	Jim McDaid (FF)	Joe McHugh (FG)	Niall Blaney (FF)
31st	2011	Charlie McConalogue (FF)	Joe McHugh (FG)	Pádraig Mac Lochlainn (SF)
32nd	2016	Constituency abolished. See Donegal		
