= 1996 Donegal North-East by-election =

By-election to the 27th Dáil

- 2 April 1996
- Turnout: 30,625 (60.7%)
	Keaveney	Blaney	Sheridan
Nominee	Cecilia Keaveney	Harry Blaney (Note: Blaney was a member of Independent Fianna Fáil, an unregistered political party, and appeared on the ballot as a non-party independent.)	Jim Sheridan
Party	Fianna Fáil	Independent Fianna Fáil	Fine Gael
First preferences	9,872	8,943	5,679
Percentage	32.2%	29.2%	18.5%
Final count	14,115	13,077	–
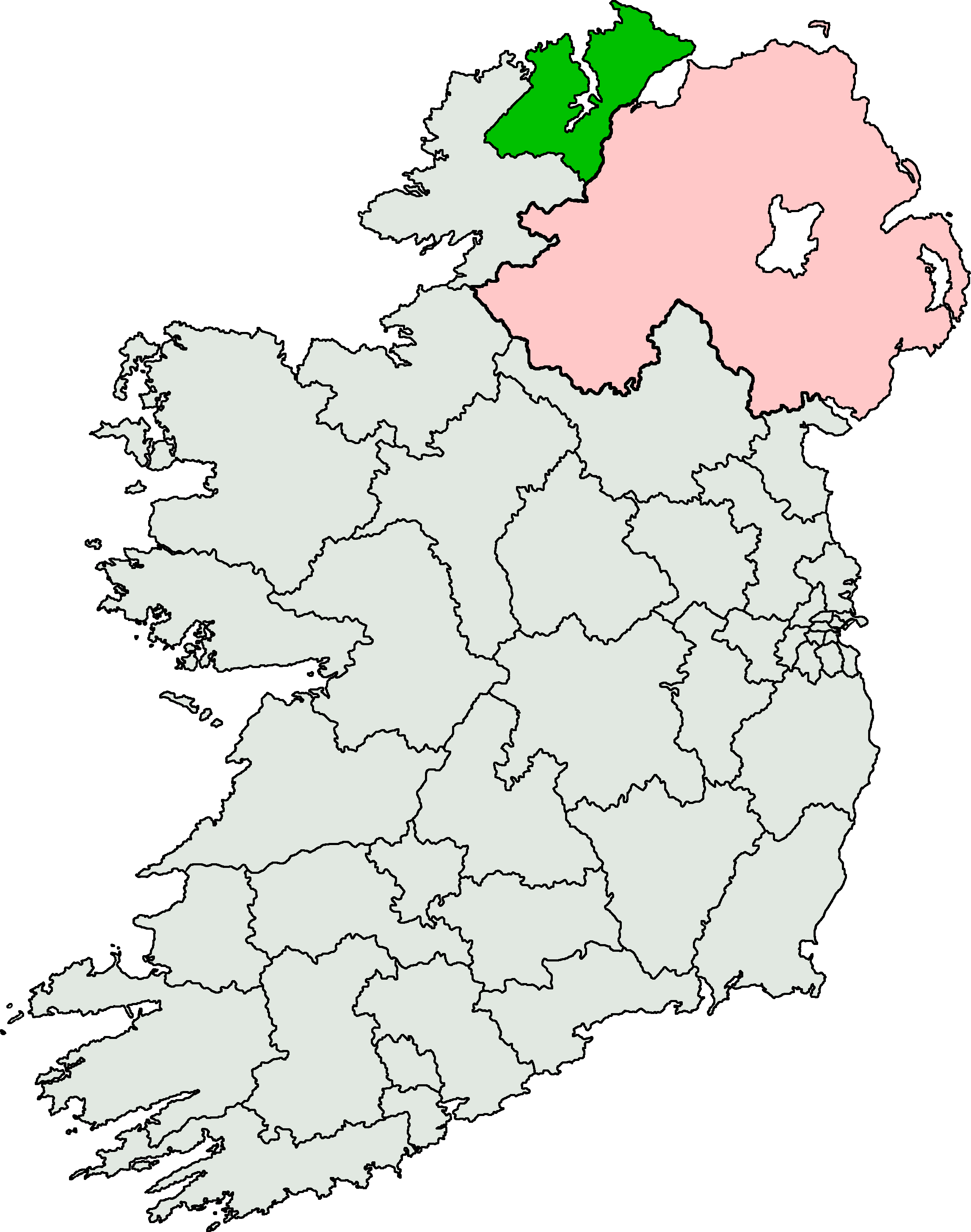
- Donegal North-East shown within Ireland
TD before election
Neil Blaney
Independent Fianna Fáil
TD after election
Cecilia Keaveney
Fianna Fáil

A Dáil by-election was held in the constituency of Donegal North-East in Ireland on Tuesday, 2 April 1996, to fill a vacancy in the 27th Dáil. It followed the death of Independent Fianna Fáil Teachta Dála (TD) Neil Blaney on 8 November 1995.

The writ of election to fill the vacancy was agreed by the Dáil on 12 March 1996.

The by-election was won by the Fianna Fáil candidate Cecilia Keaveney, a member of Donegal County Council.

Among the candidates were Donegal county councillor, Harry Blaney, brother of the deceased TD; Senator and Donegal county councillor Seán Maloney and vice-president of Sinn Féin Pat Doherty

It was held on the same day as the 1996 Dublin West by-election. Both by-elections were won by Fianna Fáil candidates.

At the 1997 general election for Donegal North-East, Keaveney was re-elected and Harry Blaney was elected as an Independent Fianna Fáil TD.

== Result ==
1996 Donegal North-East by-election
Party	Candidate	FPv%	Count			
Party	Candidate	FPv%	1	2	3	4
Fianna Fáil	Cecilia Keaveney	32.2	9,872	10,351	11,454	14,115
Independent Fianna Fáil	Harry Blaney	29.2	8,943	10,208	11,444	13,077
Fine Gael	Jim Sheridan	18.5	5,679	5,813	6,861	
Labour	Seán Maloney	12.4	3,791	4,003		
Sinn Féin	Pat Doherty	7.6	2,340			
Electorate: 50,443 Valid: 30,625 Quota: 15,313 Turnout: 60.7%
