= Seán Maloney (Irish politician) =

Irish former politician (born 1945)

Senator
- In office 17 February 1993 – 17 September 1997
- Constituency: Labour Panel

Personal details
- Born: 9 January 1945 (age 81) County Donegal, Ireland
- Party: Fine Gael; Labour Party
- Relatives: Eamonn Maloney (brother)

Seán Maloney (born 9 January 1945) is an Irish former politician from Letterkenny, County Donegal. Formerly a member of the Labour Party, he joined Fine Gael in 2000.

Maloney unsuccessfully contested the 1992 general election as a Labour Party candidate in the Donegal North-East constituency, but in the subsequent elections to Seanad Éireann he was elected to the Labour Panel to the 20th Seanad. He stood unsuccessfully in the Donegal North-East by-election in April 1996, and he was not elected at the 1997 general election, when his share of the first-preference votes fell from over 11% in 1992 to 5.5%.

He was defeated in subsequent Seanad elections, but in the local elections in 1991 he was elected a member of both Letterkenny Town Council and of Donegal County Council. Sometime after 1999 he left the Labour Party and joined Fine Gael, standing as a Fine Gael candidate for Donegal North-East in the 2002 general election, when he won over 10% of the first-preference votes but was not elected. He did not contest any further elections.

In 1995, he advised the then Minister for the Arts, Culture and the Gaeltacht Michael D. Higgins to view a site in Letterkenny in exchange for a lift to a Labour Party function in Donegal. Higgins visited the Rectory Field, declared it the best site for a theatre he had ever seen and approved a £1.5 million grant the following February for what would become An Grianán Theatre.

He is a brother of Eamonn Maloney who served in Dáil Éireann (2011–2016).
