= Jim McDaid =

Irish former politician (born 1949)

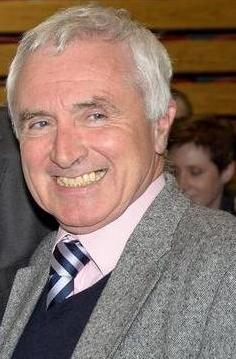

Minister of State
- 2002–2004: Transport

Minister for Tourism, Sport and Recreation
- In office 26 June 1997 – 6 June 2002
- Taoiseach: Bertie Ahern
- Preceded by: Enda Kenny
- Succeeded by: John O'Donoghue

Teachta Dála
- In office June 1989 – 2 November 2010
- Constituency: Donegal North-East

Personal details
- Born: James Joseph McDaid; 3 October 1949 (age 77) Termon, County Donegal, Ireland
- Party: Fianna Fáil
- Spouses: Marguerite McDaid (div.); Siobhan McDaid
- Children: 5
- Education: University College Galway

James Joseph McDaid (born 3 October 1949) is an Irish former Fianna Fáil politician who served as Minister of State for Transport from 2002 to 2004 and Minister for Tourism, Sport and Recreation from 1997 to 2004. He served as a Teachta Dála (TD) for the Donegal North-East constituency from 1989 to 2010.

McDaid has had a concurrent career as a medical doctor and continues to work as a general practitioner in Letterkenny.

== Early life ==
McDaid was born in Termon, County Donegal in 1949. He was educated in St Eunan's College in Letterkenny between 1962 and 1967. He went on to attend University College Galway (UCG), and was conferred with a Bachelor of Medicine, Bachelor of Surgery in 1974. While at University College Galway, he played on the university soccer team that won three national titles, with McDaid captaining the side on two of those occasions. He was Clubman of the Year Award winner in 1972–73.

Between 1974 and 1979, McDaid worked at Letterkenny General Hospital, and in 1979 he went into partnership as a general practitioner in Letterkenny. He also served as a medical officer for the Donegal county football team.

== Political career ==
McDaid was elected to Dáil Éireann on his first attempt at the 1989 general election. He ousted sitting Fianna Fáil TD Hugh Conaghan, and, according to The Irish Times, was selected by the party to run against their own man due to Conaghan's opposition to the leader of Fianna Fáil, Charles Haughey. He was re-elected at each subsequent general election until his resignation from the Dáil in 2010.

In 1991, he was nominated by Taoiseach Charles Haughey to the position of Minister for Defence. On the morning the Dáil was due to debate his appointment, a photograph emerged taken outside Dublin's Four Courts on the day a judge ruled that the Maze Prison escaper, James Pius Clarke, should not be extradited to the United Kingdom. McDaid was seen in the background, smiling broadly. While McDaid stated that his presence at the hearing was due to personal connections – Clarke's mother was a constituent and a patient in his general practice in Letterkenny – the opposition Fine Gael party objected to his appointment and ministers from Fianna Fáil's coalition partners, the Progressive Democrats, indicated their unwillingness to remain in office should McDaid be appointed. McDaid withdrew his name from consideration.

Following Bertie Ahern's election as leader of Fianna Fáil in 1994, McDaid was appointed to the front bench as spokesperson on Equality and Law Reform. When Ahern formed a government after the 1997 election, McDaid was appointed to cabinet as Minister for Tourism, Sport and Recreation. During his tenure he was dubbed the "Minister for Fun", though he presided over weighty issues such as investigations into controversial events such as drugs allegations in sport and sex abuse by swimming coaches. Following the 2002 general election, McDaid was dropped from cabinet, but he was appointed as a Minister of State. He was an unsuccessful candidate for the North-West constituency at the 2004 European Parliament election and was later sacked from his position as Minister of State and returned to the backbenches once again.

In April 2006, McDaid announced that he would retire from public life in favour of returning to his medical practice and would not be standing in the next general election and that politics "no longer held any challenge for him". However, on 27 July 2006, following the announcement that Independent Fianna Fáil TD Niall Blaney had joined the Fianna Fáil party, McDaid reversed this decision, and announced that he would seek nomination as a candidate to contest the 2007 general election. Following the absorption of Independent Fianna Fáil and its sole TD, Niall Blaney into Fianna Fáil, there were then three outgoing Fianna Fáil TDs in the three-seat constituency. Under the electoral system of proportional representation by means of the single transferable vote, it was considered virtually impossible for all three to be elected. Fianna Fáil's Cecilia Keaveney lost her seat to the Fine Gael candidate Joe McHugh, with McDaid and Blaney being the two successful Fianna Fáil candidates.

McDaid told the Irish Independent on 1 June 2007 that he had received no help from Fianna Fáil headquarters during the general election campaign and that the party had treated him as a virtual independent. He warned that, consequently, the party should not take his support in the 30th Dáil for granted. This threat was followed through in November 2008 when he abstained from a vote on the cervical cancer vaccination programme, resulting in his expulsion from the Fianna Fáil parliamentary party.

In April 2010, he said he would not be voluntarily giving up his ministerial pension of €22,487, despite most other TDs and Senators having done so. He said he would not do so "unless it is the express wish of Dáil Éireann". The next month it was reported that he missed more than four out of every five Dáil votes in 2009 – by far the worst record of any TD.

McDaid resigned from the Dáil on 2 November 2010. In his resignation letter, he called for a general election before December 2010 and also accused the Government of taking political soft options and not tackling the real issues.

== Personal life ==
McDaid's private life has long been a source of interest in the Irish media. The breakdown of his marriage, and the subsequent publication of a book by his ex-wife, revealed the details of their troubled marriage and separation. He is divorced from his first wife Marguerite, with whom he had three sons and a daughter.

In April 2005, McDaid was arrested when found driving drunk in the wrong direction on a dual carriageway outside Dublin. Oncoming vehicles were forced to swerve to avoid his car, which was eventually forced to stop when a haulier blocked his path. Tests showed a blood alcohol level of 267 mg, more than three times over the legal limit of 80 mg. He was subsequently convicted of dangerous driving while intoxicated and drunken driving, banned from driving for 2 years and fined €750. However, he was returned his licence after only a year. The case attracted media attention and McDaid was described as "a disgrace" and "an idiot". He acknowledged that these descriptions were accurate, and stated that he was genuinely sorry for his actions.

Three years earlier, as junior Transport Minister in November 2002, he had spearheaded the Government's anti-drink driving campaign, warning that "some drivers still choose to ignore our drink driving laws, and as a result innocent lives are destroyed".

He lives with his second wife, Siobhán and the couple's son.

Political offices
Preceded by Enda Kenny as Minister for Tourism and Trade	Minister for Tourism, Sport and Recreation; 1997–2002	Succeeded by John O'Donoghue as Minister for Arts, Sport and Tourism
Preceded by Joe Jacob as Minister of State at the Department of Public Enterprise	Minister of State at the Department of Transport; 2002–2004	Succeeded by Ivor Callely

Dáil	Election	Deputy (Party)	Deputy (Party)	Deputy (Party)
17th	1961	Liam Cunningham (FF)	Neil Blaney (IFF)	Paddy Harte (FG)
18th	1965	Liam Cunningham (FF)	Neil Blaney (IFF)	Paddy Harte (FG)
19th	1969	Liam Cunningham (FF)	Neil Blaney (IFF)	Paddy Harte (FG)
20th	1973	Liam Cunningham (FF)	Neil Blaney (IFF)	Paddy Harte (FG)
20th	1976 by-election	Paddy Keaveney (IFF)	Neil Blaney (IFF)	Paddy Harte (FG)
21st	1977	Constituency abolished. See Donegal		
22nd	1981	Hugh Conaghan (FF)	Neil Blaney (IFF)	Paddy Harte (FG)
23rd	1982 (Feb)	Hugh Conaghan (FF)	Neil Blaney (IFF)	Paddy Harte (FG)
24th	1982 (Nov)	Hugh Conaghan (FF)	Neil Blaney (IFF)	Paddy Harte (FG)
25th	1987	Hugh Conaghan (FF)	Neil Blaney (IFF)	Paddy Harte (FG)
26th	1989	Jim McDaid (FF)	Neil Blaney (IFF)	Paddy Harte (FG)
27th	1992	Jim McDaid (FF)	Neil Blaney (IFF)	Paddy Harte (FG)
27th	1996 by-election	Jim McDaid (FF)	Cecilia Keaveney (FF)	Paddy Harte (FG)
28th	1997	Jim McDaid (FF)	Cecilia Keaveney (FF)	Harry Blaney (IFF)
29th	2002	Jim McDaid (FF)	Cecilia Keaveney (FF)	Niall Blaney (IFF)
30th	2007	Jim McDaid (FF)	Joe McHugh (FG)	Niall Blaney (FF)
31st	2011	Charlie McConalogue (FF)	Joe McHugh (FG)	Pádraig Mac Lochlainn (SF)
32nd	2016	Constituency abolished. See Donegal		
