= Joachim Loughrey =

Irish politician (born 1947)

Senator
- In office 13 May 1982 – 1 November 1989
- Constituency: Cultural and Educational Panel

Personal details
- Born: 1947 (age 78–79) County Donegal, Ireland
- Party: Fine Gael

Joachim Loughrey (born 1947) is a former Fine Gael politician from County Donegal in Ireland. He was a senator from 1982 to 1989.

A national school teacher before entering politics, Loughrey stood unsuccessfully as a Fine Gael candidate for Dáil Éireann in the Donegal North-East constituency on five occasions: at the by-election in 1976 and at the February 1982, November 1982, 1987 and 1989 general elections.

After his February 1982 defeat, he was elected to the 16th Seanad on the Cultural and Educational Panel. He was re-elected in the 1983 and 1987 Seanad elections, but lost his seat in the 1989 elections to the 19th Seanad, and was unsuccessful again at the 1993 Seanad elections.
