= Paddy Keaveney =

Irish politician and businessman (1929–1995)

Teachta Dála
- In office June 1976 – June 1977
- Constituency: Donegal North-East

Donegal County Councillor
- In office June 1979 – July 1995
- Constituency: Buncrana

Personal details
- Born: 28 October 1929 County Donegal, Ireland
- Died: 19 July 1995 (aged 65) County Donegal, Ireland
- Party: Independent Fianna Fáil
- Children: Cecilia

Patrick Keaveney (28 October 1929 – 19 July 1995) was an Irish politician and businessman from County Donegal. He was a cooperative manager and a member of the Independent Fianna Fáil party, and was a Teachta Dála (TD) for one year.

He was elected to the 20th Dáil as TD for Donegal North-East at a by-election in June 1976 caused by the death of Fianna Fáil TD Liam Cunningham. His surprise victory gave Independent Fianna Fáil two out of the three seats in Donegal North-East, but the constituency was abolished for the 1977 general election, when he was defeated in the new Donegal constituency. He did not stand again.

Keaveney was later elected to Donegal County Council, and after his death in 1995, his daughter Cecilia was co-opted to take his place as councillor. The following year, she was elected to Dáil Éireann as the Fianna Fáil candidate in a by-election following the death of Independent Fianna Fáil's founder Neil Blaney.

| Dáil | Election | Deputy (Party) | Deputy (Party) | Deputy (Party) |
|---|---|---|---|---|
| 17th | 1961 | Liam Cunningham (FF) | Neil Blaney (IFF) | Paddy Harte (FG) |
| 18th | 1965 | Liam Cunningham (FF) | Neil Blaney (IFF) | Paddy Harte (FG) |
| 19th | 1969 | Liam Cunningham (FF) | Neil Blaney (IFF) | Paddy Harte (FG) |
| 20th | 1973 | Liam Cunningham (FF) | Neil Blaney (IFF) | Paddy Harte (FG) |
| 20th | 1976 by-election | Paddy Keaveney (IFF) | Neil Blaney (IFF) | Paddy Harte (FG) |
| 21st | 1977 | Constituency abolished. See Donegal | | |
| 22nd | 1981 | Hugh Conaghan (FF) | Neil Blaney (IFF) | Paddy Harte (FG) |
| 23rd | 1982 (Feb) | Hugh Conaghan (FF) | Neil Blaney (IFF) | Paddy Harte (FG) |
| 24th | 1982 (Nov) | Hugh Conaghan (FF) | Neil Blaney (IFF) | Paddy Harte (FG) |
| 25th | 1987 | Hugh Conaghan (FF) | Neil Blaney (IFF) | Paddy Harte (FG) |
| 26th | 1989 | Jim McDaid (FF) | Neil Blaney (IFF) | Paddy Harte (FG) |
| 27th | 1992 | Jim McDaid (FF) | Neil Blaney (IFF) | Paddy Harte (FG) |
| 27th | 1996 by-election | Jim McDaid (FF) | Cecilia Keaveney (FF) | Paddy Harte (FG) |
| 28th | 1997 | Jim McDaid (FF) | Cecilia Keaveney (FF) | Harry Blaney (IFF) |
| 29th | 2002 | Jim McDaid (FF) | Cecilia Keaveney (FF) | Niall Blaney (IFF) |
| 30th | 2007 | Jim McDaid (FF) | Joe McHugh (FG) | Niall Blaney (FF) |
| 31st | 2011 | Charlie McConalogue (FF) | Joe McHugh (FG) | Pádraig Mac Lochlainn (SF) |
| 32nd | 2016 | Constituency abolished. See Donegal | | |
