= Donegal North-East =

Former Dáil Éireann constituency (1981–2016)

- Former Dáil constituency
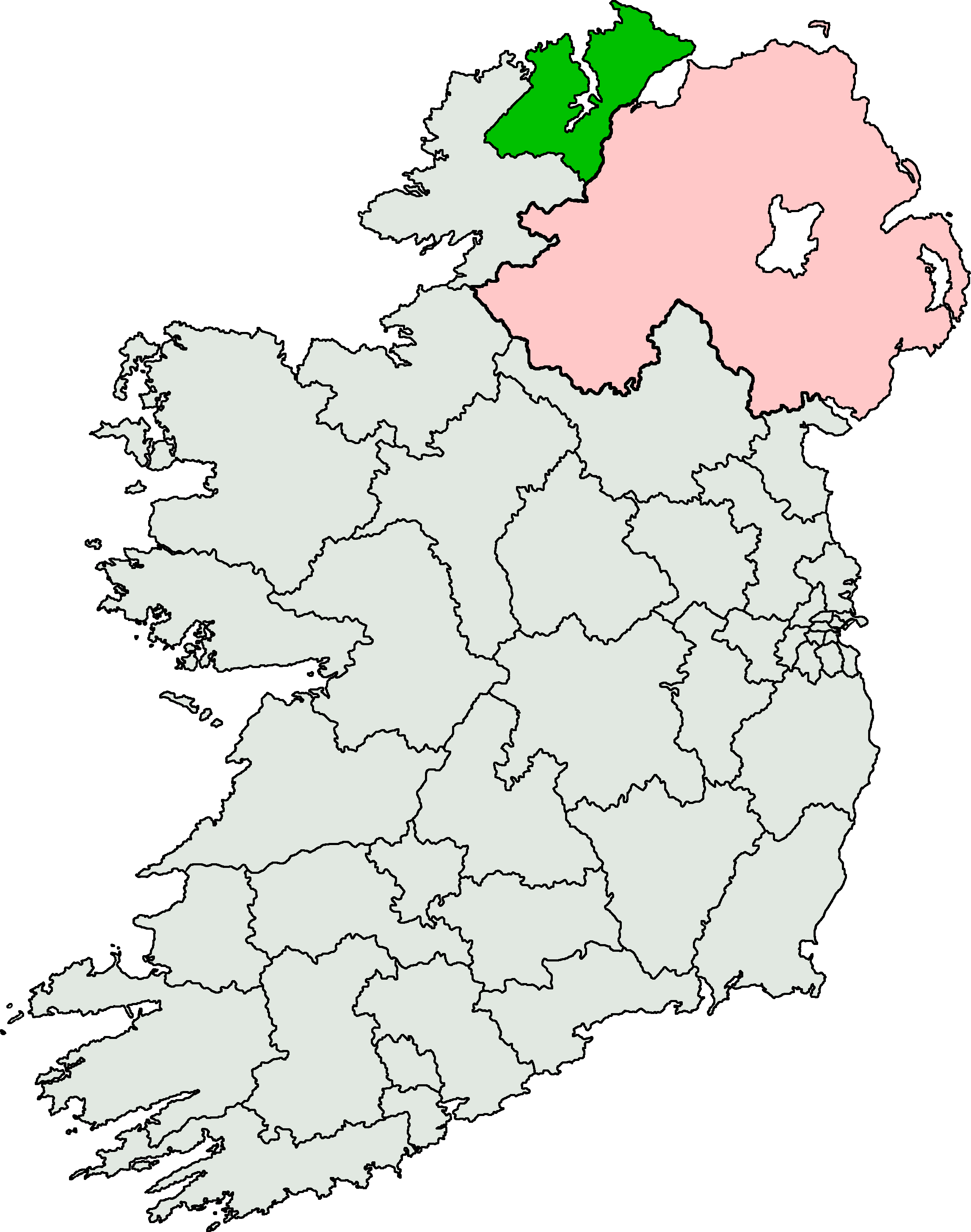
- Location of Donegal North-East within Ireland

Former constituency
- Created: 1981
- Abolished: 2016
- Seats: 3
- Local government area: County Donegal
- Replaced by: Donegal

Donegal North-East
- Former Dáil constituency

Former constituency
- Created: 1961
- Abolished: 1977
- Seats: 3
- Local government area: County Donegal
- Replaced by: Donegal

Donegal North-East was a parliamentary constituency represented in Dáil Éireann, the lower house of the Irish parliament or Oireachtas, from 1961 to 1977 and from 1981 to 2016. The constituency elected 3 deputies (Teachtaí Dála, commonly known as TDs). The method of election was proportional representation by means of the single transferable vote (PR-STV).

== History ==
The constituency was first created for the 1961 general election, taking in parts of the abolished Donegal East constituency. It lasted until 1977, when it was abolished and became part of a new Donegal constituency, and was then recreated for the 1981 general election. It was abolished at the 2016 general election, and again became part of the re-created Donegal constituency.

== Boundaries ==
The constituency was located in the northern part of County Donegal. It encompassed the Letterkenny, Milford and Inishowen electoral areas of Donegal County Council.

The Electoral (Amendment) Act 2009 defined the constituency as:

"In the county of Donegal the electoral divisions of:

Ardmalin, Ballyliffin, Birdstown, Buncrana Rural, Burt, Carndonagh, Carthage, Castlecary, Castleforward, Culdaff, Desertegny, Dunaff, Fahan, Glenagannon, Gleneely, Glentogher, Greencastle, Illies, Inch Island, Kilderry, Killea, Malin, Mintiaghs, Moville, Newtown Cunningham, Redcastle, Straid, Three Trees, Turmone, Whitecastle, in the former Rural District of Inishowen;

Ballymacool, Castlewray, Corravaddy, Edenacarnan, Gartán, Gortnavern, Killymasny, Kincraigy, Letterkenny Rural, Magheraboy, Manorcunningham, Mín an Lábáin, Suí Corr, Templedouglas, in the former Rural District of Letterkenny;

An Cheathrú Chaol, An Tearmann, Ballyarr, Carraig Airt, Cnoc Colbha, Creamhghort, Fánaid Thiar, Fánaid Thuaidh, Glen, Glenalla, Grianfort, Killygarvan, Kilmacrenan, Loch Caol, Millford, Rathmelton, Rathmullan, Ros Goill, Rosnakill, in the former Rural District of Millford;

and the towns of Buncrana and Letterkenny.

== TDs ==
Teachtaí Dála (TDs) for Donegal North-East 1961–2016
Key to parties: FF = Fianna Fáil; FG = Fine Gael; IFF = Independent Fianna Fáil; SF = Sinn Féin
Dáil	Election	Deputy (Party)	Deputy (Party)	Deputy (Party)
17th	1961	Liam Cunningham (FF)	Neil Blaney (IFF)	Paddy Harte (FG)
18th	1965	Liam Cunningham (FF)	Neil Blaney (IFF)	Paddy Harte (FG)
19th	1969	Liam Cunningham (FF)	Neil Blaney (IFF)	Paddy Harte (FG)
20th	1973	Liam Cunningham (FF)	Neil Blaney (IFF)	Paddy Harte (FG)
20th	1976 by-election	Paddy Keaveney (IFF)	Neil Blaney (IFF)	Paddy Harte (FG)
21st	1977	Constituency abolished. See Donegal		
22nd	1981	Hugh Conaghan (FF)	Neil Blaney (IFF)	Paddy Harte (FG)
23rd	1982 (Feb)	Hugh Conaghan (FF)	Neil Blaney (IFF)	Paddy Harte (FG)
24th	1982 (Nov)	Hugh Conaghan (FF)	Neil Blaney (IFF)	Paddy Harte (FG)
25th	1987	Hugh Conaghan (FF)	Neil Blaney (IFF)	Paddy Harte (FG)
26th	1989	Jim McDaid (FF)	Neil Blaney (IFF)	Paddy Harte (FG)
27th	1992	Jim McDaid (FF)	Neil Blaney (IFF)	Paddy Harte (FG)
27th	1996 by-election	Jim McDaid (FF)	Cecilia Keaveney (FF)	Paddy Harte (FG)
28th	1997	Jim McDaid (FF)	Cecilia Keaveney (FF)	Harry Blaney (IFF)
29th	2002	Jim McDaid (FF)	Cecilia Keaveney (FF)	Niall Blaney (IFF)
30th	2007	Jim McDaid (FF)	Joe McHugh (FG)	Niall Blaney (FF)
31st	2011	Charlie McConalogue (FF)	Joe McHugh (FG)	Pádraig Mac Lochlainn (SF)
32nd	2016	Constituency abolished. See Donegal		

Note: The columns in this table are used only for presentational purposes, and no significance should be attached to the order of columns. For details of the order in which seats were won at each election, see the detailed results of that election.

== Elections ==
*: Outgoing TD

=== 2011 general election ===
2011 general election: Donegal North-East
Party	Candidate	FPv%	Count								
Party	Candidate	FPv%	1	2	3	4	5	6	7	8	9
Sinn Féin	Pádraig Mac Lochlainn	24.5	9,278	9,350	9,585						
Fine Gael	Joe McHugh	19.3	7,330	7,368	7,513	7,524	7,662	8,147	8,731	12,049	
Fianna Fáil	Charlie McConalogue	17.4	6,613	6,661	6,795	6,816	7,064	7,255	7,511	8,245	8,976
Fine Gael	John Ryan	12.3	4,657	4,710	4,871	4,884	4,950	4,976	5,081		
Labour	Jimmy Harte	10.8	4,090	4,162	4,301	4,319	4,535	4,801	5,646	6,131	7,219
Independent	Dessie Shiels	4.9	1,876	1,903	2,063	2,085	2,299	2,605			
Independent	Ian McGarvey	3.4	1,287	1,296	1,399	1,409	1,653				
New Vision	MacDara Blaney (Note: New Vision was an electoral alliance of independent non-party candidates and did not appear on the ballot.)	3.2	1,228	1,249	1,317	1,327					
Independent	Betty Holmes	3.0	1,150	1,197							
Green	Humphrey Murphy	0.5	206								
New Vision	Ryan Stewart	0.5	203								
Electorate: 59,084 Valid: 37,918 Spoilt: 406 (1.1%) Quota: 9,480 Turnout: 38,324 (64.9%)

=== 2007 general election ===
2007 general election: Donegal North-East
Party	Candidate	FPv%	Count							
Party	Candidate	FPv%	1	2	3	4	5	6	7	8
Fine Gael	Joe McHugh	22.6	8,711	8,800	8,900	9,134	10,034			
Sinn Féin	Pádraig Mac Lochlainn	17.5	6,733	6,789	6,896	6,997	7,315	7,410	8,821	8,876
Fianna Fáil	Jim McDaid	17.5	6,724	6,746	6,786	6,932	7,343	7,489	10,008	
Fianna Fáil	Cecilia Keaveney	16.5	6,362	6,441	6,471	6,481	6,674	6,744		
Fianna Fáil	Niall Blaney	16.3	6,288	6,332	6,360	6,538	6,802	6,888	9,123	9,439
Independent	Jimmy Harte	3.4	1,313	1,353	1,415	1,469				
Independent	Ian McGarvey	2.0	733	795	823					
Labour	Siobhan McLaughlin	1.8	703	723	844	884				
Green	Frank Gallagher	1.4	520	546						
Christian Solidarity	Mary Doherty	0.9	339							
Independent	Arthur McGuinness	0.1	86							
Electorate: 57,244 Valid: 38,545 Spoilt: 386 (1.0%) Quota: 9,637 Turnout: 38,931 (68.0%)

Jim McDaid resigned as a TD on 2 November 2010. A Fine Gael motion on 4 November 2010 to issue the writ of election to fill the vacancy was defeated by 72 votes to 76, opposed by the Fianna Fáil–Green Party government. The seat remained vacant until the dissolution of the 30th Dáil on 1 February 2011.

=== 2002 general election ===
2002 general election: Donegal North-East
Party	Candidate	FPv%	Count					
Party	Candidate	FPv%	1	2	3	4	5	6
Fianna Fáil	Jim McDaid	26.5	9,614					
Fianna Fáil	Cecilia Keaveney	22.9	8,340	8,463	8,712	9,724		
Independent Fianna Fáil	Niall Blaney (Note: Blaney was a member of Independent Fianna Fáil, an unregistered political party, and appeared on the ballot as a non-party independent.)	16.8	6,124	6,261	6,392	7,667	8,031	8,789
Fine Gael	Bernard McGuinness	10.8	3,914	4,101	4,111	4,376	4,551	
Fine Gael	Seán Maloney	10.3	3,694	4,081	4,181	4,627	4,680	7,432
Sinn Féin	Pádraig Mac Lochlainn	9.9	3,611	3,714	3,751			
Labour	Jackie McNair	2.8	1,021					
Electorate: 58,208 Valid: 36,347 Spoilt: 549 (1.5%) Quota: 9,087 Turnout: 36,896 (63.4%)

=== 1997 general election ===
1997 general election: Donegal North-East
Party	Candidate	FPv%	Count				
Party	Candidate	FPv%	1	2	3	4	5
Fianna Fáil	Cecilia Keaveney	23.4	8,317	8,450	8,860	9,712	
Independent Fianna Fáil	Harry Blaney (Note: Blaney was a member of Independent Fianna Fáil, an unregistered political party, and appeared on the ballot as a non-party independent.)	21.1	7,484	7,608	7,723	9,387	
Fianna Fáil	Jim McDaid	18.4	6,538	6,710	6,788	7,894	8,244
Fine Gael	Paddy Harte	14.0	4,969	5,860	6,798	7,627	7,729
Sinn Féin	Pat Doherty	8.1	2,881	2,917	2,975		
Labour	Seán Maloney	5.5	1,948	2,038	2,178		
Fine Gael	Jim Sheridan	4.9	1,735	1,793			
Donegal Progressive Party	Jim Devenney (Note: Devenney was a member of the Donegal Progressive Party, which was registered to contest local elections only, and appeared on the ballot as a non-party independent.)	4.7	1,657				
Electorate: 52,576 Valid: 35,529 Spoilt: 422 (1.2%) Quota: 8,883 Turnout: 35,951 (68.4%)

=== 1996 by-election ===
Independent Fianna Fáil TD Neil Blaney died on 8 November 1995. A by-election was held to fill the vacancy on 2 April 1996.

1996 by-election: Donegal North-East
Party	Candidate	FPv%	Count			
Party	Candidate	FPv%	1	2	3	4
Fianna Fáil	Cecilia Keaveney	32.2	9,872	10,351	11,454	14,115
Independent Fianna Fáil	Harry Blaney (Note: Blaney was a member of Independent Fianna Fáil, an unregistered political party, and appeared on the ballot as a non-party independent.)	29.2	8,943	10,208	11,444	13,077
Fine Gael	Jim Sheridan	18.5	5,679	5,813	6,861	
Labour	Seán Maloney	12.4	3,791	4,003		
Sinn Féin	Pat Doherty	7.6	2,340			
Electorate: 50,443 Valid: 30,625 Quota: 15,313 Turnout: 60.7%

=== 1992 general election ===
1992 general election: Donegal North-East
Party	Candidate	FPv%	Count							
Party	Candidate	FPv%	1	2	3	4	5	6	7	8
Fianna Fáil	Jim McDaid	22.2	6,927	6,952	7,036	7,119	7,347	7,531	8,834	
Independent Fianna Fáil	Neil Blaney (Note: Blaney was a member of Independent Fianna Fáil, an unregistered political party, and appeared on the ballot as a non-party independent.)	16.8	5,248	5,345	5,403	5,722	5,819	6,125	6,734	7,061
Fianna Fáil	Hugh Conaghan	14.5	4,538	4,638	4,679	4,770	4,883	5,137	5,477	5,722
Fine Gael	Paddy Harte	13.8	4,292	4,330	4,387	4,424	5,487	7,036	8,055	
Labour	Seán Maloney	11.3	3,538	3,590	3,794	3,888	4,093	4,379		
Fine Gael	Bernard McGuinness	8.6	2,667	2,707	2,790	2,817	2,907			
Donegal Progressive Party	Jim Devenney (Note: Devenney was a member of the Donegal Progressive Party, which was registered to contest local elections only, and appeared on the ballot as a non-party independent.)	6.7	2,082	2,096	2,121	2,135				
Sinn Féin	Jim Ferry	2.6	819	844	876					
Green	Brigid McGonagle	2.0	611	657						
Christian Centrist	Patrick Doherty	1.6	487							
Electorate: 46,978 Valid: 31,209 Spoilt: 560 (1.8%) Quota: 7,803 Turnout: 31,769 (67.6%)

=== 1989 general election ===
1989 general election: Donegal North-East
Party	Candidate	FPv%	Count				
Party	Candidate	FPv%	1	2	3	4	5
Fine Gael	Paddy Harte	27.0	7,506				
Independent Fianna Fáil	Neil Blaney (Note: Blaney was a member of Independent Fianna Fáil, an unregistered political party, and appeared on the ballot as a non-party independent.)	25.1	6,961				
Fianna Fáil	Jim McDaid	20.0	5,553	5,623	5,717	5,951	6,254
Fianna Fáil	Hugh Conaghan	19.3	5,363	5,399	5,447	5,576	5,730
Sinn Féin	Patrick Doherty	3.9	1,091	1,102	1,164		
Fine Gael	Joachim Loughrey	3.2	891	1,320	1,405	1,474	
Independent	Anne Wilkinson	1.5	428	440			
Electorate: 44,450 Valid: 27,793 Quota: 6,949 Turnout: 62.5%

=== 1987 general election ===
1987 general election: Donegal North-East
Party	Candidate	FPv%	Count			
Party	Candidate	FPv%	1	2	3	4
Independent Fianna Fáil	Neil Blaney (Note: Blaney was a member of Independent Fianna Fáil, an unregistered political party, and appeared on the ballot as a non-party independent.)	26.2	7,720			
Fianna Fáil	Hugh Conaghan	24.9	7,324	7,455		
Fine Gael	Paddy Harte	23.8	6,997	7,041	7,481	
Sinn Féin	Eddie Fullerton	8.0	2,365	2,438	2,536	2,663
Fianna Fáil	Ronan Sweeney	7.4	2,188	2,269	2,390	2,471
Fine Gael	Joachim Loughrey	5.9	1,737	1,757	1,870	
Ind. Unionist	Michael Brooks	2.4	696	705		
Labour	Kevin Monaghan	1.3	393	399		
Electorate: 44,853 Valid: 29,420 Quota: 7,356 Turnout: 65.6%

=== November 1982 general election ===
November 1982 general election: Donegal North-East
Party	Candidate	FPv%	Count				
Party	Candidate	FPv%	1	2	3	4	5
Fine Gael	Paddy Harte	31.4	9,486				
Independent Fianna Fáil	Neil Blaney (Note: Blaney was a member of Independent Fianna Fáil, an unregistered political party, and appeared on the ballot as a non-party independent.)	26.5	7,997				
Fianna Fáil	Hugh Conaghan	21.8	6,599	6,698	6,795	7,033	7,529
Fianna Fáil	Bernard McGlinchey	12.9	3,889	3,975	4,056	4,219	4,615
Fine Gael	Joachim Loughrey	5.6	1,697	3,389	3,654	3,692	
Labour	Anne Wilkinson	1.9	562	613			
Electorate: 41,462 Valid: 30,230 Quota: 7,558 Turnout: 72.9%

=== February 1982 general election ===
Unusually, all seats were filled on the first count. A further two counts were then held to give lower-placed candidates a chance to save their deposits.

February 1982 general election: Donegal North-East
Party	Candidate	FPv%	Count		
Party	Candidate	FPv%	1	2	3
Fine Gael	Paddy Harte	31.3	9,362		
Fianna Fáil	Hugh Conaghan	27.1	8,116		
Independent Fianna Fáil	Neil Blaney (Note: Blaney was a member of Independent Fianna Fáil, an unregistered political party, and appeared on the ballot as a non-party independent.)	26.3	7,864		
Fine Gael	Joachim Loughrey	7.1	2,112	3,823	
Fianna Fáil	Ian McGarvey	6.6	1,959	2,046	2,670
Labour	Anne Wilkinson	1.6	493	580	595
Electorate: 40,811 Valid: 29,906 Spoilt: 410 (1.4%) Quota: 7,477 Turnout: 30,316 (74.3%)

=== 1981 general election ===
1981 general election: Donegal North-East
Party	Candidate	FPv%	Count			
Party	Candidate	FPv%	1	2	3	4
Independent Fianna Fáil	Neil Blaney (Note: Blaney was a member of Independent Fianna Fáil, an unregistered political party, and appeared on the ballot as a non-party independent.)	24.5	7,920	7,999	8,228	
Fine Gael	Paddy Harte	24.3	7,853	7,967	10,995	
Fianna Fáil	Hugh Conaghan	22.6	7,283	7,319	7,536	7,814
Fianna Fáil	Bernard McGlinchey	15.8	5,111	5,191	5,324	5,500
Fine Gael	Bernard McGuinness	11.3	3,650	3,753		
Labour	Anne Wilkinson	1.5	470			
Electorate: 40,807 Valid: 32,287 Spoilt: 405 (1.2%) Quota: 8,072 Turnout: 32,992 (80.8%)

=== 1976 by-election ===
Fianna Fáil TD Liam Cunningham died on 29 February 1976. A by-election was held to fill the vacancy on 10 June 1976.

1976 by-election: Donegal North-East
Party	Candidate	FPv%	Count		
Party	Candidate	FPv%	1	2	3
Fine Gael	Joachim Loughrey	31.8	10,188	10,777	11,957
Independent Fianna Fáil	Paddy Keaveney (Note: Keaveney was a member of Independent Fianna Fáil, an unregistered political party, and appeared on the ballot as a non-party independent.)	31.1	9,986	10,525	13,579
Fianna Fáil	Hugh Conaghan	30.7	9,865	10,323	
Independent	Tony Gill	6.4	2,053		
Electorate: 42,390 Valid: 32,092 Quota: 16,047 Turnout: 75.7%

=== 1973 general election ===
1973 general election: Donegal North-East
Party	Candidate	FPv%	Count			
Party	Candidate	FPv%	1	2	3	4
Independent Fianna Fáil	Neil Blaney (Note: Blaney was a member of Independent Fianna Fáil, an unregistered political party, and appeared on the ballot as a non-party independent.)	29.3	8,368			
Fianna Fáil	Liam Cunningham	23.5	6,704	7,052	7,538	
Fine Gael	Paddy Harte	19.2	5,480	5,795	5,998	6,543
Fine Gael	Bertie Boggs	14.2	4,056	4,174	4,289	4,445
Fianna Fáil	Bernard McGlinchey	8.9	2,537	2,659	3,245	
Fianna Fáil	John Harkin	4.2	1,191	1,356		
Independent	Daniel MacCarron	0.7	205	369		
Electorate: 37,924 Valid: 28,541 Quota: 7,136 Turnout: 75.3%

=== 1969 general election ===
1969 general election: Donegal North-East
Party	Candidate	FPv%	Count			
Party	Candidate	FPv%	1	2	3	4
Fianna Fáil	Neil Blaney	30.4	8,706			
Fianna Fáil	Liam Cunningham	24.1	6,903	8,325		
Fine Gael	Paddy Harte	21.1	6,057	6,104	6,545	6,576
Fine Gael	Bertie Boggs	20.8	5,962	6,012	6,172	6,180
Labour	Colum O'Donnell	3.6	1,037	1,057		
Electorate: 37,371 Valid: 28,665 Quota: 7,167 Turnout: 76.7%

=== 1965 general election ===
1965 general election: Donegal North-East
Party	Candidate	FPv%	Count		
Party	Candidate	FPv%	1	2	3
Fianna Fáil	Neil Blaney	35.5	9,003		
Fianna Fáil	Liam Cunningham	23.8	6,039	8,501	
Fine Gael	Paddy Harte	23.7	6,016	6,142	6,328
Fine Gael	Seán McLaughlin	12.5	3,170	3,185	3,279
Labour	Dominick McCauley	4.5	1,147	1,203	1,374
Electorate: 35,152 Valid: 25,375 Quota: 6,344 Turnout: 72.2%

=== 1961 general election ===
1961 general election: Donegal North-East
Party	Candidate	FPv%	Count		
Party	Candidate	FPv%	1	2	3
Fianna Fáil	Neil Blaney	37.2	8,738		
Fianna Fáil	Liam Cunningham	24.2	5,686	8,349	
Fine Gael	Paddy Harte	23.1	5,427	5,568	5,888
Fine Gael	Seán McLaughlin	15.5	3,650	3,708	3,789
Electorate: 34,844 Valid: 23,501 Quota: 5,876 Turnout: 67.5%

== See also ==
- Dáil constituencies
- Politics of the Republic of Ireland
- Historic Dáil constituencies
- Elections in the Republic of Ireland
