= 1976 Donegal North-East by-election =

By-election to the 20th Dáil

- 10 June 1976
- Turnout: 32,092 (75.7%)
	Keaveney	Loughrey	Conaghan
Nominee	Paddy Keaveney (Note: Keaveney was a member of Independent Fianna Fáil, an unregistered political party, and appeared on the ballot as a non-party independent.)	Joachim Loughrey	Hugh Conaghan
Party	Ind. Fianna Fáil	Fine Gael	Fianna Fáil
First preferences	9,986	10,188	9,865
Percentage	31.1%	31.8%	30.7%
Final count	13,579	11,957	–
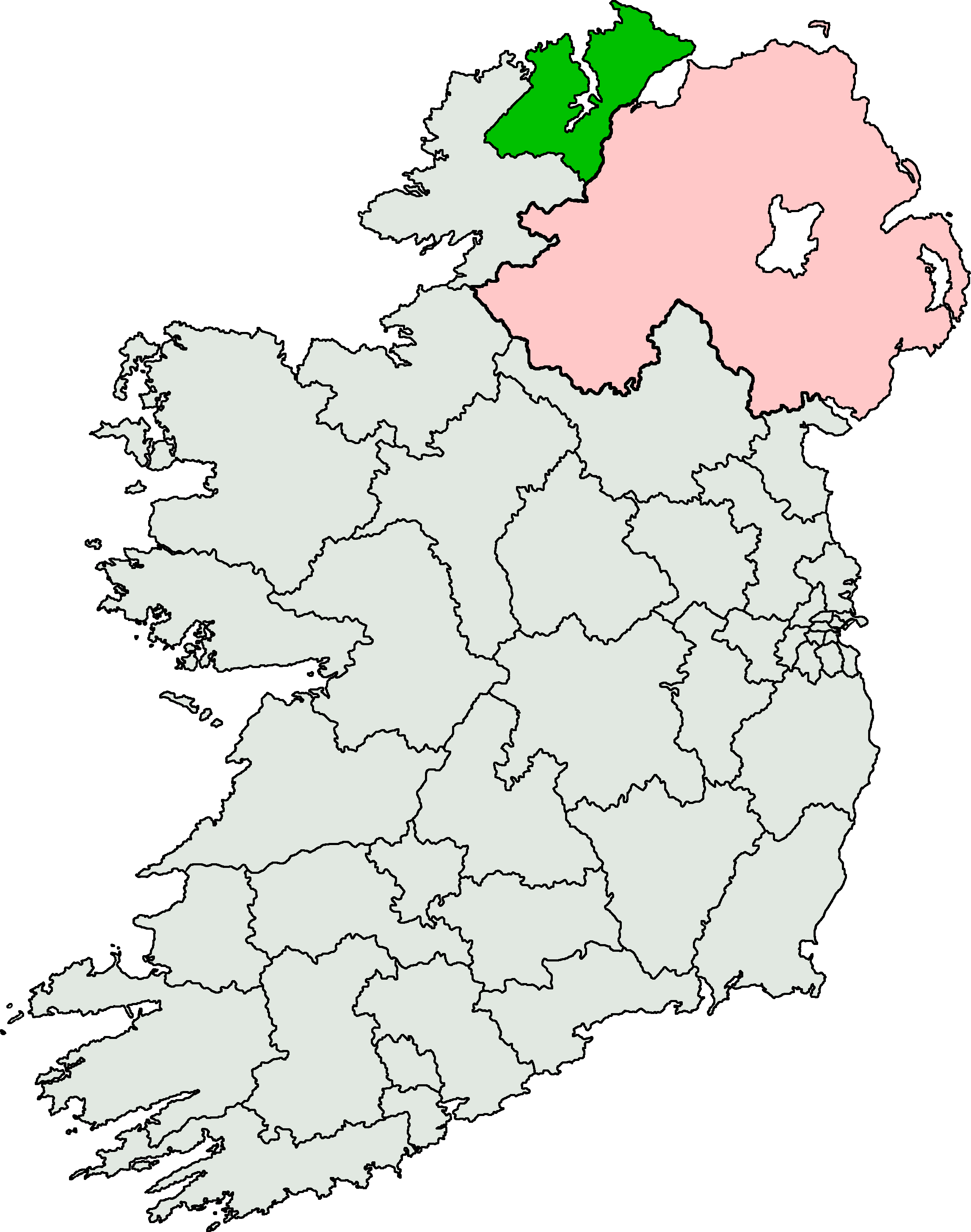
- Donegal North-East shown within Ireland
TD before election
Liam Cunningham
Fianna Fáil
TD after election
Paddy Keaveney
Independent Fianna Fáil

A Dáil by-election was held in the constituency of Donegal North-East in Ireland on Thursday, 10 June 1976, to fill a vacancy in the 20th Dáil. It followed the death of Fianna Fáil Teachta Dála (TD) Liam Cunningham on 29 February 1976.

The writ of election was moved by Fianna Fáil TD Patrick Lalor on 20 May 1976 and was agreed by the Dáil.

The by-election was won by the Independent Fianna Fáil candidate Paddy Keaveney.

It was held on the same day as the 1976 Dublin South-West by-election. Keaveney was not subsequently re-elected to the Dáil.

At the 1977 general election, Keaveney stood in the new Donegal constituency but was not elected, and was never subsequently re-elected to the Dáil.

== Result ==
1976 Donegal North-East by-election
Party	Candidate	FPv%	Count		
Party	Candidate	FPv%	1	2	3
Fine Gael	Joachim Loughrey	31.8	10,188	10,777	11,957
Independent Fianna Fáil	Paddy Keaveney	31.1	9,986	10,525	13,579
Fianna Fáil	Hugh Conaghan	30.7	9,865	10,323	
Independent	Tony Gill	6.4	2,053		
Electorate: 42,390 Valid: 32,092 Quota: 16,047 Turnout: 75.7%
