= Liam Cunningham (politician) =

Irish politician (1915–1976)

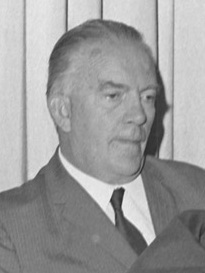
- Cunningham in 1970

Parliamentary Secretary
- 1970–1973: Local Government

Teachta Dála
- In office October 1961 – 29 February 1976
- Constituency: Donegal North-East
- In office May 1951 – October 1961
- Constituency: Donegal East

Personal details
- Born: 25 January 1915 County Donegal, Ireland
- Died: 29 February 1976 (aged 61) County Donegal, Ireland
- Party: Fianna Fáil

Liam Cunningham (25 January 1915 – 29 February 1976) was an Irish Fianna Fáil politician. He was born in County Donegal in 1915. A qualified national school teacher, Cunningham was first elected to Dáil Éireann as a Fianna Fáil Teachta Dála (TD) for the Donegal East constituency at the 1951 general election. At the time the senior Fianna Fáil TD was Neil Blaney who became a government minister in 1957. From 1961 onwards, after constituency boundary changes, Cunningham and Blaney were elected for Donegal North-East.

After the events of the Arms Crisis Blaney was sacked as Minister for Agriculture by the Taoiseach Jack Lynch. In the resulting reshuffle, Cunningham was appointed Parliamentary Secretary to the Minister for Local Government on 9 May 1970. This was something of a surprise at the time and was attributed to an attempt by the party leadership to pressurise Blaney within the Donegal North-East constituency. Cunningham remained a Parliamentary Secretary until Fianna Fáil lost office after the 1973 general election.

When Blaney launched Independent Fianna Fáil, most of the Fianna Fáil public representatives in the area joined the new organisation. Cunningham remained with Fianna Fáil and was comfortably re-elected at the 1973 general election. He remained a TD until his death on 29 February 1976. The resulting by-election was won by Paddy Keaveney of Independent Fianna Fáil.

== Sources ==
- Rafter, Kevin (1993). Neil Blaney: A Soldier of Destiny.

Political offices
Preceded by Paudge Brennan	Parliamentary Secretary to the Minister for Local Government; 1970–1973	Succeeded by Michael Begley

Dáil	Election	Deputy (Party)	Deputy (Party)	Deputy (Party)	Deputy (Party)
9th	1937	John Friel (FF)	Neal Blaney (FF)	James Myles (Ind.)	Daniel McMenamin (FG)
10th	1938	John Friel (FF)	Henry McDevitt (FF)	James Myles (Ind.)	Daniel McMenamin (FG)
11th	1943	John Friel (FF)	Neal Blaney (FF)	William Sheldon (CnaT)	Daniel McMenamin (FG)
12th	1944	John Friel (FF)	Neal Blaney (FF)	William Sheldon (Ind.)	Daniel McMenamin (FG)
13th	1948	John Friel (FF)	Neal Blaney (FF)	William Sheldon (Ind.)	Daniel McMenamin (FG)
13th	1948 by-election	John Friel (FF)	Neil Blaney (FF)	William Sheldon (Ind.)	Daniel McMenamin (FG)
14th	1951	Liam Cunningham (FF)	Neil Blaney (FF)	William Sheldon (Ind.)	Daniel McMenamin (FG)
15th	1954	Liam Cunningham (FF)	Neil Blaney (FF)	William Sheldon (Ind.)	Daniel McMenamin (FG)
16th	1957	Liam Cunningham (FF)	Neil Blaney (FF)	William Sheldon (Ind.)	Daniel McMenamin (FG)
17th	1961	Constituency abolished. See Donegal North-East and Donegal South-West			

Dáil	Election	Deputy (Party)	Deputy (Party)	Deputy (Party)
17th	1961	Liam Cunningham (FF)	Neil Blaney (IFF)	Paddy Harte (FG)
18th	1965	Liam Cunningham (FF)	Neil Blaney (IFF)	Paddy Harte (FG)
19th	1969	Liam Cunningham (FF)	Neil Blaney (IFF)	Paddy Harte (FG)
20th	1973	Liam Cunningham (FF)	Neil Blaney (IFF)	Paddy Harte (FG)
20th	1976 by-election	Paddy Keaveney (IFF)	Neil Blaney (IFF)	Paddy Harte (FG)
21st	1977	Constituency abolished. See Donegal		
22nd	1981	Hugh Conaghan (FF)	Neil Blaney (IFF)	Paddy Harte (FG)
23rd	1982 (Feb)	Hugh Conaghan (FF)	Neil Blaney (IFF)	Paddy Harte (FG)
24th	1982 (Nov)	Hugh Conaghan (FF)	Neil Blaney (IFF)	Paddy Harte (FG)
25th	1987	Hugh Conaghan (FF)	Neil Blaney (IFF)	Paddy Harte (FG)
26th	1989	Jim McDaid (FF)	Neil Blaney (IFF)	Paddy Harte (FG)
27th	1992	Jim McDaid (FF)	Neil Blaney (IFF)	Paddy Harte (FG)
27th	1996 by-election	Jim McDaid (FF)	Cecilia Keaveney (FF)	Paddy Harte (FG)
28th	1997	Jim McDaid (FF)	Cecilia Keaveney (FF)	Harry Blaney (IFF)
29th	2002	Jim McDaid (FF)	Cecilia Keaveney (FF)	Niall Blaney (IFF)
30th	2007	Jim McDaid (FF)	Joe McHugh (FG)	Niall Blaney (FF)
31st	2011	Charlie McConalogue (FF)	Joe McHugh (FG)	Pádraig Mac Lochlainn (SF)
32nd	2016	Constituency abolished. See Donegal		
