= Niall Blaney =

Irish politician (born 1974)

Senator Niall Blaney
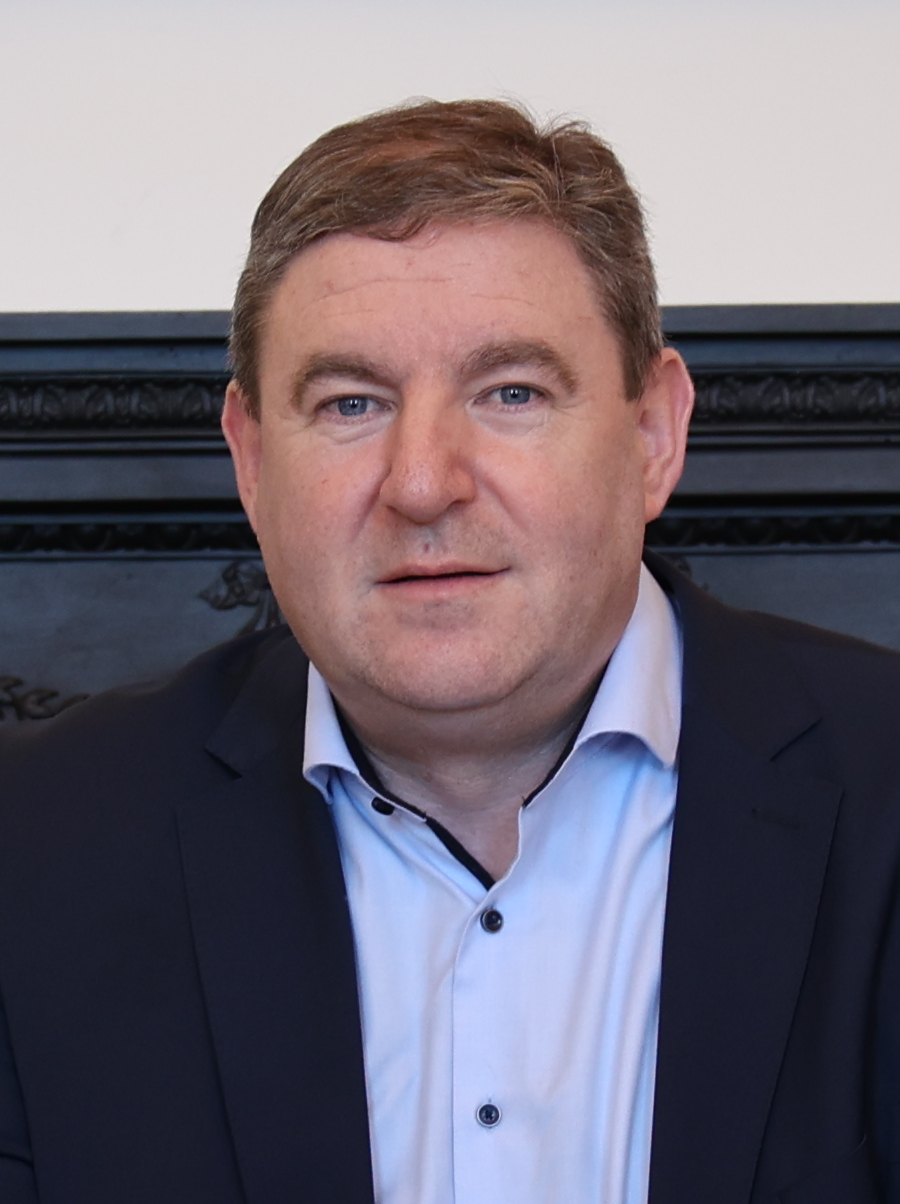
- Blaney in 2025

Senator
- Incumbent
- Assumed office 29 June 2020
- Constituency: Agricultural Panel

Teachta Dála
- In office May 2002 – February 2011
- Constituency: Donegal North-East

Personal details
- Born: 29 January 1974 (age 52) County Donegal, Ireland
- Party: Fianna Fáil (since 2006)
- Other political affiliations: Independent Fianna Fáil (until 2006)
- Spouse: Rosaleen Shovelin (m. 2002, separated)
- Children: 3
- Parent: Harry Blaney (father)
- Relatives: Neal Blaney (grandfather); Neil Blaney (uncle)
- Education: Letterkenny Institute of Technology

Niall Blaney (born 29 January 1974) is an Irish politician who has been a senator for the Agricultural Panel since April 2020.

Niall Blaney is the son of Harry Blaney, grandson of Neal Blaney, and nephew of Neil Blaney, all former TDs. A member of Independent Fianna Fáil until he joined Fianna Fáil in 2006, he served on Donegal County Council from 1999 to 2002 and then as a Teachta Dála (TD) for the Donegal North-East constituency from 2002 to 2011. He chose not to contest the 2011 general election and unsuccessfully contested the 2016 Seanad election before securing a Seanad seat in 2020. He ran as one of three Fianna Fáil candidates in the Midlands–North-West constituency for the 2024 European Parliament elections, but failed to win a seat.

== Early life and family ==
Niall Blaney comes from a political family. His grandfather Neal Blaney, his uncle Neil Blaney, and his father Harry Blaney all preceded him as TDs.

Born in Letterkenny, County Donegal in 1974, he graduated from Letterkenny Institute of Technology with a diploma in civil engineering. He married Rosaleen Shovelin in August 2002 after a five-year relationship and the couple had three children together. In January 2011, at a political meeting at the Silver Tassie Hotel in Letterkenny, Blaney disclosed that he and his wife had agreed to separate amicably. He revealed that he had moved out of the family home in Rosnakill, Fanad.

== Local and national politics ==
Blaney first held public office when he was elected to Donegal County Council in 1999. Three years later, in the 2002 general election, he won election to Dáil Éireann, capturing the third seat in the Donegal North-East constituency after Fianna Fáil's Jim McDaid and Cecilia Keaveney.

Blaney started his political career as a member of Independent Fianna Fáil, a splinter group created by his uncle Neil T. Blaney when he was expelled from Fianna Fáil over the Arms Crisis of 1969–1970. As a supporter of the Fianna Fáil–led coalition government upon his election to the Dáil, Blaney was widely anticipated to join Fianna Fáil and stand as a candidate for that party at the 2007 general election. Although some members of the Blaney family opposed the move, Niall Blaney announced in July 2006 that he had joined the Fianna Fáil party, a move that marked the effective end of Independent Fianna Fáil.

At the 2007 general election, Blaney again won the third seat in the constituency, after Fine Gael's Joe McHugh and Fianna Fáil's Jim McDaid. He was elected on the eighth count after a closely fought struggle with Sinn Féin councillor Pádraig Mac Lochlainn.

== Dáil retirement and Seanad campaigns ==
In a surprise statement on 30 January 2011, just hours before a Fianna Fáil selection convention for his constituency, Blaney announced that he would not be contesting the 2011 general election. He cited "personal reasons" for his decision. It was the first time in 84 years that a member of the Blaney family had not contested a general election.

Blaney was an unsuccessful candidate for the Industrial and Commercial Panel of Seanad Éireann in the 2016 election. He was also an unsuccessful candidate on 27 April 2018 in two simultaneous Seanad by-elections, one on each subpanel of the Agricultural Panel.

== Senator ==
With the support of game shoot bodies regulator the National Association of Regional Game Councils (NARGC), Blaney was a candidate for the Agricultural Panel in the March 2020 Seanad election. The move set him up against incumbent Senator Brian Ó Domhnaill (also with a history in Fianna Fáil). With only eleven seats available, Ó Domhnaill expressed surprise at Blaney's campaign, particularly as it was on a different panel than the one to which he sought admission in 2016. In March 2020, Blaney was elected to the Seanad, while Ó Domhnaill lost his seat.

Following his involvement in the Oireachtas Golf Society scandal in August 2020, Blaney was one of six senators who lost the party whip as punishment for their actions. He is the Fianna Fáil Seanad spokesperson on Northern Ireland.

=== 2024 European Parliament campaign ===
At the 5 February 2024 selection convention in Mullingar, Blaney was one of three candidates—along with Laois–Offaly TD Barry Cowen and senator Lisa Chambers from Mayo—seeking the Fianna Fáil nomination for the 2024 European Parliament election in the Midlands–North-West constituency. With 2,267 Fianna Fáil members voting, Cowen received 894 votes on the first count while Blaney received 803 and Chambers 570. After Chambers was eliminated and her votes distributed, Cowen defeated Blaney by 70 votes, 1,140 to 1,070. However, on 29 February, Fianna Fáil added both Blaney and Chambers to its election ticket for Midlands–North-West, in addition to Cowen. This was described as a "surprise move" by the party, which had not had an MEP in the constituency since Pat "the Cope" Gallagher lost his seat at the 2014 European Parliament election.

Hours before the launch of Fianna Fáil's European election manifesto on 24 May, Blaney issued a press release alleging that the party had gone into "panic mode" over its three-candidate strategy and claimed it was "intent on throwing two of them overboard and settling for one seat." At a press conference to launch the manifesto, Blaney publicly criticised Fianna Fáil leader Micheál Martin over an alleged lack of support for his campaign, claiming that he was receiving fewer media opportunities and less canvassing support than the party's other MEP candidates. Martin disputed that the party had given Blaney less support but said: "I'm not going to have a public discussion on the logistics of a campaign at a press conference." Blaney later said he had a "robust" private discussion with Martin following the press conference but continued to accuse the party of showing favouritism to Cowen and Chambers, claiming that Fianna Fáil was "giving up on Connaught and the border counties where we need representation most".

Blaney received 30,387 (4.5%) first-preference votes and did not win a seat. He stated that he had driven 135,000 km in his car while campaigning. Chambers also failed to win a seat, although Cowen was elected as an MEP.

Blaney was Director of elections for Fianna Fáil in Donegal for the 2024 general election. The party returned two Dáil seats, and retained Blaney his Seanad seat at the 2025 Seanad election.

== See also ==
- Families in the Oireachtas

Dáil	Election	Deputy (Party)	Deputy (Party)	Deputy (Party)
17th	1961	Liam Cunningham (FF)	Neil Blaney (IFF)	Paddy Harte (FG)
18th	1965	Liam Cunningham (FF)	Neil Blaney (IFF)	Paddy Harte (FG)
19th	1969	Liam Cunningham (FF)	Neil Blaney (IFF)	Paddy Harte (FG)
20th	1973	Liam Cunningham (FF)	Neil Blaney (IFF)	Paddy Harte (FG)
20th	1976 by-election	Paddy Keaveney (IFF)	Neil Blaney (IFF)	Paddy Harte (FG)
21st	1977	Constituency abolished. See Donegal		
22nd	1981	Hugh Conaghan (FF)	Neil Blaney (IFF)	Paddy Harte (FG)
23rd	1982 (Feb)	Hugh Conaghan (FF)	Neil Blaney (IFF)	Paddy Harte (FG)
24th	1982 (Nov)	Hugh Conaghan (FF)	Neil Blaney (IFF)	Paddy Harte (FG)
25th	1987	Hugh Conaghan (FF)	Neil Blaney (IFF)	Paddy Harte (FG)
26th	1989	Jim McDaid (FF)	Neil Blaney (IFF)	Paddy Harte (FG)
27th	1992	Jim McDaid (FF)	Neil Blaney (IFF)	Paddy Harte (FG)
27th	1996 by-election	Jim McDaid (FF)	Cecilia Keaveney (FF)	Paddy Harte (FG)
28th	1997	Jim McDaid (FF)	Cecilia Keaveney (FF)	Harry Blaney (IFF)
29th	2002	Jim McDaid (FF)	Cecilia Keaveney (FF)	Niall Blaney (IFF)
30th	2007	Jim McDaid (FF)	Joe McHugh (FG)	Niall Blaney (FF)
31st	2011	Charlie McConalogue (FF)	Joe McHugh (FG)	Pádraig Mac Lochlainn (SF)
32nd	2016	Constituency abolished. See Donegal		
