= Cecilia Keaveney =

Irish former politician (born 1968)

Senator
- In office 13 September 2007 – 25 May 2011
- Constituency: Cultural and Educational Panel

Teachta Dála
- In office April 1996 – May 2007
- Constituency: Donegal North-East

Personal details
- Born: 27 November 1968 (age 57) Derry, Northern Ireland
- Party: Fianna Fáil
- Parent: Paddy Keaveney (father)
- Education: University of Ulster

Cecilia Keaveney (born 27 November 1968) is an Irish former Fianna Fáil politician. She was a Teachta Dála (TD) and a Senator from 1996 to 2011.

== Early life ==
She was born in Derry, Northern Ireland. She was educated at Carndonagh Community School in the Inishowen peninsula, County Donegal, and then at the University of Ulster at Jordanstown, Northern Ireland. She is a former music teacher.

Her father Paddy Keaveney was an Independent Fianna Fáil Teachta Dála (TD) for Donegal North-East from 1976 to 1977. She was co-opted to Donegal County Council in 1995 following his death.

== Political career ==
Keaveney was first elected to Dáil Éireann for Donegal North-East in a by-election on 2 April 1996 following the death of Independent Fianna Fáil TD Neil Blaney. She was re-elected at the 1997 general election and 2002 general election but lost her seat at the 2007 general election.

Keaveney was formerly Chair of the Joint Oireachtas Committee on Arts, Sports, Tourism, Community, Rural and Gaeltacht Affairs.

Keaveney lost her seat in a tough 2007 election battle where all three outgoing TDs were Fianna Fáil members. Under the Single transferable vote proportional representation electoral system used in Ireland, it was difficult for all three to be elected. This unusual situation arose when in July 2006 outgoing Fianna Fáil TD Jim McDaid reversed his earlier announcement that he would not seek a nomination to contest the election. In the intervening period Independent Fianna Fáil and its sole TD Niall Blaney had been absorbed into Fianna Fáil. As a result, Joe McHugh of Fine Gael won a seat at her expense.

Keaveney stood successfully for election to Seanad Éireann on the Cultural and Educational Panel at the 2007 election. She did not contest the 2011 Seanad election.

== See also ==
- Families in the Oireachtas

Dáil	Election	Deputy (Party)	Deputy (Party)	Deputy (Party)
17th	1961	Liam Cunningham (FF)	Neil Blaney (IFF)	Paddy Harte (FG)
18th	1965	Liam Cunningham (FF)	Neil Blaney (IFF)	Paddy Harte (FG)
19th	1969	Liam Cunningham (FF)	Neil Blaney (IFF)	Paddy Harte (FG)
20th	1973	Liam Cunningham (FF)	Neil Blaney (IFF)	Paddy Harte (FG)
20th	1976 by-election	Paddy Keaveney (IFF)	Neil Blaney (IFF)	Paddy Harte (FG)
21st	1977	Constituency abolished. See Donegal		
22nd	1981	Hugh Conaghan (FF)	Neil Blaney (IFF)	Paddy Harte (FG)
23rd	1982 (Feb)	Hugh Conaghan (FF)	Neil Blaney (IFF)	Paddy Harte (FG)
24th	1982 (Nov)	Hugh Conaghan (FF)	Neil Blaney (IFF)	Paddy Harte (FG)
25th	1987	Hugh Conaghan (FF)	Neil Blaney (IFF)	Paddy Harte (FG)
26th	1989	Jim McDaid (FF)	Neil Blaney (IFF)	Paddy Harte (FG)
27th	1992	Jim McDaid (FF)	Neil Blaney (IFF)	Paddy Harte (FG)
27th	1996 by-election	Jim McDaid (FF)	Cecilia Keaveney (FF)	Paddy Harte (FG)
28th	1997	Jim McDaid (FF)	Cecilia Keaveney (FF)	Harry Blaney (IFF)
29th	2002	Jim McDaid (FF)	Cecilia Keaveney (FF)	Niall Blaney (IFF)
30th	2007	Jim McDaid (FF)	Joe McHugh (FG)	Niall Blaney (FF)
31st	2011	Charlie McConalogue (FF)	Joe McHugh (FG)	Pádraig Mac Lochlainn (SF)
32nd	2016	Constituency abolished. See Donegal		
