= Pádraig Mac Lochlainn =

Irish politician (born 1973)

Pádraig Mac Lochlainn TD
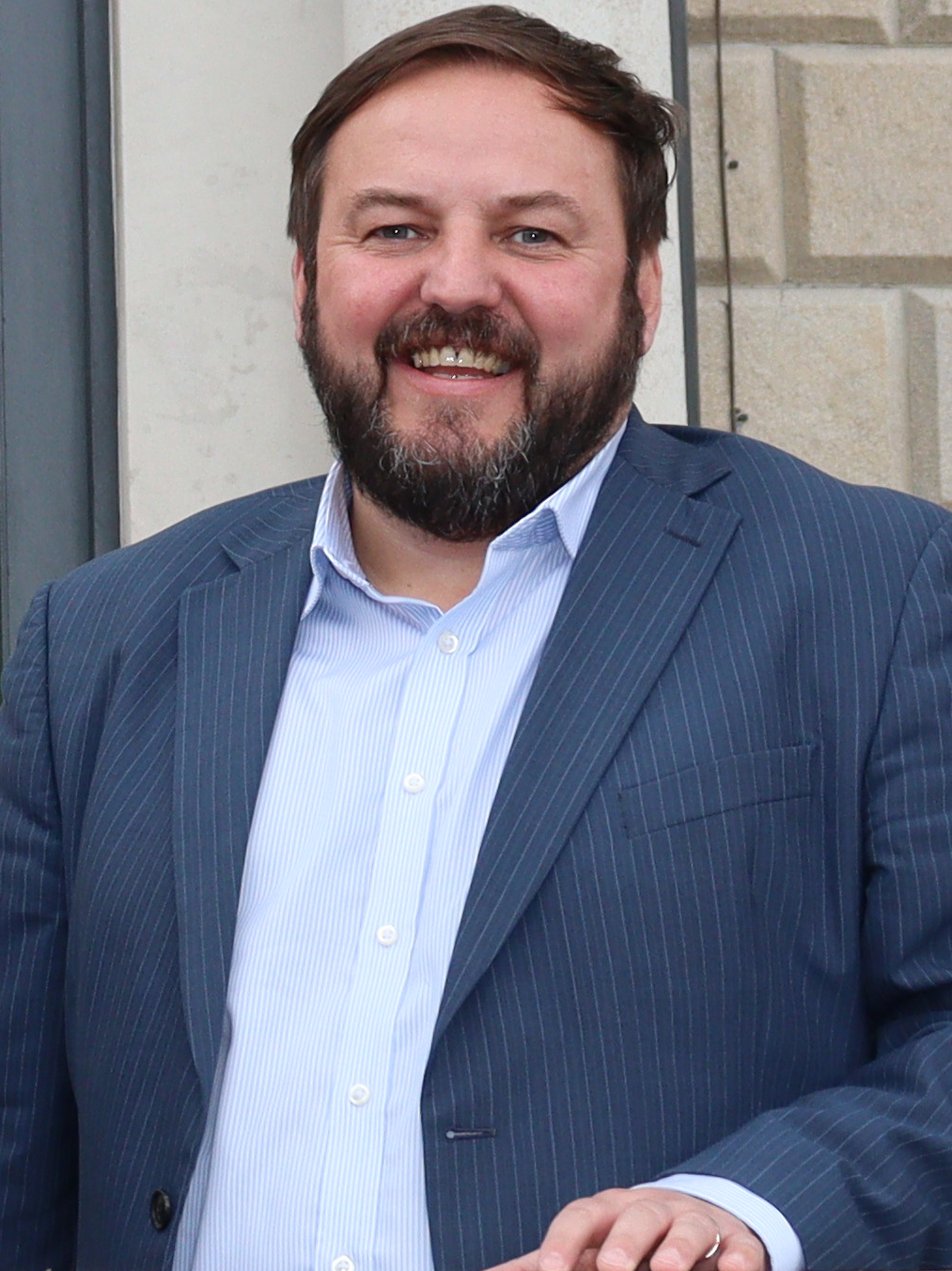
- Mac Lochlainn in 2020

Teachta Dála
- Incumbent
- Assumed office February 2020
- Constituency: Donegal
- In office February 2011 – February 2016
- Constituency: Donegal North-East

Senator
- In office 8 June 2016 – 8 February 2020
- Constituency: Industrial and Commercial Panel

Personal details
- Born: 12 June 1973 (age 53) Leeds, England
- Party: Sinn Féin
- Website: Official website

Pádraig Mac Lochlainn (Irish pronunciation: [ˈpˠaːd̪ˠɾˠəɟ mˠək ˈl̪ˠɔxl̪ˠən̠ʲ]; born 12 June 1973) is an Irish Sinn Féin politician who has been a Teachta Dála (TD) for the Donegal constituency since the 2020 general election, and previously from 2011 to 2016 for the Donegal North-East constituency. He previously served as a Senator for the Industrial and Commercial Panel from 2016 to 2020.

== Early and personal life ==
Mac Lochlainn was born in Leeds, England, on 12 June 1973. The son of two Irish parents, Réamonn and Mary Mac Lochlainn. He is their only child. His father was a Provisional IRA volunteer who spent nine and a half years imprisoned in jails across England. After his release in 1984, his father wrote a book about his prison experience called "Inside an English Jail", which was published posthumously in 1987 under the name of Raymond McLaughlin.

Mary Mac Lochlainn was raised in an Irish Traveller family. He was raised by his mother and grandmother for the duration of his father's imprisonment, and described them as "two strong, loving Traveller women".

After his father's release from prison in England, Mac Lochlainn, then aged 10, moved with his family to his father's home of Buncrana, County Donegal and he has lived there since. His father died in a drowning accident in Shannon, County Clare in 1985. He left school at the age of 14 and later returned to education as an adult through community development studies and distance learning. He worked in the painting and decorating trade for many years.

== Civic and political career ==
He was the Donegal spokesperson for the Irish National Organisation of the Unemployed (INOU) from 1997 to 2001. He also served on the INOU National Executive from 1997 until 2000 as well as representing the organisation on the National Rural Development Forum.

At local level, he was a community director on the Inishowen Partnership Board for 5 years from 1996 to 2001. His work as a community activist and political representative had led him to speak at conferences across Europe on the issues of unemployment, regional neglect and rural poverty.

He was co-opted onto Buncrana Town Council in 2002. He was then subsequently elected onto Buncrana Town Council in 2004 and 2009. He was also elected to Donegal County Council in 2004 representing the Inishowen local electoral area and was re-elected in 2009. Mac Lochlainn served as Mayor of Buncrana twice: 2005–2006 and 2010–2011.

At the national level, he was the Director of Sinn Féin's campaign against the Lisbon Treaty in 2008. He has served as Chairperson of his party's National Councillors Forum (NCF) and has served on the Sinn Féin Ard Comhairle (National Executive). He was appointed to the board of InterTradeIreland, the Trade and Business Development Body in December 2007 and served on the board up until March 2011.

=== Dáil Éireann (2011–2016) ===
Mac Lochlainn was elected to the Dáil on 25 February 2011 for the constituency of Donegal North-East on his third attempt.

He was the Sinn Féin Dáil Spokesperson on Justice, Equality and Defence, serving as a member of the Joint Oireachtas Committee on Justice, Equality and Defence. He was elected Chairperson of the Joint Oireachtas Public Services Oversight and Petitions Committee on 30 January 2013. He previously served as the Sinn Féin Dáil Spokesperson on Foreign Affairs and Trade and was a member of two Joint Oireachtas Committees, Foreign Affairs and Trade and European Affairs.

He served as a member of the British Irish Parliamentary Assembly for almost two years up until January 2013.

Mac Lochlainn has been a prominent supporter of the cause of Palestinian independence and statehood, and he is the Secretary of the Oireachtas Friends of Palestine group of TDs and Senators. As Sinn Féin's Foreign Affairs spokesperson, he strongly supported Ireland's commitment to overseas aid as evidenced in the party position paper he oversaw in early 2012, "Honouring our Legacy: Keeping Ireland at the Heart of Global Justice".

In June 2012, the Irish Independent newspaper alleged that Mac Lochlainn and his party colleague, Deputy Pearse Doherty had "diverted unspent travel and accommodation expenses towards hiring part-time party workers despite these expenses being supposed to be returned to the Oireachtas under rules introduced in 2010". Both Deputies were subsequently found not to have broken any Oireachtas rules.

In December 2012, Mac Lochlainn was suspended from the Dáil after he accused the Ceann Comhairle Seán Barrett of "double standards and hypocrisy".

In early 2013, he published a bill (The Reform of Judicial Appointments Procedures Bill 2013) seeking to end the system of political appointees being made judges in Ireland.

At the 2016 general election, Mac Lochlainn ran as one of three Sinn Féin candidates in the new five-seater Donegal constituency. After a tight race for the final seat in the constituency, he lost narrowly to Thomas Pringle by 184 votes.

=== Seanad Éireann (2016–2020) ===
Following this defeat, Mac Lochlainn served in the Seanad.

=== Return to Dáil Éireann (2020–present) ===
Mac Lochlainn was re-elected to the Dáil at the general election of February 2020 behind Pearse Doherty, both on the first count and both exceeding the quota.

He was appointed to the position of Sinn Féin Party Whip/ Chief Whip in the Dáil on 2 July 2020, and as the party’s Spokesperson on Fisheries and the Marine on 30 July 2020.

At the 2024 general election, Mac Lochlainn was re-elected to the Dáil.

=== Electoral results ===
Elections to the Dáil
Party	Election		FPv	FPv%	Result
Sinn Féin	Donegal North-East	2002	3,611	9.9	Eliminated on count 3/6
Sinn Féin	Donegal North-East	2007	6,733	17.5	Eliminated on count 8/8
Sinn Féin	Donegal North-East	2011	9,278	24.5	Elected on count 3/9
Sinn Féin	Donegal	2016	5,742	7.8	Eliminated on count 13/13
Sinn Féin	Donegal	2020	13,891	17.9	Elected on count 1/9
Sinn Féin	Donegal	2024	9,799	12.8	Elected on count 2/16

Dáil	Election	Deputy (Party)	Deputy (Party)	Deputy (Party)
17th	1961	Liam Cunningham (FF)	Neil Blaney (IFF)	Paddy Harte (FG)
18th	1965	Liam Cunningham (FF)	Neil Blaney (IFF)	Paddy Harte (FG)
19th	1969	Liam Cunningham (FF)	Neil Blaney (IFF)	Paddy Harte (FG)
20th	1973	Liam Cunningham (FF)	Neil Blaney (IFF)	Paddy Harte (FG)
20th	1976 by-election	Paddy Keaveney (IFF)	Neil Blaney (IFF)	Paddy Harte (FG)
21st	1977	Constituency abolished. See Donegal		
22nd	1981	Hugh Conaghan (FF)	Neil Blaney (IFF)	Paddy Harte (FG)
23rd	1982 (Feb)	Hugh Conaghan (FF)	Neil Blaney (IFF)	Paddy Harte (FG)
24th	1982 (Nov)	Hugh Conaghan (FF)	Neil Blaney (IFF)	Paddy Harte (FG)
25th	1987	Hugh Conaghan (FF)	Neil Blaney (IFF)	Paddy Harte (FG)
26th	1989	Jim McDaid (FF)	Neil Blaney (IFF)	Paddy Harte (FG)
27th	1992	Jim McDaid (FF)	Neil Blaney (IFF)	Paddy Harte (FG)
27th	1996 by-election	Jim McDaid (FF)	Cecilia Keaveney (FF)	Paddy Harte (FG)
28th	1997	Jim McDaid (FF)	Cecilia Keaveney (FF)	Harry Blaney (IFF)
29th	2002	Jim McDaid (FF)	Cecilia Keaveney (FF)	Niall Blaney (IFF)
30th	2007	Jim McDaid (FF)	Joe McHugh (FG)	Niall Blaney (FF)
31st	2011	Charlie McConalogue (FF)	Joe McHugh (FG)	Pádraig Mac Lochlainn (SF)
32nd	2016	Constituency abolished. See Donegal		

Dáil	Election	Deputy (Party)	Deputy (Party)	Deputy (Party)	Deputy (Party)	Deputy (Party)	Deputy (Party)	Deputy (Party)	Deputy (Party)
2nd	1921	Joseph O'Doherty (SF)	Samuel O'Flaherty (SF)	Patrick McGoldrick (SF)	Joseph McGinley (SF)	Joseph Sweeney (SF)	Peter Ward (SF)	6 seats 1921–1923	
3rd	1922	Joseph O'Doherty (AT-SF)	Samuel O'Flaherty (AT-SF)	Patrick McGoldrick (PT-SF)	Joseph McGinley (PT-SF)	Joseph Sweeney (PT-SF)	Peter Ward (PT-SF)	6 seats 1921–1923	
4th	1923	Joseph O'Doherty (Rep)	Peadar O'Donnell (Rep)	Patrick McGoldrick (CnaG)	Eugene Doherty (CnaG)	Patrick McFadden (CnaG)	Peter Ward (CnaG)	James Myles (Ind.)	John White (FP)
4th	1924 by-election	Joseph O'Doherty (Rep)	Peadar O'Donnell (Rep)	Patrick McGoldrick (CnaG)	Eugene Doherty (CnaG)	Patrick McFadden (CnaG)	Denis McCullough (CnaG)	James Myles (Ind.)	John White (FP)
5th	1927 (Jun)	Frank Carney (FF)	Neal Blaney (FF)	Daniel McMenamin (NL)	Eugene Doherty (CnaG)	Michael Óg McFadden (CnaG)	Hugh Law (CnaG)	James Myles (Ind.)	John White (FP)
6th	1927 (Sep)	Frank Carney (FF)	Neal Blaney (FF)	Archie Cassidy (Lab)	Eugene Doherty (CnaG)	Michael Óg McFadden (CnaG)	Hugh Law (CnaG)	James Myles (Ind.)	John White (FP)
7th	1932	Frank Carney (FF)	Neal Blaney (FF)	Brian Brady (FF)	Eugene Doherty (CnaG)	Daniel McMenamin (CnaG)	James Dillon (Ind.)	James Myles (Ind.)	John White (CnaG)
8th	1933	Joseph O'Doherty (FF)	Neal Blaney (FF)	Brian Brady (FF)	Hugh Doherty (FF)	Daniel McMenamin (CnaG)	James Dillon (NCP)	James Myles (Ind.)	Michael Óg McFadden (CnaG)
9th	1937	Constituency abolished. See Donegal East and Donegal West							

Dáil	Election	Deputy (Party)	Deputy (Party)	Deputy (Party)	Deputy (Party)	Deputy (Party)
21st	1977	Hugh Conaghan (FF)	Joseph Brennan (FF)	Neil Blaney (IFF)	James White (FG)	Paddy Harte (FG)
21st	1980 by-election	Hugh Conaghan (FF)	Clement Coughlan (FF)	Neil Blaney (IFF)	James White (FG)	Paddy Harte (FG)
22nd	1981	Constituency abolished. See Donegal North-East and Donegal South-West				

Dáil	Election	Deputy (Party)	Deputy (Party)	Deputy (Party)	Deputy (Party)	Deputy (Party)
32nd	2016	Pearse Doherty (SF)	Pat "the Cope" Gallagher (FF)	Thomas Pringle (Ind.)	Charlie McConalogue (FF)	Joe McHugh (FG)
33rd	2020	Pearse Doherty (SF)	Pádraig Mac Lochlainn (SF)	Thomas Pringle (Ind.)	Charlie McConalogue (FF)	Joe McHugh (FG)
34th	2024	Pearse Doherty (SF)	Pádraig Mac Lochlainn (SF)	Charles Ward (100%R)	Charlie McConalogue (FF)	Pat "the Cope" Gallagher (FF)
