= Independent Fianna Fáil =

Independent Fianna Fáil Fianna Fáil Neamhspleách
- Leader: Neil Blaney
- Founded: 1972
- Dissolved: 2006
- Split from: Fianna Fáil
- Merged into: Fianna Fáil
- Ideology: Irish republicanism
- European affiliation: European Free Alliance
- European Parliament group: Technical Group of Independents (1979–1984); Rainbow Group (1989–1994)

Independent Fianna Fáil (IFF), sometimes called the Independent Fianna Fáil Republican Party, was a splinter republican party in Ireland created by Neil Blaney after his expulsion from Fianna Fáil following the Irish Arms Crisis (1969–1970). The party ceased to exist on 26 July 2006. It was never an officially registered political party: Niall Blaney said in 2003 "I am an Independent and a member of an organisation known locally as Independent Fianna Fáil". Its candidates were listed on ballot papers without a party label, or the use of the "Non-party" label available to independents. However, the Oireachtas members' database lists Independent Fianna Fáil members separately.

== Overview ==
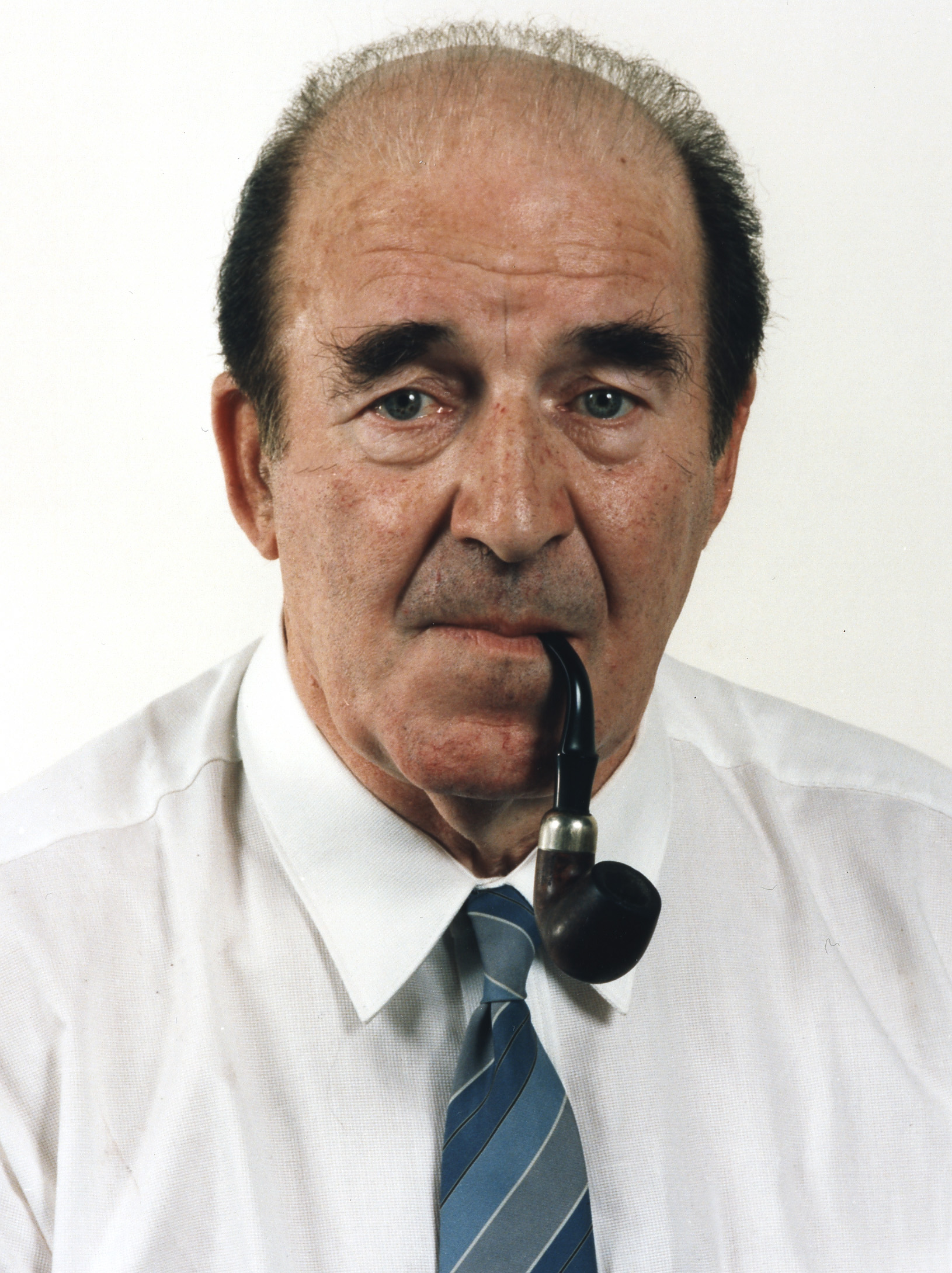
Party founder and central figure Neil Blaney, pictured here in 1990.

The party existed mainly in County Donegal in Ireland and, in particular, in Blaney's former constituency of Donegal North-East.

Paddy Keaveney (father of Fianna Fáil Senator Cecilia Keaveney) was elected for Independent Fianna Fáil in the by-election in 1976 following the death of Liam Cunningham. Keaveney lost his seat at the 1977 general election. The group also briefly had a senator, James Larkin, which was part of the confidence and supply agreement made with Fianna Fáil after the February 1982 general election.

In 1979 Neil Blaney was elected to the European Parliament for the Connacht–Ulster constituency. He sat in the Technical Group of Independents which was a technical alliance of mainly left-wing MEPs who were not allied with either the Communists and Allies group or the mainstream social-democratic parties of the Socialist Group. Blaney served as chair of the group along with the Italian Radical Marco Pannella and Danish left-wing Eurosceptic Jens-Peter Bonde. Blaney narrowly lost his seat in the 1984 election but was returned to serve as an MEP in 1989 election where he sat with the regionalist Rainbow Group.

Independent Fianna Fáil was a founder member of the European Free Alliance in 1981, and remained a member of the organisation until 1995.

Tadhg Culbert was a councillor for Independent Fianna Fáil in the 1980s, before becoming an independent and eventually joining the official Fianna Fáil. IFF had also had representation on Roscommon County Council – where Paddy Lenihan, brother of Mary O'Rourke and uncle of Brian Lenihan Jnr, defected from Fianna Fáil – and on Leitrim County Council where Larry McGowan also defected, both doing so in 1981. They both retired in 1999, and neither seat was defended on the party's behalf.

Harry Blaney became the leader of IFF following Neil Blaney's death in 1995.

Blaney's nephew Niall Blaney was elected as an Independent Fianna Fáil Teachta Dála (TD) for the constituency in 2002, and in the 2004 local elections there were two IFF county councillors – both members of Donegal County Council – and two town councillors, one a member of Letterkenny Town Council and one a member of Buncrana Town Council.

In a number of elections Paddy Kelly stood unsuccessfully under the Independent Fianna Fáil banner in elections in Donegal South-West; he was however elected to the council for the Glenties ward and served as a member until 2004.

== Blaney legacy ==
Neal Blaney was elected to the 5th Dáil on 12 August 1927 as Fianna Fáil Teachta Dála and successfully contested all general elections until the 13th Dáil in 1948. He was defeated in the 1938 general election but was elected to the 3rd Seanad on the Agricultural Panel.

His son, Neil Blaney, successfully contested one by-election to succeed his father and 14 subsequent general elections. He was a TD from 1948 to 1995 and a cabinet minister on several occasions.

Neil Blaney's brother, Harry Blaney, succeeded his brother Neil and was a TD in the 28th Dáil. Harry's son Niall Blaney was a TD in the 29th Dáil and the 30th Dáil.

Two of Neil Blaney's sons, MacDara and Eamonn, stood in the 2011 general election for New Vision.

== Absorption by Fianna Fáil ==
Following talks with Fianna Fáil in the middle of 2006, Independent Fianna Fáil reunited with "official" Fianna Fáil on 26 July following a formal application by Niall Blaney to join Fianna Fáil. The merger between the two organisations was opposed by other members of the Blaney family, including all seven children of Neil Blaney and his widow Eva who issued a damning press release prior to Niall Blaney's decision castigating the Fianna Fáil party and disassociating themselves from any so-called 'truce' with them.

== Other uses ==
Jackie Healy-Rae, TD for Kerry South, ran under the banner of Independent Fianna Fáil, using the name on his posters and flyers as part of the canvass for the 2007 general election, although he had no connection to Neil Blaney's Independent Fianna Fáil.

Former Fianna Fáil Dublin City Councillor Tony Taaffe ran in the 1997 general election using the Independent Fianna Fáil banner but was not associated with Blaney's party.

In October 2021 former Fianna Fáil TD Marc MacSharry suggested he was considering reviving Independent Fianna Fáil.

== See also ==
- Category:Independent Fianna Fáil politicians
