= 1974 Donegal County Council election =

1974 Irish local government election

← 1967	18 June 1974	1979 →

All 28 seats on Donegal County Council
	First party	Second party	Third party
Party	Fianna Fáil	Fine Gael	Independent Fianna Fáil
Seats won	10	10	4
	Fourth party	Fifth party	Sixth party
Party	Sinn Féin (Official)	Donegal Progressive Party	Independent
Seats won	1	1	2
- Map showing the area of Donegal County Council
Council control before election
Fianna Fáil
Council control after election
Fianna Fáil

An election to all 28 seats on Donegal County Council took place on 18 June 1974 as part of the Irish local elections. Councillors were elected from five local electoral areas for a five-year term of office on the electoral system of proportional representation by means of the single transferable vote (PR-STV).

== Results by party ==
Party	Seats	1st pref	FPv%
Fianna Fáil	10	19,767	35.64%
Fine Gael	10	19,085	34.41%
Independent Fianna Fáil	4	6,143	11.07%
Sinn Féin (Official)	1	2,178	3.93%
Donegal Progressive Party	1	1,745	3.14%
Sinn Féin (Provisional)	0	1,021	1.84%
Labour	0	242	0.44%
Independent	2	7,029	9.52%
Total	28	55,465	100.00%

== Results by local electoral area ==
- Sitting in italics

=== Buncrana ===
Buncrana: 6 seats
Party	Candidate	FPv%	Count	
Party	Candidate	FPv%	1	2
Fine Gael	Bertie Boggs*	21.7%	2,604	
Fianna Fáil	Alex Diver*	10.3%	1,237	
Fianna Fáil	Hugh Conaghan*	10.0%	1,204	
Independent	Tony Gill*	9.5%	1,145	
Fianna Fáil	Conal Doogan*	8.0%	963	
Fine Gael	Sean McLaughlin	7.7%	927	
Independent Fianna Fáil	Michael Deery*	7.6%	911	
Fine Gael	Harry Gillen	7.0%	845	
Fianna Fáil	Dermot McLaughlin	7.0%	836	
Fine Gael	Patrick McLaughlin	5.7%	687	
Fine Gael	Helen O'Sullivan	2.6%	317	
Independent Fianna Fáil	Dermot Kelly	2.6%	314	
Electorate: 16,729 Valid: 11,990 Quota: 1,650

=== Donegal ===
Donegal: 6 seats
Party	Candidate	FPv%	Count						
Party	Candidate	FPv%	1	2	3	4	5	6	7
Fianna Fáil	Clement Coughlan*	18.50%	2,1621						
Fine Gael	Michael Melly*	14.60%	1,703						
Fianna Fáil	Brendan Murrin*	11.90%	1,391	1,496	1,496	1,499	1,506	1,578	1,626
Fianna Fáil	Sean McEniff*	11.70%	1,370	1,418	1,424	1,427	1,448	1,522	1,598
Fine Gael	Francis Cunningham*	11.1%	1,294	1,308	1,314	1,317	1,339	1,351	1,374
Fine Gael	Colm Gallagher*	9.7%	1,130	1,238	1,253	1,267	1,401	1,444	1,618
Sinn Féin (Provisional)	Joe O'Neill	8.8%	1,021	1,053	1,058	1,062	1,064	1,103	1,284
Independent	Frank Muldoon	6.5%	754	820	821	826	866	954	—
Independent	Fredrick Scott	3.6%	417	436	438	444	—		
Fianna Fáil	Eamon Timoney	3.1%	366	463	464	473	501	—	
Independent	Thomas McCormack	0.5%	57	63	63	—			
Electorate: 15,408 Valid: 11,665 (98.85%) Spoilt: 135 Quota: 1,842 Turnout: 11,800 (76.58%)

=== Glenties ===
Glenties: 6 seats
Party	Candidate	FPv%	Count							
Party	Candidate	FPv%	1	2	3	4	5	6	7	8
Fianna Fáil	Paddy Delap*	21.2%	2,294							
Sinn Féin (Official)	Seamus Rogers*	14.6%	1,580							
Independent Fianna Fáil	John Kelly*	11.2%	1,209	1,281	1,287	1,292	1,323	1,342	1,348	1,372
Fine Gael	John Gorman*	9.0%	971	996	1,004	1,005	1,222	1,228	1,248	1,255
Fine Gael	Donal Whelan	8.2%	883	886	966	1,146	1,176	1,181	1,188	1,188
Fine Gael	James Doohan*	8.1%	873	904	913	915	1,208	1,216	1,219	1,220
Fianna Fáil	Joseph Campbell*	7.1%	771	849	925	1,220	1,228	1,710		
Fine Gael	Patrick Doherty	6.4%	689	831	840	—				
Fianna Fáil	Peter J. O'Keefe	6.0%	647	986	987	1,025	1,039	—		
Fianna Fáil	Seamus Gallagher	5.5%	598	652	742	—				
Independent	Anne Barton	2.7%	289	295	—					
Electorate: 16,603 Valid: 10,804 Quota: 1,544

=== Letterkenny ===
Letterkenny: 6 seats
Party	Candidate	FPv%	Count	
Party	Candidate	FPv%	1	2
Fianna Fáil	Paddy McGowan*	17.2%	2,292	
Fine Gael	Paddy Harte TD*	15.1%	2,018	
Donegal Progressive Party	Winston Patterson*	13.1%	1,745	
Fianna Fáil	Bernard McGlinchey*	12.9%	1,729	
Fine Gael	J.J. Reid*	6.5%	862	
Independent	James Fields	5.9%	692	
Independent Fianna Fáil	Charles O'Donnell*	5.5%	730	
Independent Fianna Fáil	Patrick Friel	5.4%	726	
Independent Fianna Fáil	Henry Patton	4.5%	601	
Sinn Féin (Official)	Sean O'Donnell	4.5%	598	
Fine Gael	Daniel Coyle	3.8%	513	
Fine Gael	May McClintock	3.8%	508	
Labour	Richard Duffy	1.8%	242	
Electorate: 18,770 Valid: 13 356 Quota: 1,909

=== Milford ===
Milford: 4 seats
Party	Candidate	FPv%	Count	
Party	Candidate	FPv%	1	2
Independent Fianna Fáil	Harry Blaney*	19.4%	1,695	
Independent	Noel McGinley*	14.7%	1,283	
Fine Gael	Joachim Loughrey*	14.3%	1,254	
Fine Gael	William McCafferty*	13.2%	1,152	
Fianna Fáil	Ian McGarvey	7.8%	680	
Independent Fianna Fáil	Hugh Boyle	6.5%	566	
Independent	Joseph Gallagher	6.3%	547	
Independent Fianna Fáil	Hugh Gallagher	3.8%	331	
Fianna Fáil	Edward McGettigan	3.4%	298	
Fianna Fáil	Dorothy Borland	3.2%	283	
Fine Gael	Brendan McDaid	2.7%	234	
Independent Fianna Fáil	John Grier	1.8%	157	
Fine Gael	Manus Dennison	1.5%	134	
Fianna Fáil	John Boyce	1.5%	133	
Electorate: 10,535 Valid: 8,747(98.38%) Spoilt: 173 Quota: 1,732 Turnout: 8,891 (83.03%)
