= 1991 Donegal County Council election =

Part of the 1991 Irish local elections

← 1985	27 June 1991	1999 →

All 29 seats on Donegal County Council
	First party	Second party	Third party
Party	Fianna Fáil	Fine Gael	Independent Fianna Fáil
Seats won	11	9	4
Seat change	Steady	Steady	▼1
	Fourth party	Fifth party	Sixth party
Party	Sinn Féin	Donegal Progressive Party	Workers' Party
Seats won	1	1	1
Seat change	▼1	Steady	Steady
	Seventh party	Eighth party
Party	Labour	Independent
Seats won	1	1
Seat change	▲1	▲1
- Area of Donegal County Council
Council control before election
Fianna Fáil
Council control after election
Fianna Fáil

An election to all 29 seats on Donegal County Council took place on 27 June 1991 as part of the 1991 Irish local elections. County Donegal was divided into 6 local electoral areas (LEAs) to elect councillors for a five-year term of office on the electoral system of proportional representation by means of the single transferable vote (PR-STV). This term was extended twice, first to 1998, then to 1999.

== Results by party ==
Party	Seats	±	1st pref.	FPv%	±%
Fianna Fáil	11	Steady	20,636	36.20%	
Fine Gael	9	Steady	14,096	24.72%	
Independent Fianna Fáil	4	▼1	11,760	20.63%	
Sinn Féin	1	▼1	2,605	4.57%	
Donegal Progressive Party	1	Steady	1,775	3.11%	
Workers' Party	1	Steady	1,427	2.50%	
Labour	1	▲1	1,317	2.31%	
Independent	1	▲1	3,017	5.29%	
Total	29	Steady	57,013	100.00%	—

== Results by local electoral area ==
*: Outgoing councillor.

=== Buncrana ===
Buncrana: 6 seats
Party	Candidate	FPv%	Count							
Party	Candidate	FPv%	1	2	3	4	5	6	7	8
Fianna Fáil	Hugh Conaghan	14.9%	1,733							
Fine Gael	Bernard McGuinness	13.1%	1,524	1,544	1,545	1,746				
Sinn Féin	Jim Ferry	11.6%	1,344	1,390	1,398	1,405	1,501	1,503	1,668	
Fianna Fáil	Paddy Keaveney	9.3%	1,082	1,218	1,229	1,420	1,445	1,461	1,624	1,751
Fianna Fáil	Denis McGonagle	9.0%	1,046	1,053	1,056	1,064	1,084	1,084	1,181	1,519
Fine Gael	Seamus Gill	8.3%	958	962	966	1,021	1,138	1,199	1,348	1,384
Fianna Fáil	John McLaughlin	7.7%	888	899	901	919	943	947	990	
Independent Fianna Fáil	Albert Doherty	6.9%	798	864	871	880	999	1,002	1,031	1,240
Fianna Fáil	Joseph Doherty	6.4%	740	759	792	798	923	926		
Independent Fianna Fáil	Philip Diggin	5.0%	579	611	617	623				
Fine Gael	Mary McGroarty	4.3%	503	536	537					
Independent Fianna Fáil	Conal Gillespie	3.5%	403							
Electorate: 19,588 Valid: 11,598 (59.21%) Spoilt: 159 Quota: 1,657 Turnout: 11,757 (60.02%)

=== Donegal ===
Donegal: 6 seats
Party	Candidate	FPv%	Count										
Party	Candidate	FPv%	1	2	3	4	5	6	7	8	9	10	11
Fianna Fáil	Mary Coughlan TD	14.7%	1,747										
Fianna Fáil	Sean McEniff	12.5%	1,484	1,489	1,496	1,547	1,550	1,673	1,679	1,686	1,893		
Fine Gael	Colm Gallagher	10.1%	1,196	1,205	1,267	1,273	1,284	1,293	1,329	1,515	1,564	1,564	1,818
Fianna Fáil	Peter Kennedy	9.9%	1,168	1,185	1,210	1,210	1,213	1,227	1,248	1,274	1,320	1,340	1,356
Fine Gael	Frank O'Kelly	9.2%	1,085	1,086	1,091	1,121	1,124	1,171	1,180	1,205	1,337	1,390	1,515
Fianna Fáil	James McBrearty	8.7%	1,026	1,029	1,035	1,037	1,129	1,133	1,174	1,204	1,224	1,233	1,564
Fianna Fáil	Paddy McCloskey	6.2%	732	738	741	744	760	761	909	1,038	1,058	1,153	1,214
Fine Gael	Patrick McShane	6.1%	718	719	720	720	796	803	885	1,022	1,049	1,050	
Independent Fianna Fáil	Donal Kelly	4.8%	569	571	579	601	668	794	799	817			
Fine Gael	John Boyle	4.7%	552	556	560	563	569	571	677				
Independent	Tommy Murphy	3.8%	456	458	463	477	477	477					
Independent	Joe O'Neill	3.2%	377	377	403	465	472						
Fianna Fáil	Tony Byrne	2.7%	318	319	329	333							
Fine Gael	Michael Mulhern	1.9%	220	221	226								
Independent	Tom Kennedy	1.7%	202										
Electorate: 18,138 Valid: 11,850 (65.33%) Spoilt: 131 Quota: 1,693 Turnout: 11,981 (66.05%)

=== Glenties ===
Glenties: 6 seats
Party	Candidate	FPv%	Count						
Party	Candidate	FPv%	1	2	3	4	5	6	7
Fine Gael	Connell Boyle	13.1%	1,528	1,529	1,547	1,703			
Fianna Fáil	Francis Brennan	12.3%	1,427	1,441	1,443	1,592	1,629	1,677	
Workers' Party	Seamus Rogers	12.2%	1,425	1,453	1,599	1,724			
Independent Fianna Fáil	Paddy Kelly	10.1%	1,175	1,285	1,339	1,446	1,452	1,489	1,526
Fianna Fáil	James Breslin	8.7%	1,010	1,037	1,077	1,106	1,114	1,299	1,363
Fine Gael	Maureen Doohan	8.0%	932	1,046	1,061	1,070	1,073	1,095	1,435
Independent	Fred Coll	7.7%	899	915	1,013	1,022	1,027	1,231	1,513
Fine Gael	Pádraig Doherty	7.5%	873	885	921	933	934	1,024	
Fianna Fáil	Feardorca O'Colla	6.1%	709	787	839	842	843		
Independent Fianna Fáil	John Boyle	5.5%	635	638	673				
Independent Fianna Fáil	Jimmy Doherty	4.7%	543	547					
Fianna Fáil	Hugh McGarvey	4.1%	483	444	447				
Electorate: 19,969 Valid: 11,639 (58.29%) Spoilt: 132 Quota: 1,663 Turnout: 11,771 (59.95%)

=== Letterkenny ===
Letterkenny: 7 seats
Party	Candidate	FPv%	Count									
Party	Candidate	FPv%	1	2	3	4	5	6	7	8	9	10
Donegal Progressive Party	Jim Devenney	12.9%	1,775									
Fianna Fáil	Sen. Patrick McGowan	11.7%	1,611	1,614	1,689	1,691	1,704	1,727				
Independent Fianna Fáil	Danny Harkin	10.8%	1,489	1,491	1,512	1,519	1,534	1,558	1,640	1,770		
Labour	Seán Maloney	9.6%	1,317	1,344	1,362	1,364	1,470	1,625	1,683	1,809		
Fine Gael	Paddy Harte	9.5%	1,309	1,364	1,402	1,427	1,476	1,527	1,565	1,592	1,601	1,713
Fine Gael	J.J. Reid	8.2%	1,136	1,164	1,182	1,191	1,215	1,233	1,318	1,338	1,349	1,384
Fianna Fáil	Bernard McGlinchey	7.9%	1,087	1,103	1,175	1,176	1,204	1,254	1,294	1,418	1,446	1,563
Sinn Féin	Liam McElhinney	6.9%	946	950	956	956	971	982	1,028	1,067	1,075	1,216
Independent Fianna Fáil	Charles Meehan	6.1%	844	847	858	861	866	873	880	965	980	
Independent Fianna Fáil	James Larkin	3.8%	520	537	541	541	553	610	632			
Independent	Eileen Gillespie	3.2%	439	440	444	446	517	544				
Independent	P.J. Blake	3.1%	424	438	444	444	473					
Green	Rory Brophy	2.8%	382	397	404	405						
Fianna Fáil	Billy Patterson	2.2%	300	306								
Fine Gael	Joe O'Donnell	1.5%	203									
Electorate: 24,915 Valid: 13,782 (55.32%) Spoilt: 158 Quota: 1,723 Turnout: 13,940 (55.95%)

=== Milford ===
Milford: 4 seats
Party	Candidate	FPv%	Count			
Party	Candidate	FPv%	1	2	3	4
Independent Fianna Fáil	Edward O'Donnell	19.8%	1,615	1,667		
Independent Fianna Fáil	Harry Blaney	18.9%	1,540	1,613	1,641	
Fianna Fáil	Noel McGinley	18.5%	1,506	1,531	1,597	1,851
Fine Gael	Joachim Loughrey	11.4%	926	935	1,298	1,370
Fianna Fáil	Elizabeth Grier	10.5%	857	887	975	1,038
Independent Fianna Fáil	Sean McGee	9.0%	732	814	837	
Fine Gael	Lexie Diver	9.0%	653	659		
Sinn Féin	Pat Doherty	3.9%	315			
Electorate: 12,016 Valid: 8,144 (69.36%) Spoilt: 102 Quota: 1,629 Turnout: 8,246 (70.12%)
