= 1960 Cork Corporation election =

Part of the 1960 Irish local elections

The 1960 Cork Corporation election took place on 29 June as part of that year's local election to elect all 21 seats on Cork City Council. This was the last time the entire county borough of Cork formed a single electoral area. The election was conducted by means of the single transferable vote. There were 72 candidates. The count began on 30 June and concluded in the early hours of 3 July after 63 counts.

Electoral law at the time of the election empowered the Minister for Local Government to split county boroughs into multiple borough electoral areas only if the council requested, which Cork City Council had not done. The Electoral Act 1963 allowed the minister to act unilaterally. After the 1965 boundary extension, the borough was divided into 6 borough electoral districts.

At the 1967 local elections, the larger parties increased their proportion of seats.

== Results ==
Poll details
Registered electors	45,775
Valid votes	22,024
Quota for election	1,002

Summary by party
Party	Abbrev	Cands	1st-pref vote	Seats	Change	Notes
Fianna Fáil	FF	16	(Note: Erroneous total of 6,730 in source.)6,732	7	−1	
Fine Gael	FG	9	(Note: Erroneous total of 3,595 in source.)3,615	3	0	
Labour	Lab	9	3,495	3	−1	
Corporation Tenants Association	Ten	6	1,810	2	+2	
Ratepayers' Association	RP	7	1,734	2	+2	
T.E.A.M.	TEAM	8	1,278	1	+1	"The Emigration Action Movement", a new local group, which merged with Labour by the 1967 election
Cork Civic Party	Civ	8	1,259	1	−1	The party dissolved in 1966 after the 1965 LEA changes.
Poblacht Chríostúil	PCh	3	209	0	0	Candidates' names were in Irish on the ballot paper.
Sinn Féin	SF	0	0	0	−2	Did not contest the election in Cork.
Independents	Ind	6	1,892	2	0	

The first six candidates elected gained the honorific title alderman; the other 15 were "councillors". Seán McCarthy, John Bermingham and Gus Healy were also elected to Cork County Council from the Cork Rural LEA which bordered the city.

Results by candidate
Name	Party	1st-pref vote	Order elected
Stephen D. Barrett (Note: Outgoing councillor)	FG	1650	1
John Galvin	FF	1486	2
John W. Reidy	Ind	1348	3
Seán Casey	Lab	1229	4
Sam Allen	FF	973	5
Josephine Joyce	RP	774	6
Thomas Pearse Leahy	TEAM	690	7
Anthony Barry	FG	339	8
Gus Healy	FF	582	9
John Bermingham	FG	474	10
Jane Dowdall	FF	535	11
James Hickey	Lab	553	12
William Kenneally	Ten	531	13
Dan Cronin	FF	534	14
Seán McCarthy	FF	350	15
Valentine Jago	Civ	257	16
J. Barrett	Ten	335	17
J. F. Lucey	Ind	335	18
Pearse Wyse	FF	348	19
E. P. Stanley	RP	216	20
Cornelius Desmond	Lab	306	21
P. J. O'Donovan	FF	354	
C. Burns	Ten	334	
D. P. Kelleher	FF	333	
J. O'Gorman	FF	303	
John F. O'Dwyer	FG	289	
J. Harrington	Lab	285	
Con Connolly	Lab	274	
Vincent O'Connell	FG	270	
G. McCarthy	Ten	265	
P. Madden	TEAM	249	
T. Power	Ten	247	
H. Reid	Lab	242	
P. McCarthy	Lab	240	
A. Aherne	FF	240	
T. Jones	Civ	234	
D. Breen	Civ	232	
R. G. Sutton	FG	227	
M. McMullen	Lab	214	
Walter Furlong	Civ	210	
C. D. Dowman	RP	206	
K. Collins	RP	192	
J. J. O'Riordan	FF	182	
J. J. Kelly	FG	169	
M. Mullins	FF	163	
J. Quirke	FF	161	
Richard Anthony	Lab	152	
R. Stokes	RP	144	
L. Neville	FG	126	
C. O'Callaghan	RP	115	
Sylvester Cotter	PCh	111	
D. Martell	FF	103	
J. McCarthy	Ten	98	
D. P. Long	TEAM	97	
T. O'Sullivan	Ind	95	
D. Beavan	Civ	88	
C. Cooke	RP	87	
M. Donegan	Civ	86	
Fred Geaney	FF	85	
Maurice O'Connell	Ind	84	
R. L. Anthony	Civ	83	
S. D. Ó Dubhghaill	PCh	76	
F. M. Dooley	FG	71	
Frank Mockler	Civ	69	
J. J. O'Connell	TEAM	58	
P. O'Brien	TEAM	52	
W. Murphy	TEAM	52	
R. Longfield	TEAM	46	
D. O'Leary	TEAM	34	
P. Ó hAngusa	PCh	22	
James McCarthy	Ind	21	
J. Bruton	Ind	9	
