= 1985 Donegal County Council election =

Part of the 1985 Irish local elections

- 20 June 1985

All 29 seats on Donegal County Council
	First party	Second party	Third party
Party	Fianna Fáil	Fine Gael	Independent Fianna Fáil
Seats won	11	9	5
Seat change	Steady	▼1	▲1
	Fourth party	Fifth party	Sixth party
Party	Sinn Féin	Workers' Party	Donegal Progressive Party
Seats won	2	1	Steady
Seat change	▲1	Steady	▲1
- Area of Donegal County Council

An election to all 29 seats on Donegal County Council took place on 20 June 1985 as part of the 1985 Irish local elections. County Donegal was divided into six local electoral areas (LEAs) to elect councillors for a five-year term of office on the electoral system of proportional representation by means of the single transferable vote (PR-STV). This term was extended for a further year, to 1991. In February 1985 the County and County Borough Commission recommended that membership in Donegal County Council be increased, resulting in the available seats increasing to 29.

== Results by party ==
Party	Seats	±	1st pref	FPv%	±%
Fianna Fáil	11	Steady	22,259	35.94%	▼4.14%
Fine Gael	9	▼1	18,347	29.62%	▼0.23%
Independent Fianna Fáil	5	▲1	10,597	17.1%	▲0.35%
Sinn Féin	2	▲1	4,290	6.93%	▲1.93%
Donegal Progressive Party	1	Steady	1,506	2.46%	▼0.36%
Workers' Party	1	Steady	1,352	2.2%	▼1.39%
Labour	0	Steady	425	0.7%	—
Independent	0	▼1	3,165	5.55%	▲0.82%
Total	29	▲1	57,013	100.00%	—

== Results by local electoral area ==
- Sitting in italics

=== Buncrana ===
Buncrana: 6 seats
Party	Candidate	FPv%	Count									
Party	Candidate	FPv%	1	2	3	4	5	6	7	8	9	10
Fianna Fáil	Hugh Conaghan TD*		1,977									
Fine Gael	Bernard McGuinness*		1,681	1,709	1,713	1,722	1,879					
Sinn Féin	Eddie Fullerton*		1,384	1,400	1,419	1,526	1,546	1,548	1,651	1,677	1,843	
Fianna Fáil	Denis McGonagle		1,218	1,242	1,255	1,269	1,278	1,280	1,421	1,425	1,716	1,735
Fine Gael	Seamus Gill		975	987	993	1,041	1,143	1,160	1,274	1,578	1,603	1,613
Independent Fianna Fáil	Paddy Keaveney*		927	934	941	1,056	1,107	1,111	1,132	1,302	1,577	1,601
Fianna Fáil	Seán McBride*		905	908	936	958	973	974	1,202	1,270	1,306	1,314
Independent Fianna Fáil	Albert Doherty		787	861	866	967	980	980	1,020	1,034		
Fianna Fáil	Bríd Bonner		640	652	752	810	825	826				
Fine Gael	Harry Gillen		618	629	630	641	773	846	851			
Fine Gael	Kenneth Weir		565	581	584	587						
Independent Fianna Fáil	Helen Doherty		547	552	564							
Labour	Martin Robins		223									
Electorate: 19,273 Valid: 12,447 (64.58%) Spoilt: 207 Quota: 1,779 Turnout: 12,654

=== Donegal ===
Donegal: 6 seats
Party	Candidate	FPv%	Count							
Party	Candidate	FPv%	1	2	3	4	5	6	7	8
Fianna Fáil	Cathal Coughlan TD*		2,975							
Fine Gael	Frank O'Kelly*		1,687	1,719	1,733	1,763	1,833			
Fianna Fáil	Sean McEniff		1,631	1,785	1,800	1,851				
Fine Gael	Colm Gallagher*		1,274	1,410	1,413	1,414	1,592	1,688	1,689	1,694
Fianna Fáil	James McBrearty*		1,183	1,331	1,334	1,337	1,465	1,555	1,561	1,562
Fine Gael	Padraig Carr		1,021	1,042	1,042	1,047	1,494	1,551	1,554	1,559
Sinn Féin	Anthony O'Malley-Daly		1,012	1,071	1,083	1,109	1,149			
Fine Gael	Tommy Murphy*		924	996	997	1,002				
Fianna Fáil	Peter Kennedy		837	1,357	1,360	1,362	1,390	1,565	1,570	
Independent	Michael Mulhern		142	145	156					
Independent	Bernard Mangan		65	73						
Electorate: 17,721 Valid: 12,751 (71.95%) Spoilt: 115 Quota: 1,822 Turnout: 12,866

=== Glenties ===
Glenties: 6 seats
Party	Candidate	FPv%	Count									
Party	Candidate	FPv%	1	2	3	4	5	6	7	8	9	10
Fianna Fáil	Pat The Cope Gallagher TD*		2,095									
Independent Fianna Fáil	Paddy Delap*		1,394	1,406	1,438	1,468	1,486	1,502	1,667	1,678	1,681	1,964
Workers' Party	Seamus Rogers*		1,352	1,390	1,448	1,500	1,515	1,728	1,800	2,055		
Independent Fianna Fáil	John Kelly*		1,089	1,092	1,113	1,159	1,272	1,279	1,295	1,306	1,311	1,324
Fine Gael	Maureen Doohan		1,071	1,073	1,079	1,080	1,174	1,220	1,244	1,255	1,261	1,674
Fine Gael	Connell Boyle		1,068	1,074	1,080	1,113	1,117	1,215	1,216	1,433	1,466	1,671
Independent	Michael Lynch		1,011	1,014	1,020	1,049	1,051	1,056	1,057			
Fianna Fáil	Sean McNelis*		1,005	1,032	1,036	1,176	1,216	1,231	1,402	1,723	1,781	1,794
Fine Gael	Fred Coll*		988	992	1,004	1,005	1,008	1,090	1,185	1,195	1,200	
Fianna Fáil	Sean Hanrai O Gallchoir		647	682	720	725	854	875				
Fine Gael	Pat Gallagher		586	610	610	614	620					
Fianna Fáil	Hugh McGarvey		485	503	509	513						
Independent Fianna Fáil	John McLoone		376	378	383							
Sinn Féin	Breandan O Rahallai		264	266								
Electorate: 19,700 Valid: 13,431 (68.18%) Spoilt: 146 Quota: 1,919 Turnout: 13,577

=== Letterkenny ===
Letterkenny: 7 seats
Party	Candidate	FPv%	Count										
Party	Candidate	FPv%	1	2	3	4	5	6	7	8	9	10	11
Fianna Fáil	Patrick McGowan*		1,778	1,785	1,837								
Fine Gael	Paddy Harte TD*		1,563	1,581	1,589	1,617	1,653	1,690	1,808	1,867			
Donegal Progressive Party	William Buchanan*		1,506	1,518	1,524	1,531	1,538	1,541	1,591	1,626	1,627	1,629	1,629
Fianna Fáil	Bernard McGlinchey*		1,380	1,393	1,402	1,487	1,583	1,755	1,862				
Sinn Féin	Liam McElhinney		1,321	1,343	1,378	1,392	1,412	1,469	1,606	1,707	1,710	1,716	1,718
Fine Gael	J.J. Reid*		1,091	1,109	1,161	1,174	1,205	1,231	1,251	1,329	1,345	1,346	1,361
Independent Fianna Fáil	Danny Harkin		1,088	1,092	1,113	1,129	1,234	1,543	1,660	1,829			
Fine Gael	Laurence Blake		1,057	1,092	1,098	1,139	1,154	1,241	1,279	1,299	1,303	1,314	1,316
Independent	Charles Meehan		853	857	868	888	896	913					
Fianna Fáil	Michael Gamble		832	835	844	867	963	968	986				
Independent Fianna Fáil	James Larkin		756	772	777	800	814						
Fianna Fáil	Jackie Harris		447	453	462	486							
Fianna Fáil	Brian Grieve		333	340	342								
Independent	Charles Long		267	274									
Labour	Anne Wilkinson		202										
Electorate: 22,176 Valid: 14,474 (65.37%) Spoilt: 156 Quota: 1,810 Turnout: 14,630

=== Milford ===
Milford: 4 seats
Party	Candidate	FPv%	Count					
Party	Candidate	FPv%	1	2	3	4	5	6
Independent Fianna Fáil	Harry Blaney*		1,547	1,598	1,654	1,829		
Fianna Fáil	Noel McGinley*		1,480	1,538	1,673	1,735	1,749	1,955
Fine Gael	Joachim Loughrey*		1,202	1,217	1,261	1,432	1,445	1,522
Independent Fianna Fáil	Edward O'Donnell		1,202	1,238	1,296	1,434	1,452	1,908
Fine Gael	William McCafferty*		976	987	1,013	1,103	1,109	1,154
Independent Fianna Fáil	Sean McGee		884	960	978	1,010	1,020	
Independent	Elizabeth Grier		827	855	918			
Fianna Fáil	Ronan Sweeney		411	413				
Sinn Féin	Martin Monaghan		309					
Electorate: 11,594 Valid: 8,838 (76.23%) Spoilt: 89 Quota: 1,768 Turnout: 8,927

== Postal vote fraud ==
In late 2015, a previously-sealed National Archives paper revealed a voting fraud scheme occurring just prior to the election. In June 1985, a Garda investigation was launched following the secretary of Donegal County Council reporting irregularities. Of the 3,274 applications made for postal votes in the county, only 634 were considered to be compliant with application procedures. Various irregularities were found including: applications containing dubious signatures, a large numbers of applicants claiming to be employment in professions in far exceeding those known to be present in the area, a difference in ink used between filling out the form and signing, and a number of individuals witnessing multiple applications at the same time and place. While the irregularities occurred in all electoral areas, Glenties and Milford had the most.

When the returning officer for the county council returned certain forms requesting clarification he reported that some individuals stated they had no memory of making applications, others had returned their forms with a different professions to that state on the initial form, and many denied witnessing the signatures they were supposedly present for.

In one such case a member of the council approached a house from which a number of applications had supposedly came from, only to discover the house was occupied by students with no knowledge of the applications. The students did state however that they been approached by an unidentified male who advised they claim they had made the applications and that any voting cards issued to the house would be collected later. In another case, one person apparently presented nine different applications for approval.

The voting fraud scheme appeared to have been a failure, since only fully compliant applications were issued with voting cards. A government memo stated that the Gardaí intended to investigate the other 2,640 suspicious applications.
