= 1960 Donegal County Council election =

1960 Irish local government election

← 1955	30 June 1960	1967 →

All 28 seats on Donegal County Council
	First party	Second party	Third party
Party	Fianna Fáil	Fine Gael	Sinn Féin
Seats won	13	8	1
Seat change	▼1	▼2	New
	Fourth party	Fifth party
Party	Ratepayers	Independent
Seats won	1	5
Seat change	New	▲1
- Map showing the area of Donegal County Council
Council control before election
Fianna Fáil
Council control after election
Fianna Fáil

An election to all 28 seats on Donegal County Council took place on 30 June 1960 as part of the Irish local elections. Councillors were elected from five local electoral areas for a five-year term of office on the electoral system of proportional representation by means of the single transferable vote (PR-STV).

== Results by party ==
Party	Seats	1st pref	FPv%
Fianna Fáil	13	17,281	41.07%
Fine Gael	8	12,614	29.98%
Sinn Féin	1	1,741	4.14%
Labour	0	240	0.57%
Independent	6	10,202	24.16%
Total	28	42,076	100.00%

== Results by local electoral area ==
- Sitting in italics

=== Buncrana ===
Buncrana: 6 seats
Party	Candidate	FPv%	Count				
Party	Candidate	FPv%	1	2	3	4	5
Fianna Fáil	Liam Cunningham*	18.9%	1,499				
Fianna Fáil	Alex Diver*	15.6%	1,238				
Fianna Fáil	Michael Deery*	14.4%	1,142				
Fine Gael	James McEleney*	10.5%	835	851	885	888	1,199
Fianna Fáil	Robert Doherty	10.1%	801	909	927	996	1,030
Fine Gael	James J. McGettigan	9.5%	749	757	766	790	—
Fine Gael	James Deeney*	8.7%	692	726	902	907	941
Fianna Fáil	Sean McLaughlin*	7.2%	574	762	837	841	860
Independent	Alfred Bateman	4.9%	389	409	—		
Electorate: 15,558 Valid: 7,927 Quota: 1,133 Turnout: 8,027

=== Donegal ===
Donegal: 6 seats
Party	Candidate	FPv%	Count										
Party	Candidate	FPv%	1	2	3	4	5	6	7	8	9	10	11
Fine Gael	Christy Gallagher	10.0%	1,004	1,009	1,012	1,017	1,084	1,101	1,110	1,116	1,247	1,328	
Fine Gael	Michael Melly*	8.9%	889	909	932	1,019	1,021	1,027	1,051	1,136	1,147	'1,328	
Fianna Fáil	Frank Muldoon*	8.8%	882	890	911	915	927	935	974	1,211	1,225	1,281	1,392
Independent	Brian McRory	8.5%	848	857	858	860	879	892	1,064	1,067	1,090	1,106	1,156
Fianna Fáil	Michael O'Donnell	8.3%	831	833	839	842	842	895	919	946	1,033	1,046	1,387
Independent	Robert Anderson*	8.2%	826	831	835	842	980	983	995	1,006	1,008	1,039	1,052
Fianna Fáil	James Callaghan	8.0%	798	798	798	799	801	819	844	857	885	897	—
Independent	Joseph Doherty	7.0%	704	711	729	778	779	782	802	842	842	—	
Fine Gael	Seamus McShane	6.3%	627	631	634	636	642	672	695	702	918	923	1,022
Sinn Féin	Eamonn Monaghan	4.7%	469	477	478	482	488	501	—				
Fine Gael	Patrick Cunningham*	4.4%	441	445	446	447	449	674	699	699	—		
Fianna Fáil	Alex McKeaney	4.4%	440	446	549	574	579	582	582	—			
Fine Gael	Hugh Gallagher	4.2%	425	428	432	432	444	—					
Independent	Albert Ellis	3.1%	311	312	312	312	—						
Independent	Edward Doherty	2.2%	218	220	239	—							
Fianna Fáil	Anthony King	2.1%	214	220	—								
Independent	Bernard Mangan	1.1%	112	—									
Valid: 10,039 Spoilt: 130 Quota: 1,435 Turnout: 10,169

=== Glenties ===
Glenties: 6 seats
Party	Candidate	FPv%	Count			
Party	Candidate	FPv%	1	2	3	4
Fine Gael	Patrick O'Donnell*	19.1%	1,490			
Fianna Fáil	Louis Walsh*	17.8%	1,393			
Fianna Fáil	Cormac Breslin*	15.4%	1,202			
Fine Gael	Charles Greene*	14.4%	1,126			
Sinn Féin	Seamus Rogers	12.3%	961	1,082	1,103	1,118
Fianna Fáil	Sean O'Cinneide*	10.3%	803	871	878	1,105
Fine Gael	Charles McDyre	9.3%	727	902	915	949
Independent	Patrick A. McCarthy	8.7%	116	125	—	
Valid: 7,818 Spoilt: 84 Quota: 1,117 Turnout: 7,902

=== Letterkenny ===
Letterkenny: 6 seats
Party	Candidate	FPv%	Count									
Party	Candidate	FPv%	1	2	3	4	5	6	7	8	9	10
Independent	William Buchanan*	16.7%	1,899									
Fine Gael	Paddy Harte TD	11.0%	1,249	1,251	1,254	1,260	1,342	1,353	1,440	1,690		
Independent	Peter Dunnion*	10.2%	1,166	1,168	1,178	1,196	1,231	1,235	1,290	1,358	1,362	1,495
Fianna Fáil	Paddy McGowan	8.9%	1,019	1,022	1,028	1,034	1,101	1,133	1,169	1,209	1,211	1,243
Fianna Fáil	Bernard McGlinchey	8.1%	924	924	951	981	1,161	1,311	1,347	1,394	1,395	1,528
Independent	Samuel Patterson*	7.7%	880	1,117	1,132	1,137	1,142	1,205	1,220	1,248	1,250	1,290
Independent	Charles O'Donnell*	6.5%	741	742	779	811	824	895	948	967	967	—
Fine Gael	Hugh McKendrick*	6.2%	710	711	759	811	824	895	948	967	1,012	1,226
Fine Gael	John F. Hunter*	6.0%	684	694	697	709	722	725	790	—		
Fianna Fáil	John J. Sheridan	4.9%	555	560	569	576	596	—				
Ind. Republican	Frank Morris	4.9%	554	556	572	626	644	648	—			
Fianna Fáil	Charles Doherty	4.2%	475	478	481	511	—					
Sinn Féin	Patrick J. Dawson	2.7%	311	314	332	—						
Labour	John Nugent	2.1%	240	240	—							
Valid: 11,407 Spoilt: 144 Quota: 1,630 Turnout: 11,551

=== Milford ===
Milford: 4 seats
Party	Candidate	FPv%	Count					
Party	Candidate	FPv%	1	2	3	4	5	6
Fianna Fáil	Harry Blaney*	31.4%	1,533					
Independent	Samuel Baxter*	17.1%	834	863	867	893	917	1,006
Fine Gael	Patrick Kelly*	13.3%	650	680	687	740	911	976
Fianna Fáil	John Harkin*	11.8%	577	747	749	765	813	871
Independent	Charles Harley	7.7%	378	394	411	422	443	—
Fianna Fáil	Michael Byrne	7.6%	371	656	660	664	674	717
Fine Gael	Maurice Ferry	6.5%	316	330	335	345	—	
Independent	William McGrory	3.7%	181	188	191	—		
Independent	Edward Helferly	0.9%	45	49	—			
Valid: 4,885 Spoilt: 114 Quota: 978 Turnout: 4,999
