= 1967 Donegal County Council election =

1967 Irish local government election

← 1960	28 June 1967	1974 →

All 28 seats on Donegal County Council
	First party	Second party	Third party
Party	Fianna Fáil	Fine Gael	Donegal Progressive Party
Seats won	15	11	1
Seat change	▲2	▲3	New
	Fourth party	Fifth party
Party	Sinn Féin	Independent
Seats won	1	0
Seat change	Steady	▼2
- Map showing the area of Donegal County Council
Council control before election
Fianna Fáil
Council control after election
Fianna Fáil

An election to all 28 seats on Donegal County Council took place on 28 June 1967 as part of the Irish local elections. Councillors were elected from five local electoral areas for a five-year term of office on the electoral system of proportional representation by means of the single transferable vote (PR-STV).

The election was originally planned for 1965, but had been delayed twice before eventually going forward in 1967.

== Results by party ==
Party	Seats	1st pref	FPv%
Fianna Fáil	15	24,250	47.94%
Fine Gael	11	17,307	34.21%
Donegal Progressive Party	1	4,520	3.14%
Sinn Féin	1	620	1.23%
Labour	0	981	1.94%
Independent	0	1,477	2.92%
Total	28	50,584	100.00%

== Results by local electoral area ==
- Sitting in italics

=== Buncrana ===
Buncrana: 6 seats
Party	Candidate	FPv%	Count						
Party	Candidate	FPv%	1	2	3	4	5	6	7
Fianna Fáil	Liam Cunningham*	19.6%	2,097						
Fine Gael	Bertie Boggs	15.9%	1,661						
Fine Gael	Sean McLaughlin*	11.3%	1,206	1,234	1,249	1,254	1,254	1,769	
Fianna Fáil	Alex Diver*	10.5%	1,126	1,209	1,213	1,421	1,482	1,499	1,505
Fianna Fáil	Michael Deery*	10.4%	1,112	1,258	1,273	1,641			
Fine Gael	Eamonn Gillen	9.1%	970	982	1,026	1,038	1,040	1,175	1,397
Fianna Fáil	James Grant	8.4%	900	1,152	1,154	1,209	1,253	1,269	1,278
Fine Gael	James McEleney	8.2%	883	893	938	970	972	—	
Fianna Fáil	Robert Doherty	7.1%	762	796	800	—			
Valid: 10,717 Quota: 1,650 Turnout: 10,884

=== Donegal ===
Donegal: 6 seats
Party	Candidate	FPv%	Count									
Party	Candidate	FPv%	1	2	3	4	5	6	7	8	9	10
Fine Gael	Michael Melly*	10.2%	1,113	1,114	1,210	1,323	1,336	1,339	1,371	1,376	1,583	
Fine Gael	Colm Gallagher	10.2%	1,110	1,148	1,161	1,255	1,370	1,382	1,582			
Donegal Progressive Party	Robert Anderson*	10.1%	1,094	1,097	1,103	1,133	1,138	1,139	1,203	1,207	1,233	1,242
Fianna Fáil	Christy Meehan*	9.2%	995	1,011	1,017	1,037	1,191	1,219	1,232	1,236	1,335	1,340
Fianna Fáil	Brendan Murrin	8.4%	918	926	927	937	1,105	1,497	1,699			
Fine Gael	Francis Cunningham	8.1%	880	884	893	907	911	1,095	1,317	1,357	1,361	1,363
Fianna Fáil	Sean McEniff	7.9%	863	864	921	948	963	972	974	976	1,286	1,299
Fine Gael	Thomas Murphy	7.3%	793	804	809	815	849	869	—			
Fianna Fáil	Michael O'Donnell	7.0%	758	759	764	770	810	—				
Fianna Fáil	James Quinn	6.6%	712	715	736	815	841	873	877	879	—	
Fianna Fáil	Edward Quinn	6.0%	648	689	703	746	—					
Independent	Seamus Cleary	4.0%	432	490	522	—						
Sinn Féin	Joe O'Neill	2.7%	296	365	—							
Sinn Féin	Eamonn Monaghan	2.1%	233	—								
Electorate: 14,429 Valid: 10,876 Spoilt: 132 Quota: 1,554 Turnout: 11,008 (76.29%)

=== Glenties ===
Glenties: 6 seats
Party	Candidate	FPv%	Count						
Party	Candidate	FPv%	1	2	3	4	5	6	7
Fine Gael	Patrick O'Donnell*	15.2%	1,449						
Sinn Féin	Seamus Rogers*	14.9%	1,418						
Fianna Fáil	Cormac Breslin*	14.6%	1,394						
Fianna Fáil	John Kelly	10.0%	956	958	964	978	986	1,032	1,233
Fine Gael	James Gallagher	9.2%	874	906	911	911	947	1,052	1,065
Fine Gael	James Doohan	8.7%	825	833	838	838	1,133	1,140	1,144
Fianna Fáil	Joseph Campbell	8.1%	775	777	784	791	797	1,184	1,416
Fianna Fáil	Niall McCole	7.3%	695	709	731	738	743	768	—
Fianna Fáil	James Gavigan	7.1%	674	675	678	679	685	—	
Fine Gael	Thomas Coll	4.9%	469	497	505	508	—		
Electorate: 15,945 Valid: 9,529 Spoilt: 142 Quota: 362 Turnout: 9,671 (60.65%)

=== Letterkenny ===
Letterkenny: 6 seats
Party	Candidate	FPv%	Count									
Party	Candidate	FPv%	1	2	3	4	5	6	7	8	9	10
Fianna Fáil	Paddy McGowan*	15.4%	2,026									
Fine Gael	Paddy Harte TD*	12.8%	1,685	1,688	1,710	1,734	1,761	2,031				
Donegal Progressive Party	Winston Patterson	11.8%	1,548	1,549	1,552	1,564	1,579	1,593	1,595	1,642	1,657	1,661
Fianna Fáil	Bernard McGlinchey*	11.8%	1,547	1,595	1,703	1,749	1,824	1,867	1,876	2,051		
Donegal Progressive Party	William Buchanan*	9.7%	1,271	1,272	1,276	1,281	1,284	1,288	1,289	1,305	1,334	1,335
Fianna Fáil	Patrick Friel	9.0%	1,183	1,238	1,342	1,347	1,431	1,447	1,448	1,499	1,616	1,648
Fine Gael	J.J. Reid	7.4%	970	979	985	994	1,056	1,147	1,275	1,345	1,458	1,471
Independent	Charles O'Donnell	5.0%	652	654	666	698	723	775	783	—		
Labour	George Hunter	4.5%	586	589	612	792	805	820	824	860	—	
Fine Gael	Hugh McKendrick	3.8%	501	503	529	556	576	—				
Labour	Colum O'Donnell	3.0%	395	395	407	—						
Independent	Peter Dunnion	3.0%	393	411	419	423	—					
Fianna Fáil	Michael Grant	2.2%	291	296	—							
Sinn Féin	Edward McGarrigle	4.5%	91	92	—							
Valid: 13,119 Spoilt: 240 Quota: 1,878 Turnout: 13,359

=== Milford ===
Milford: 4 seats
Party	Candidate	FPv%	Count					
Party	Candidate	FPv%	1	2	3	4	5	6
Fianna Fáil	Harry Blaney*	11.3%	1,476					
Fianna Fáil	John Harkin*	9.9%	1,293					
Fine Gael	William McCafferty	7.1%	928	937	939	1,045	1,123	1,284
Donegal Progressive Party	Robert Baxter*	4.6%	607	618	620	653	674	—
Fianna Fáil	William McNutt	4.1%	532	577	585	664	999	1,076
Fianna Fáil	Edward Fries	3.9%	517	637	646	652	—	
Fine Gael	Frank Hannigan	3.9%	514	531	533	711	726	853
Fine Gael	Joseph Gallagher	3.6%	476	481	482	—		
Valid: 6,343 Spoilt: 144 Quota: 1,269 Turnout: 6,487
