= 1979 Donegal County Council election =

Part of the 1979 Irish local elections

- 7 June 1979

All 28 seats on Donegal County Council
	First party	Second party	Third party
Party	Fianna Fáil	Fine Gael	Independent Fianna Fáil
Seats won	11	10	4
Seat change	Steady	Steady	Steady
	Fourth party	Fifth party	Sixth party
Party	Sinn Féin	Sinn Féin The Workers' Party	Donegal Progressive Party
Seats won	1	1	1
Seat change	▲1	Steady	Steady
- Map showing the area of Donegal County Council
Council control before election
Fianna Fáil
Council control after election
Fianna Fáil

An election to all 28 seats on Donegal County Council took place on 7 June 1979 as part of the 1979 Irish local elections. County Donegal was divided into five county local electoral areas to elect councillors for a five-year term of office on the electoral system of proportional representation by means of the single transferable vote (PR-STV). This term was extended for a further year, to 1985.

== Results by party ==
Party	Seats	±	1st pref	FPv%	±
Fianna Fáil	11	Steady	24,516	40.08%	▲4.44%
Fine Gael	10	Steady	18,260	29.85%	▼4.56%
Independent Fianna Fáil	4	Steady	10,245	16.75%	▲5.68%
Sinn Féin	1	▲1	3,055	5.00%	▲3.16%
Sinn Féin The Workers' Party	1	Steady	2,195	3.59%	▼0.34%
Donegal Progressive Party	1	Steady	1,728	2.82%	▼0.32%
Independent	0	▼2	1,167	1.91%	▼7.61%
Total	28	Steady	61,166	100.00%	

== Results by local electoral area ==
*: Incumbent councillor.

=== Buncrana ===
Buncrana: 6 seats
Party	Candidate	FPv%	Count										
Party	Candidate	FPv%	1	2	3	4	5	6	7	8	9	10	11
Fianna Fáil	Hugh Conaghan TD	14.1%	1,868										
Sinn Féin	Eddie Fullerton	10.1%	1,331	1,355	1,369	1,424	1,428	1,434	1,443	1,445	1,478	1,491	1,614
Fianna Fáil	Conal Doogan	9.6%	1,267	1,271	1,276	1,430	1,582	1,592	1,600	1,604	2,248		
Fine Gael	Sean McLaughlin	8.9%	1,176	1,187	1,201	1,225	1,231	1,331	1,444	1,444	1,451	1,452	1,931'
Fine Gael	Bernard McGuinness	7.6%	1,005	1,008	1,012	1,020	1,033	1,097	1,417	1,417	1,507	1,532	1,832
Independent Fianna Fáil	Michael Deery	7.6%	1,001	1,018	1,064	1,075	1,088	1,093	1,111	1,113	1,243	1,316	1,344
Independent Fianna Fáil	Paddy Keaveney	6.8%	896	909	994	1,011	1,133	1,142	1,361	1,366	1,393	1,403	1,441
Fianna Fáil	Denis McGonagle	6.7%	885	889	892	924	1,098	1,100	1,110	1,110	—		
Fine Gael	Harry Gillen	6.0%	798	804	804	806	854	1,035	—				
Fine Gael	Seamus Gill	5.9%	780	794	800	835	840	1,060	1,220	1,221	1,234	1,236	—
Fine Gael	Jim Devenney	5.2%	693	693	718	722	724	—					
Fianna Fáil	Sean McBride	4.6%	609	611	613	650	—						
Fianna Fáil	Karl Deery	3.4%	445	460	463	—							
Independent Fianna Fáil	Sean McDaid	2.2%	293	325	—								
Independent Fianna Fáil	Mick Gallagher	1.2%	154	—									
Independent	Patrick Kelly	0.2%	27	—									
Electorate: 17,987 Valid: 13,030 (98.5%) Spoilt: 198 Quota: 1,890 Turnout: 13,228 (73.54%)

=== Donegal ===
Donegal: 6 seats
Party	Candidate	FPv%	Count								
Party	Candidate	FPv%	1	2	3	4	5	6	7	8	9
Fianna Fáil	Clement Coughlan	22.3%	2,869								
Fine Gael	Michael Melly	12.8%	1,649	1,671	1,682	1,684	1,689	1,702	1,711	1,759	1,773
Sinn Féin	Joe O'Neill	9.6%	1,241	1,285	1,324	1,337	1,384	1,440	1,470	1,491	1,552
Fianna Fáil	Brian McEniff	9.5%	1,220	1,341	1,348	1,350	1,357	1,373	1,402	1,412	1,602
Fine Gael	Colm Gallagher	8.8%	1,140	1,312	1,312	1,316	1,391	1,488	1,503	1,562	1,591
Fianna Fáil	Brian Gallagher	7.4%	957	1,175	1,177	1,186	1,220	1,402	1,472	1,487	1,678
Fianna Fáil	James McBrearty	6.3%	809	960	961	1,003	1,020	1,032	1,226	1,395	—
Fine Gael	Sean McNialluis	5.6%	728	731	732	779	785	786	816	—	
Fine Gael	Thomas Murphy	5.6%	718	785	786	794	821	827	993	1,407	1,576
Fianna Fáil	Patrick McGinley	4.5%	579	651	651	667	701	703	—		
Independent Fianna Fáil	Hugh Cassidy	3.1%	401	477	490	501	584	—			
Independent Fianna Fáil	John Murray	2.3%	292	371	384	389	—				
Sinn Féin The Workers' Party	Michael Byrne	1.5%	192	194	195	—					
Independent Fianna Fáil	Val Wynne	0.7%	96	96	—						
Electorate: 16,519 Valid: 12,891 Quota: 1,842

=== Glenties ===
Glenties: 6 seats
Party	Candidate	FPv%	Count						
Party	Candidate	FPv%	1	2	3	4	5	6	7
Fianna Fáil	Paddy Delap	20.6%	'2,391						
Sinn Féin The Workers' Party	Seamus Rogers	13.1%	1,519	1,599	1,653	1,736			
Fianna Fáil	Pat The Cope Gallagher	12.1%	1,411	1,632	1,649	1,663			
Fianna Fáil	Sean McNelis	9.9%	1,149	1,306	1,310	1,469	1,495	1,506	1,524
Independent Fianna Fáil	John Kelly	9.3%	1,084	1,128	1,141	1,241	1,247	1,256	1,576
Fine Gael	Pat Slowey	8.5%	992	995	997	1,104	1,121	1,182	1,220
Fine Gael	James Doohan	7.1%	822	866	873	877	882	938	—
Fine Gael	Jim Coyle	6.9%	800	832	841	842	843	—	
Fine Gael	Fred Coll	6.4%	746	859	899	903	903	1,285	1,581
Fianna Fáil	John McLoone	4.4%	514	519	526	—			
Sinn Féin	Donal De Barra	1.7%	198	229	—				
Electorate: 16,684 Valid: 11,626 (98.65%) Spoilt: 159 Quota: 1,661 Turnout: 11,785 (70.64%)

=== Letterkenny ===
Letterkenny: 6 seats
Party	Candidate	FPv%	Count									
Party	Candidate	FPv%	1	2	3	4	5	6	7	8	9	10
Fine Gael	Paddy Harte TD	13.9%	2,046	2,073	2,124							
Fianna Fáil	Paddy McGowan	13.8%	2,033	2,086	2,094	2,099	2,209					
Fianna Fáil	Bernard McGlinchey	12.7%	1,868	1,888	2,064	2,163						
Donegal Progressive Party	William Buchanan	11.7%	1,728	1,745	1,749	1,846	1,864	1,864	1,865	1,866	1,909	1,929
Fine Gael	J.J. Reid	8.0%	1,188	1,256	1,271	1,499	1,562	1,567	1,571	1,578	1,626	1,697
Independent Fianna Fáil	Charles O'Donnell	7.5%	1,106	1,118	1,173	1,220	1,260	1,263	1,280	1,284	1,339	1,425
Independent Fianna Fáil	Susan McGonagle	6.6%	979	1,065	1,104	1,117	1,162	1,167	1,171	1,171	1,211	1,616
Fianna Fáil	Joseph Peoples	5.5%	817	820	835	850	911	928	942	942	—	
Independent Fianna Fáil	Gabriel Gordon	5.5%	812	848	872	876	934	946	952	954	975	—
Independent	Billy Gallagher	4.7%	695	704	737	753	—					
Fine Gael	May McClintock	3.8%	562	572	610	—						
Sinn Féin The Workers' Party	Sean O'Donnell	3.3%	484	501	—							
Independent	Charles Long	3.0%	445	—								
Electorate: 20,479 Valid: 14,763 (98.16%) Spoilt: 277 Quota: 2,110 Turnout: 15,040 (73.44%)

=== Milford ===
Milford: 4 seats
Party	Candidate	FPv%	Count					
Party	Candidate	FPv%	1	2	3	4	5	6
Independent Fianna Fáil	Harry Blaney	20.8%	1,805					
Fianna Fáil	Noel McGinley	17.8%	1,545	1,547	1,610	1,690	1,783	
Fine Gael	William McCafferty	14.6%	1,262	1,265	1,284	1,344	1,376	1,515
Fine Gael	Joachim Loughrey	13.3%	1,155	1,167	1,182	1,266	1,290	1,425
Independent Fianna Fáil	Rosemary McCafferty	10.2%	882	919	972	1,004	1,286	1,368
Fianna Fáil	Ian McGarvey	9.2%	797	800	808	960	969	—
Fianna Fáil	William Friel	5.6%	483	490	503	—		
Independent Fianna Fáil	Hugh McClafferty	5.1%	444	450	514	537	—	
Sinn Féin	Pat Doherty	3.3%	285	288	—			
Electorate: 10,790 Valid: 8,658 (98.04%) Spoilt: 173 Quota: 1,732 Turnout: 8,831 (84.81%)
