= 1974 Irish local elections =

Nationwide local authority elections

← 1967	18 June 1974	1979 →
- Turnout: 62.13%
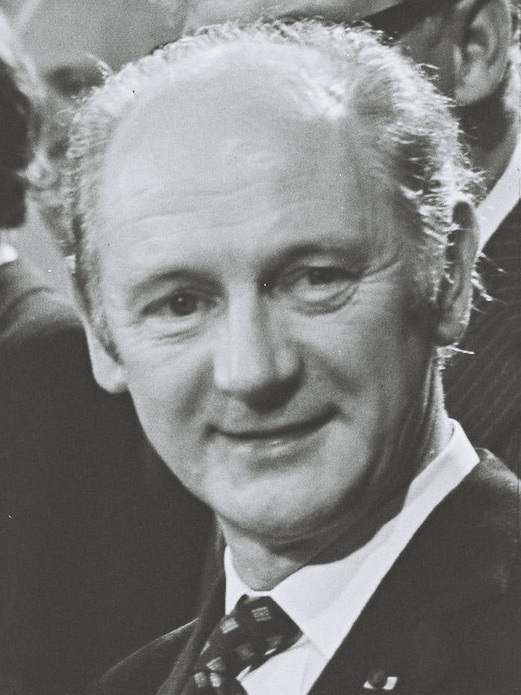

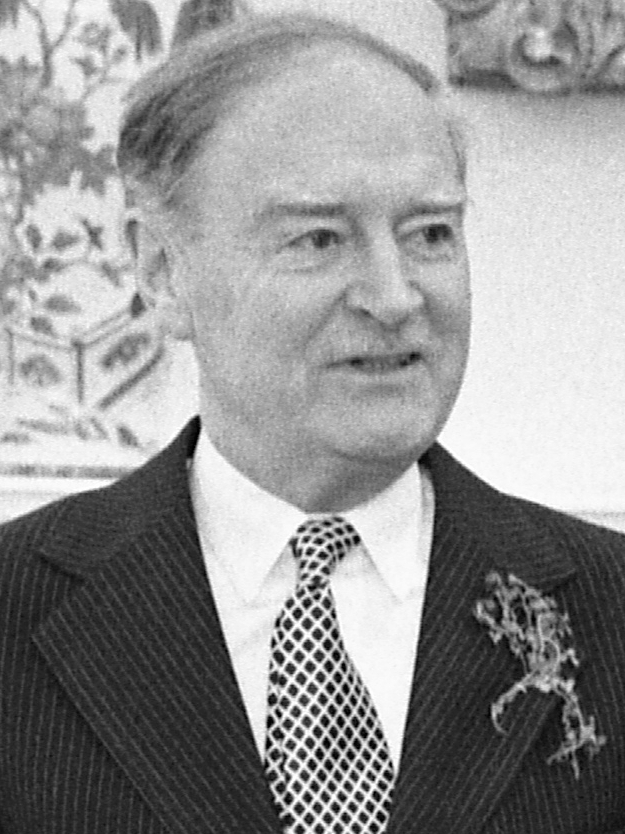

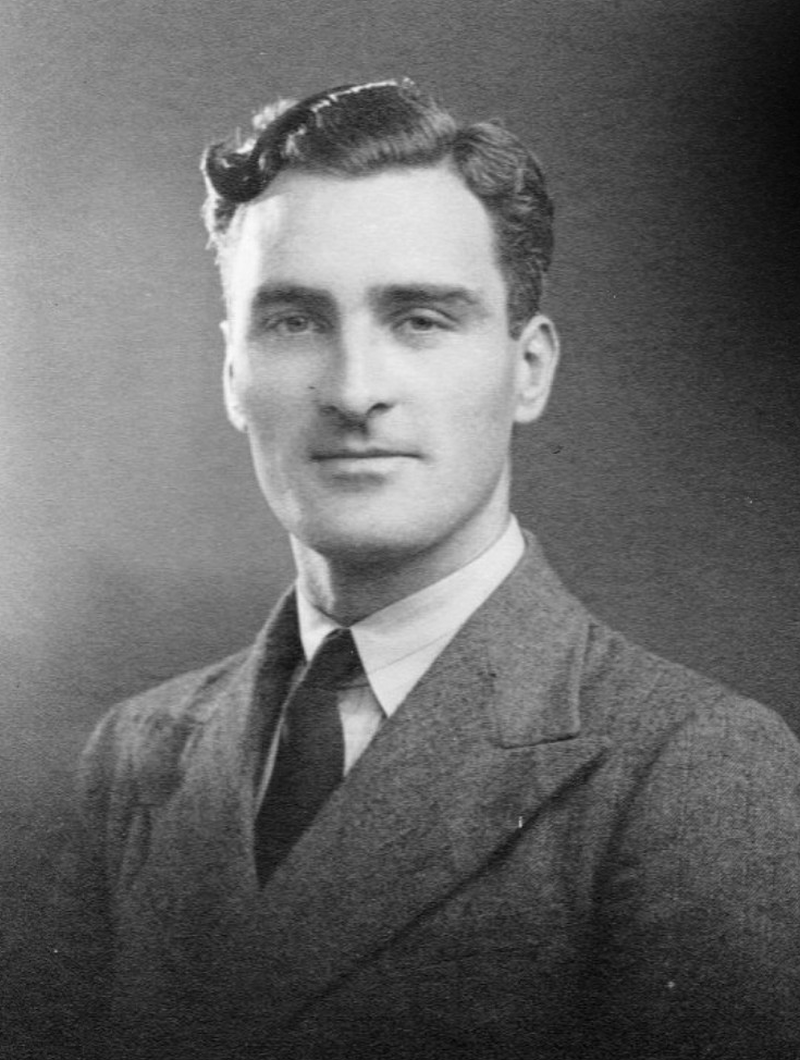

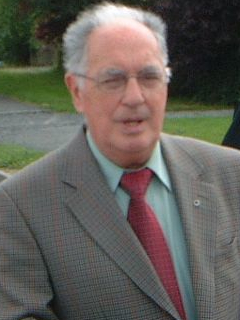

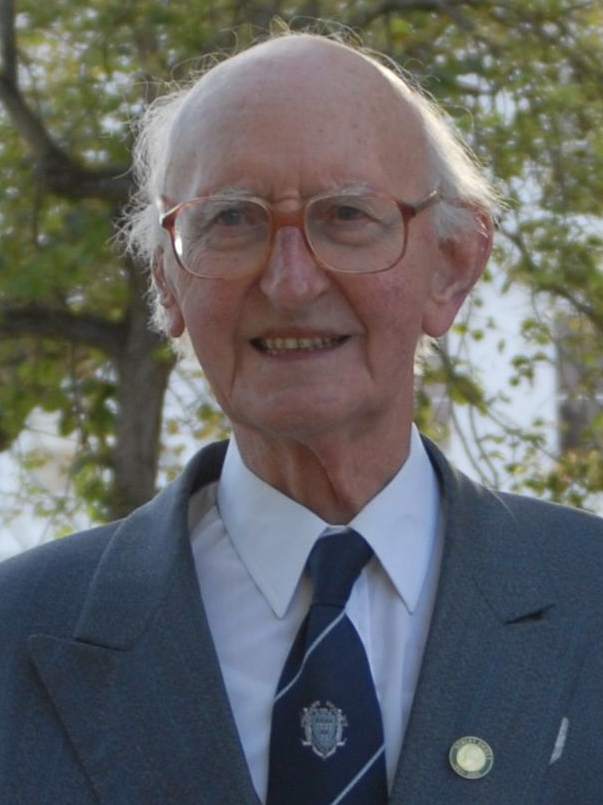

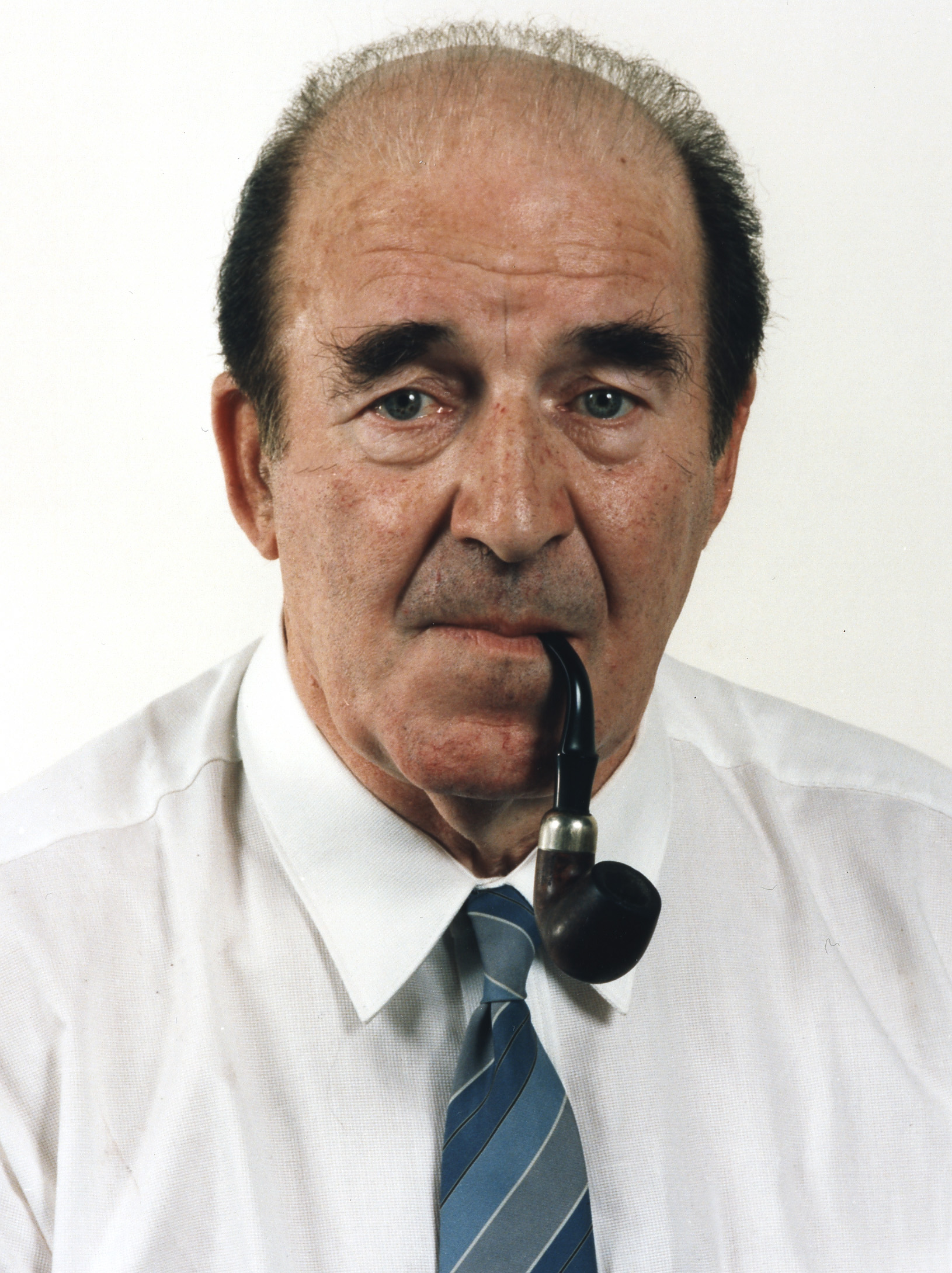
	First party	Second party	Third party
Leader	Jack Lynch	Liam Cosgrave	Brendan Corish
Party	Fianna Fáil	Fine Gael	Labour
Alliance		National Coalition	National Coalition
Leader since	9 November 1966	21 April 1965	2 March 1960
Seats won	352	280	79
Seat change	▲91	▲49	▲20
Popular vote	494,926	417,854	158,444
Percentage	39.8%	33.6%	12.8%
Swing	▲0.3%	▼0.1%	▼1.2%
	Fourth party	Fifth party	Sixth party
Leader	Ruairí Ó Brádaigh	Tomás Mac Giolla	Neil Blaney
Party	Sinn Féin (Provisional)	Sinn Féin (Official)	Independent Fianna Fáil
Leader since	October 1970	14 October 1962	1972
Seats won	7	6	4
Seat change	New	New	New
Popular vote	22,543	16,623	7,240
Percentage	1.8%	1.3%	0.8%
Swing	New	New	New

The 1974 Irish local elections were held in counties, cities and towns of Ireland to elect the councils of all local authorities in the country on Tuesday, 18 June 1974.

== Results ==
=== Total seats ===
Party	Seats	±	1st pref	FPv%	±%
Fianna Fáil	352	▲91	494,926	39.8	+0.3
Fine Gael	280	▲49	417,854	33.6	−0.1
Labour	79	▲20	158,444	12.8	−1.2
Sinn Féin (Provisional)	7	New	22,543	1.8	New
Sinn Féin (Official)	6	New	16,623	1.3	New
Independent Fianna Fáil	4	New	7240	0.6	New
Protestant Association	2	▼1	2,313	0.2	−0.1
Clann na Poblachta (Note: "Clann na Poblachta" officially dissolved in 1965; however, local election candidates continued to use the name of the party until the 1974 local elections.)	1	▼1	1,082	0.1	−0.2
Independent	74	▲30	118,242	9.5	+1.1
Total			1,421,494	100.0	—

=== County councils ===
Authority	FF	FG	Lab	SF (P)	SF (O)	Other	Total
Carlow	9	7	3			2	21
Cavan	12	10			1	2	25
Clare	19	7	2	1		2	31
Cork County	20	17	6		1	2	46
Donegal	7	11			1	4 (Note: The Donegal non-party councillors were members of Independent Fianna Fáil.)	23
Dublin	10	8	5			2	25
Galway County	16	9	1	2		3	31
Kerry	13	7	3		1	2	26
Kildare	10	7	3			1	21
Kilkenny	13	11	2				26
Laois	11	12	2				25
Leitrim	8	12		1		1	22
Limerick County	14	11	2				27
Longford	7	8		1		5	21
Louth	11	11	1	1	1	1	26
Mayo	17	11				3	31
Meath	14	8	5			2	29
Monaghan	7	8		1		2 (Note: The non-party Monaghan councillors were nominated by the Protestant Association.)	20
Offaly	8	9	2			1	20
Roscommon	12	12				2	26
Sligo	9	12	1			2	24
Tipperary North	8	6	3			3	20
Tipperary South	11	10	4			1	26
Waterford County	13	6	2			2	21
Westmeath	11	6	2			4	23
Wexford	9	6	3		1	2	21
Wicklow	9	6	3			2	20

=== County borough corporations ===
Authority	FF	FG	Lab	SF (P)	SF (O)	Other	Total
Cork Corporation	16	11	2			2	31
Dublin Corporation	15	13	10			7 (Note: Six of the seven non-party members of Dublin Corporation were elected as Community candidates, including Seán Dublin Bay Loftus and Carmencita Hederman.)	45
Limerick Corporation	5	5	5			2	17
Waterford Corporation	6	3	2		1	3	15

=== Borough corporations ===
Authority	FF	FG	Lab	SF (P)	SF (O)	Other	Total
Dún Laoghaire Corporation	2	8	5				15
Galway Corporation	4	1	2			5	12
Kilkenny Corporation	3	3	4			2	12
Sligo Corporation	3	3	1			5	12
Wexford Corporation	3	2	4			3	12
