= Poblacht =

Poblacht is the Irish word for "republic". It may refer to:

- An Phoblacht (English: The Republic), a newspaper published by Sinn Féin
- Poblacht na hÉireann (disambiguation), can be rendered in English Irish Republic or Republic of Ireland. It can refer to:
  - The revolutionary Irish Republic proclaimed in 1916 and 1919, also termed Saorstát Éireann
  - Poblacht na hÉireann, a newspaper first published in 1922 in Ireland by republican opponents of the Anglo-Irish Treaty
  - The Republic of Ireland, the legal description of the modern Irish state since 1949 (though not its official name)
- Proclamation of the Irish Republic (Irish: Forógra na Poblachta), a 1916 document declaring the independence of the Irish Republic from the United Kingdom
- Poblacht Chríostúil (English: Christian Republic), a small political party in Cork in the mid-1960s

== See also ==
- Names of the Irish state
- List of Irish exonyms
