= 1979 Irish local elections =

Nationwide local authority elections

← 1974	7 June 1979	1985 →
- Turnout: 63.60% ▲1.47pp
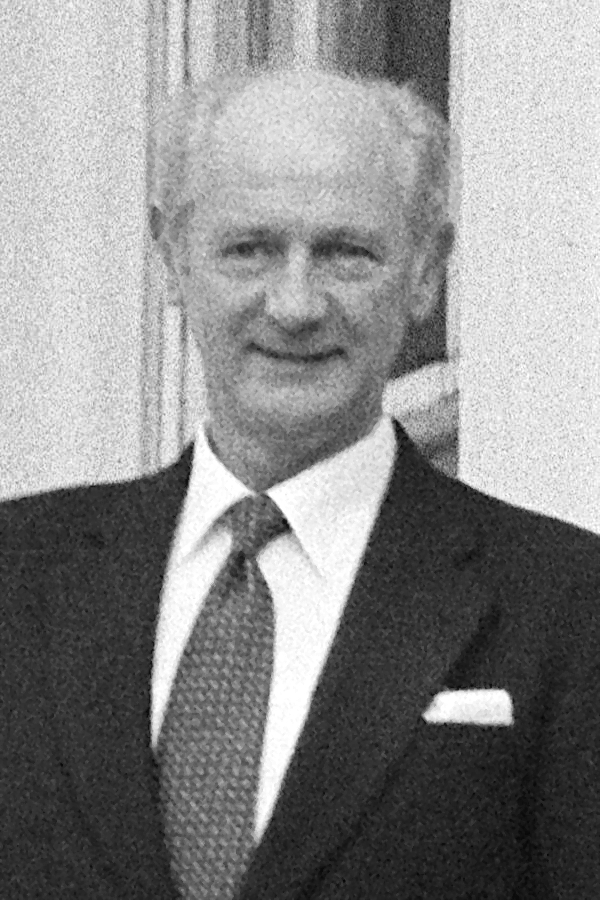

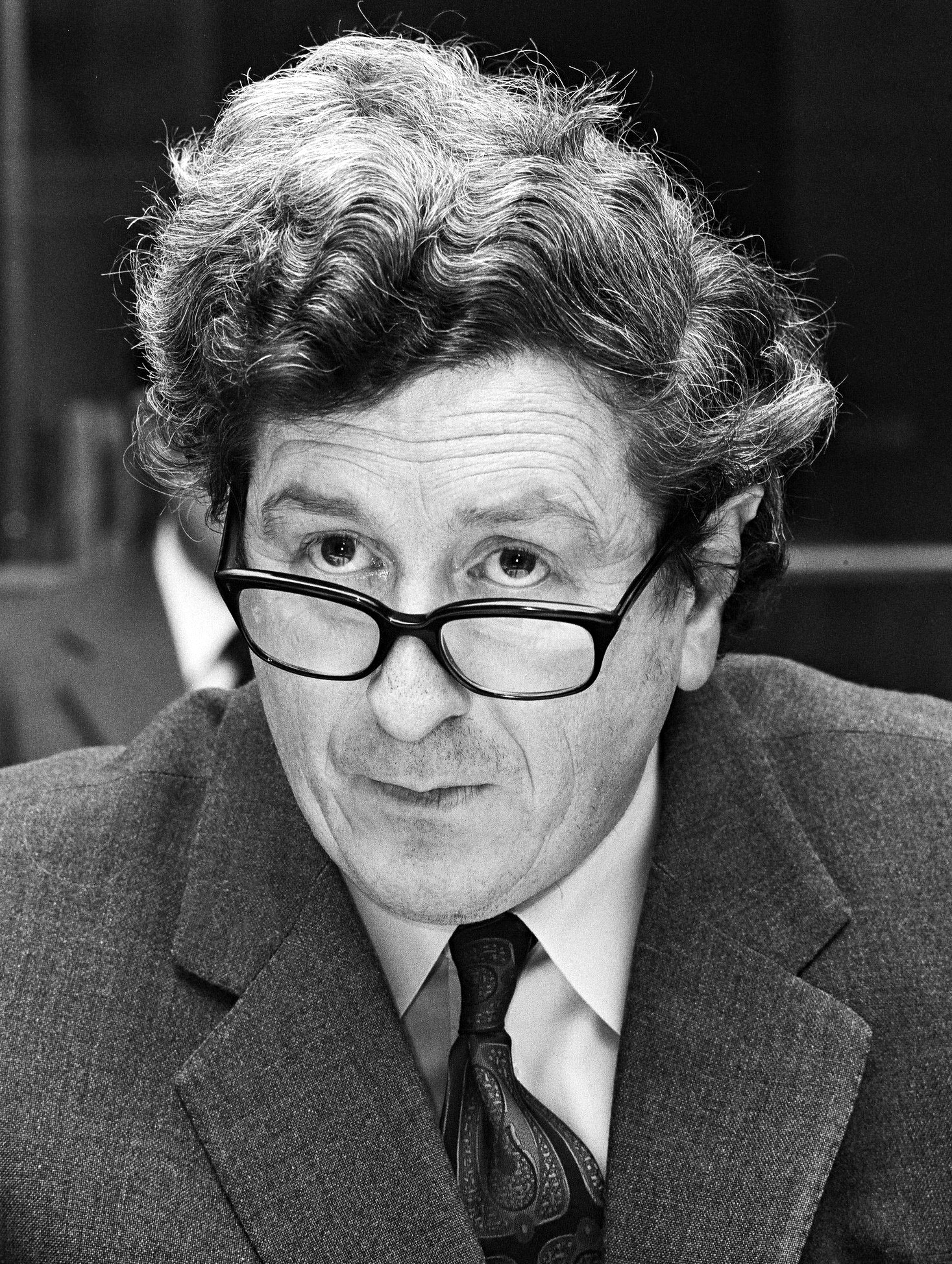

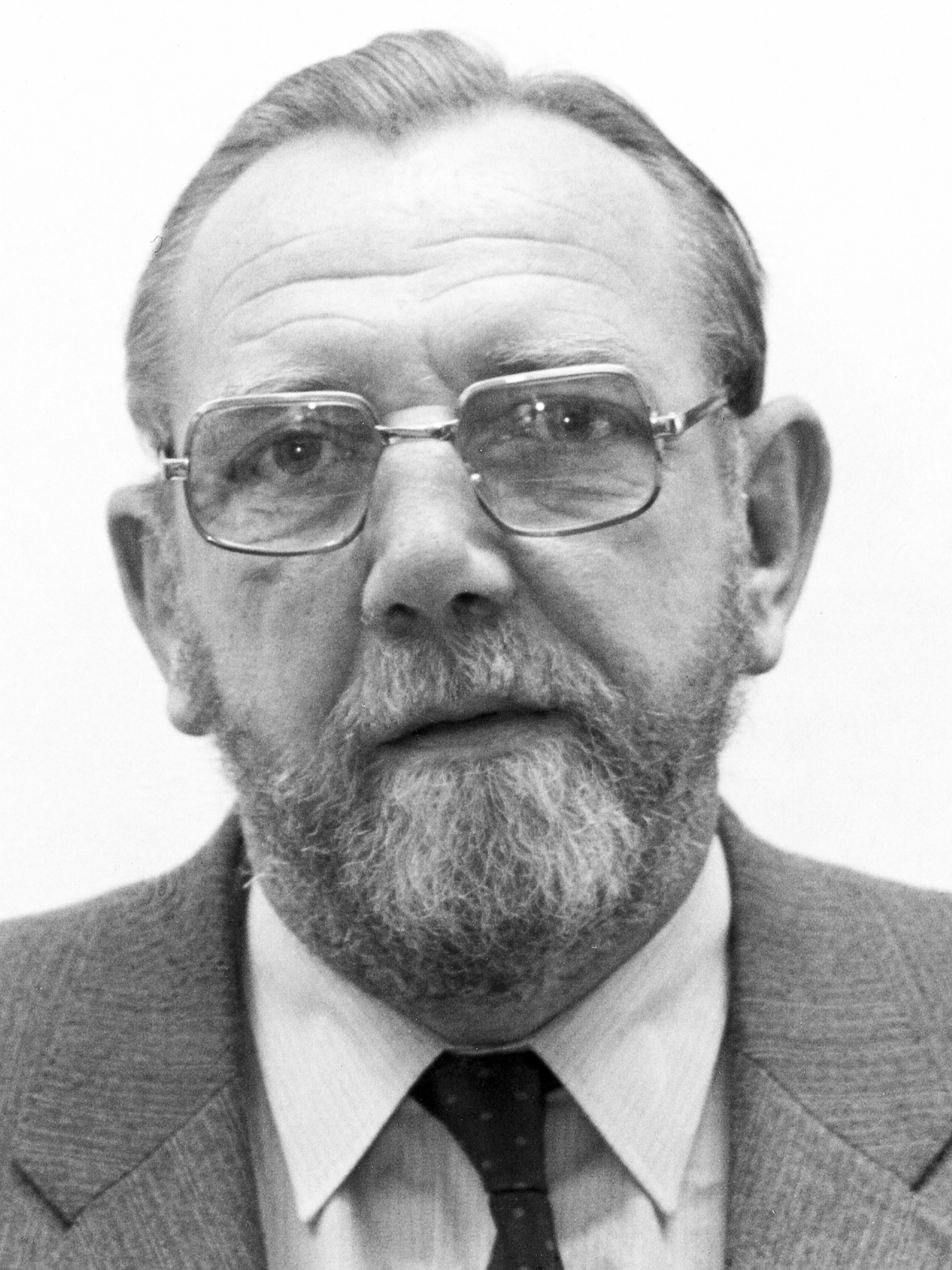

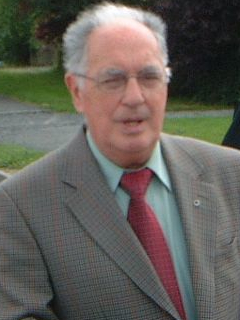

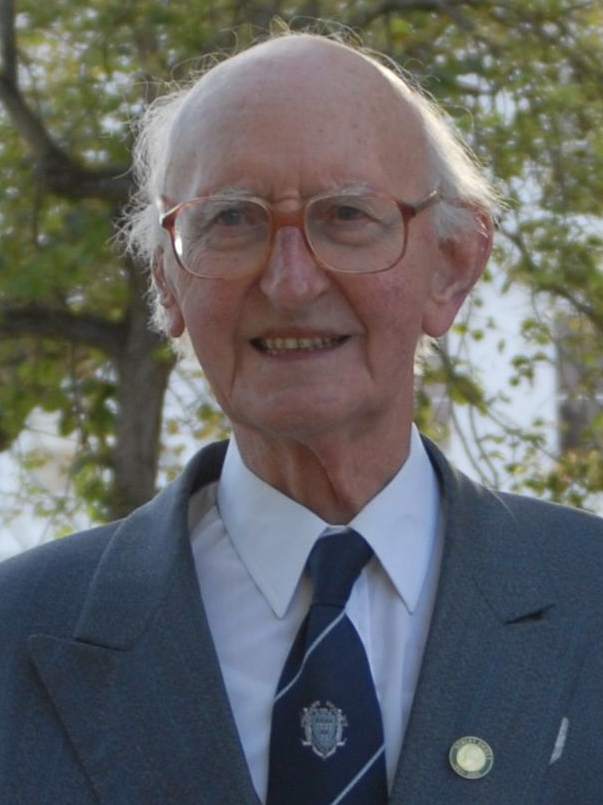

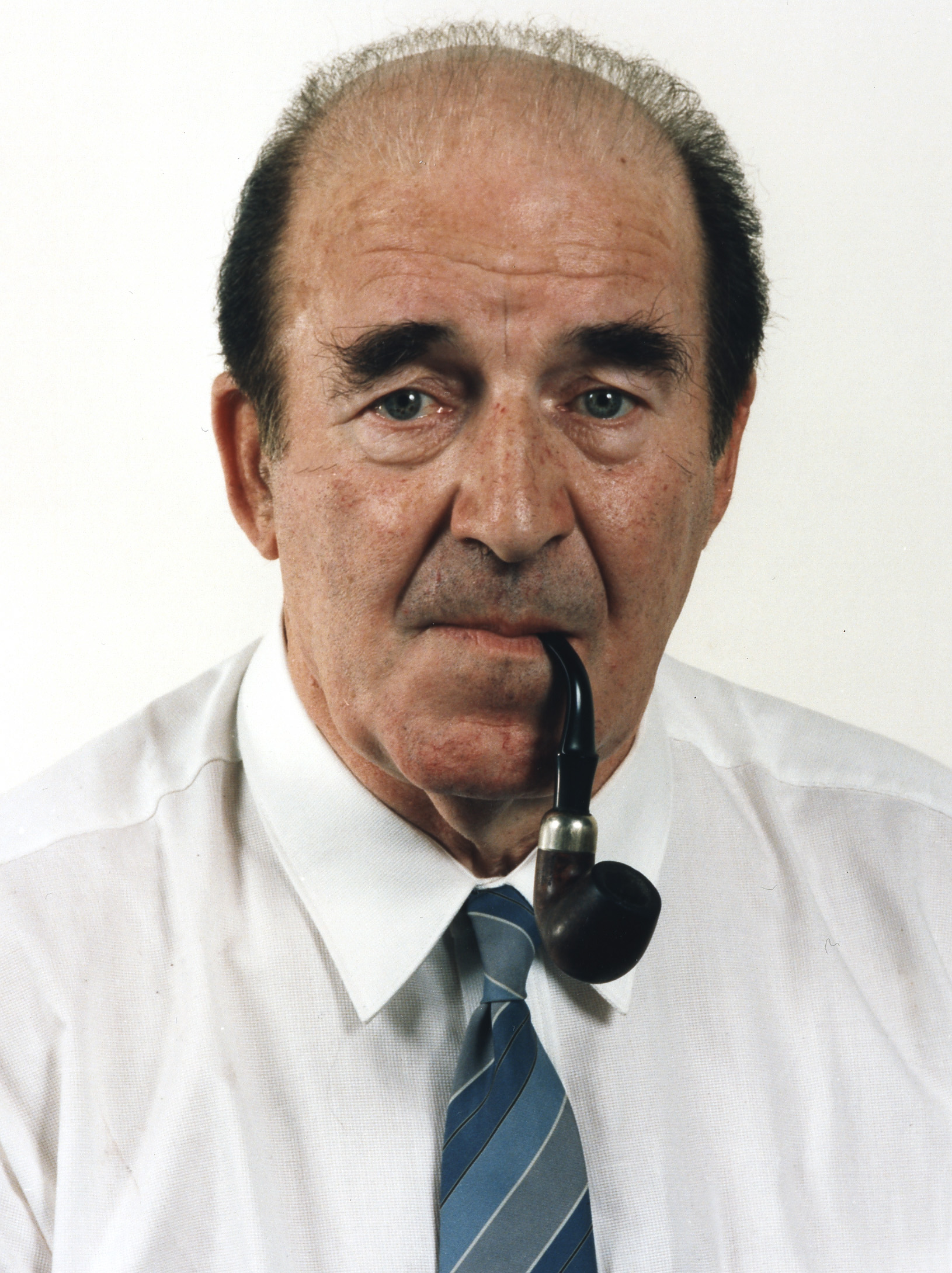
	First party	Second party	Third party
Leader	Jack Lynch	Garret FitzGerald	Frank Cluskey
Party	Fianna Fáil	Fine Gael	Labour
Leader since	9 November 1966	1977	1977
Seats won	328	292	75
Seat change	▼24	▲12	▼4
Popular vote	529,909	469,074	160,684
Percentage	39.0%	34.6%	11.8%
Swing	▼0.8%	▲0.8%	▼0.9%
	Fourth party	Fifth party	Sixth party
Leader	Ruairí Ó Brádaigh	Tomás Mac Giolla	Neil Blaney
Party	Sinn Féin (Provisional)	Sinn Féin The Workers' Party	Independent Fianna Fáil
Leader since	October 1970	14 October 1962	1972
Seats won	11	7	4
Seat change	▲4	▲1	Steady
Popular vote	21,273	31,238	10,245
Percentage	1.6%	2.3%	0.8%
Swing	▼0.2%	▲1.0%	▼0.2%

The 1979 Irish local elections were held in all the counties, cities and towns of Ireland on Thursday, 7 June 1979, on the same day as the first direct elections to the European Parliament.

== Results ==
=== Total seats ===
Party	Seats	±	1st pref	FPv%	±%
Fianna Fáil	328	▼24	529,909	39.0	▼0.8
Fine Gael	292	▲12	469,074	34.6	▲0.9
Labour	75	▼4	160,684	11.8	▼0.9
Sinn Féin (Provisional) (Note: Not a registered party.)	11	▲4	21,273	1.6	▼0.2
Sinn Féin The Workers' Party	7	▲1	31,238	2.3	▼1.0
Independent Fianna Fáil	4	Steady	10,245	0.8	▼0.2
Protestant Association	2	Steady	1,912	0.1	▼0.1
Donegal Progressive Party	1	Steady	1,728	0.1	New
Independent Socialist Party	1	▲1	675	0.0	New
Independent	48	▼25	120,166	8.5	▼0.5
Total			1,421,494	100	—

=== Counties and cities ===
Authority	FF	FG	Lab	SF (P)	SFWP	Other	Total
Carlow	8	9	3			1	21
Cavan	12	11		1		1	25
Clare	17	9	2	1		2	31
Cork City	13	12	4		1	1	31
Cork County	23	18	3		1	2	47
Donegal	10	6	5	1	1	5 (Note: Includes 1 member of the Donegal Progressive Party.)	23
Dublin City	12	15	11		1	6 (Note: Five of the six non-party members of Dublin Corporation were elected as Community candidates, including Tony Gregory, Seán Dublin Bay Loftus and Carmencita Hederman.)	45
Dublin	12	14	9			1	36
Galway	14	11	1	2		2	30
Kerry	14	7	2	1		2	26
Kildare	9	8	4				21
Kilkenny	11	10	4		1		26
Laois	11	12	2				25
Leitrim	11	9		1			21
Limerick City	6	5	4			2	17
Limerick County	15	11				1	27
Longford	8	9		2		2	21
Louth	10	8	2	1	1	4	26
Mayo	15	16					31
Meath	13	9	5			2	29
Monaghan	9	8				3 (Note: Two of the three non-party Monaghan councillors were nominated by the Protestant Association.)	20
Offaly	10	9	1			1	21
Roscommon	12	12		1		1	26
Sligo	10	11	1			2	24
Tipperary North	8	8	4			1	21
Tipperary South	11	8	4			3	26
Waterford City	5	4	2		2	2	15
Waterford County	9	11	1				21
Westmeath	10	9	3			1	23
Wexford	10	7	2			2	21
Wicklow	7	8	4		1	1	21

=== Boroughs ===
Authority	FF	FG	Lab	PSF	SFWP	Other	Total
Clonmel	4	4	3			1	12
Drogheda	3	2	3			4	12
Dún Laoghaire	3	8	4				15
Galway	5	1	1			5	12
Kilkenny	4	3	3			2	12
Sligo	3	4	2			3	12
Wexford	3	1	2	1		5	12
