= Poblacht na hÉireann =

Poblacht na hÉireann (Irish pronunciation: [ˈpˠɔbˠlˠəxt̪ˠ n̪ˠə ˈheːɾʲən̪ˠ]) is an Irish-language phrase which may refer to:

- The revolutionary Irish Republic proclaimed in 1916 and 1919, also termed Saorstát Éireann
- A newspaper first published in 1922 in Ireland by republican opponents of the Anglo-Irish Treaty
- The Republic of Ireland, the legal description since 1949 of the modern sovereign state

== See also ==
- Poblacht (disambiguation)
- Names of the Irish state
