= Lifford Courthouse =

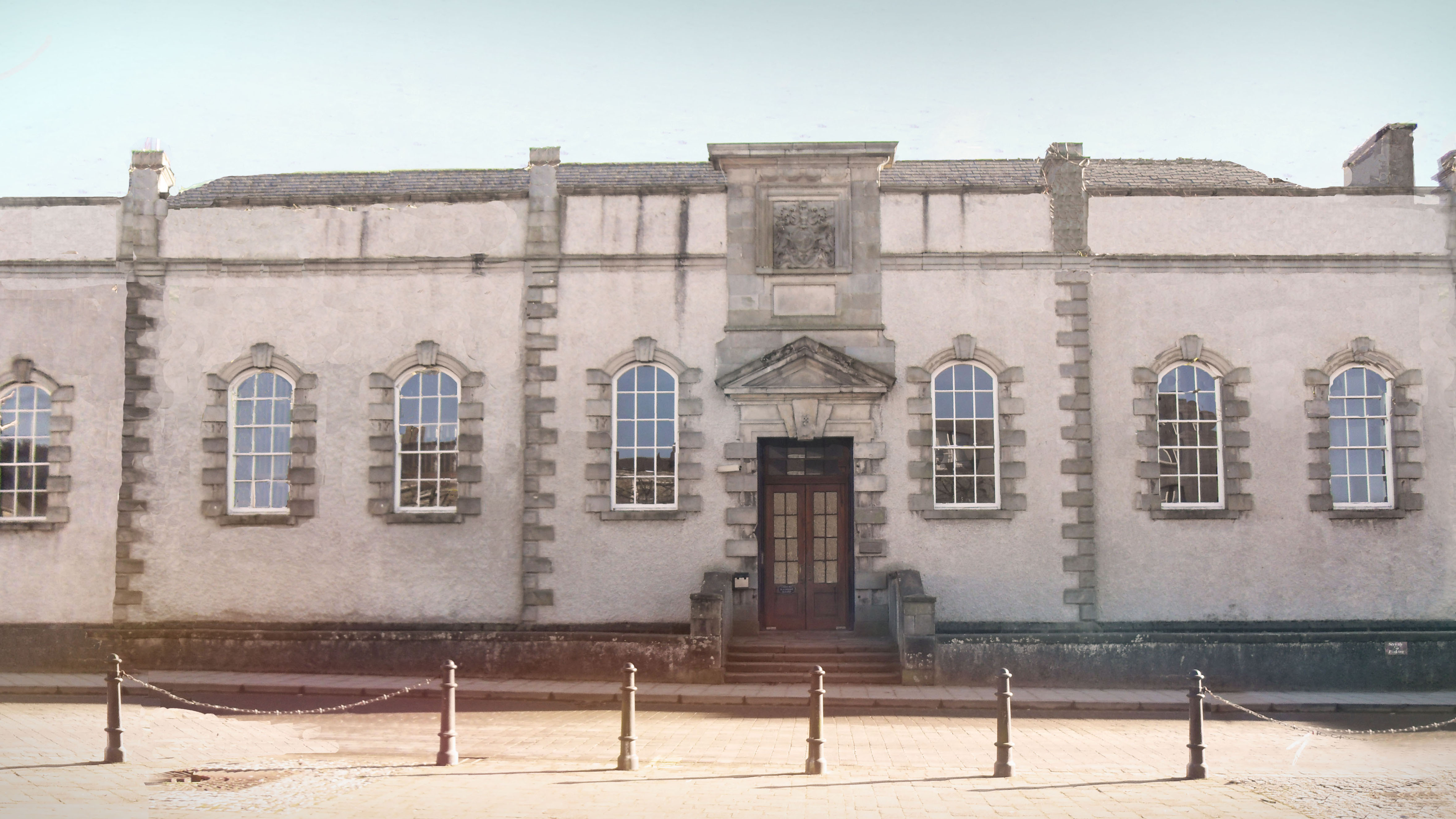
- Lifford Courthouse

- Location within Ireland

General information
- Architectural style: Neoclassical style
- Location: Lifford, County Donegal, Ireland
- Coordinates: 54.8331°N 7.4787°W
- Completed: 1746

Design and construction
- Architect: Michael Priestley

Lifford Courthouse is a judicial building situated in the centre of Lifford, County Donegal, in Ulster, Ireland.

== History ==
The courthouse, which was designed by Michael Priestley in the neoclassical style and built in ashlar stone, was completed in 1746. Previously courts had been held in any suitable building and in one case, when the court met in a public house, the fines collected over the course of a day was used to buy drinks for the jury. The building also incorporated a prison in the basement until a purpose-built facility was opened next to the courthouse in 1793. The design involved an asymmetrical main frontage with eight bays facing The Diamond; the central bay featured a doorway with a banded stone surround and a pediment; there was a stone panel containing the coat of arms of George II above the doorway.

The building was originally used as a facility for dispensing justice but, following the implementation of the Local Government (Ireland) Act 1898, which established county councils in every county, the Grand Jury Room also became the meeting place for Donegal County Council. The purpose-built prison next to the courthouse was demolished in 1907 and the county council moved to County House on the opposite side of the Diamond in 1930.

The building continued to be used as a courthouse until 1938 and then fell into disrepair before being renovated in the late 1980s and then being fully renovated in the early 1990s and being reopened as a Heritage Centre in 1994.

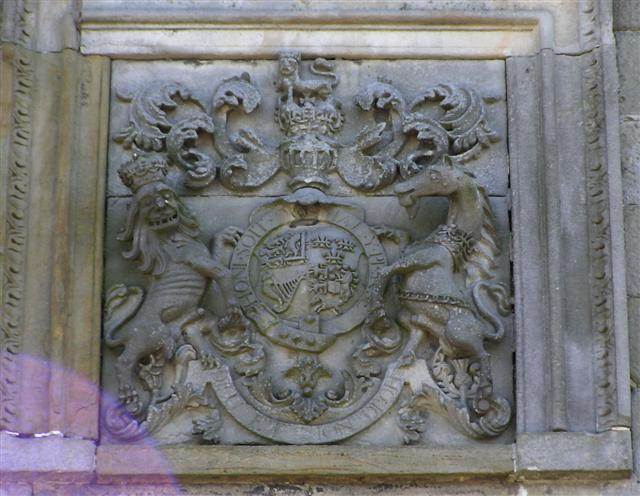
Crest of arms, Lifford Courthouse

== Crime and punishment ==
Transportation was a common punishment in Lifford, with many sent by boat to colonies overseas. Crimes in the courthouse that warranted a sentence of transportation include "stealing 2 caps", "stealing a handkerchief and blankets" and "stealing 5 chickens and 2 hens". Public hangings were also a common spectacle. One hanging in 1831 alone is reported as drawing a crowd of around 12 thousand men, women and children.

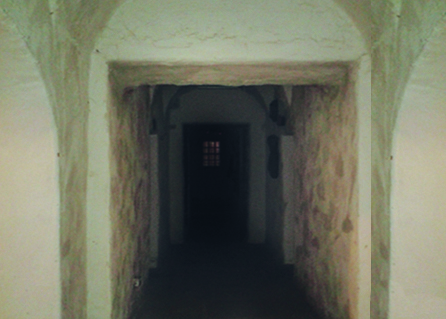
Donegal's County Gaol in the basement of the Old Courthouse

The gallows, at the front of the new gaol, were also the setting for the infamous 'half-hanging' of John 'Half-Hung' MacNaghten, in one of the earliest recorded public hangings at the courthouse in 1761. It was not only murder that carried the sentence of death in Donegal at that time, but also 'killing and maiming cattle' and horse-stealing. The last public execution in Lifford is thought to have been in 1847.

With the phasing out of transportation, prison sentences became a more common punishment in Ireland. Some prisoners were sentenced to an additional punishment of hard labour during their stay in Lifford. Just as in many other prisons throughout Ireland, this usually consisted of breaking stones which were then used to build and repair roads, or grinding up bones, which would then be used as fertilizer. Another more public punishment was whipping, sometimes performed in the town where the offense was originally committed.

== Notable prisoners ==
Notable prisoners included:

- John 'Half Hanged' MacNaghten, convicted murderer.
- James Napper Tandy, founding member of the Society of United Irishmen.
- The crew of "La Hoche". the French frigate on which Wolfe Tone was captured.

== Visitor centre ==
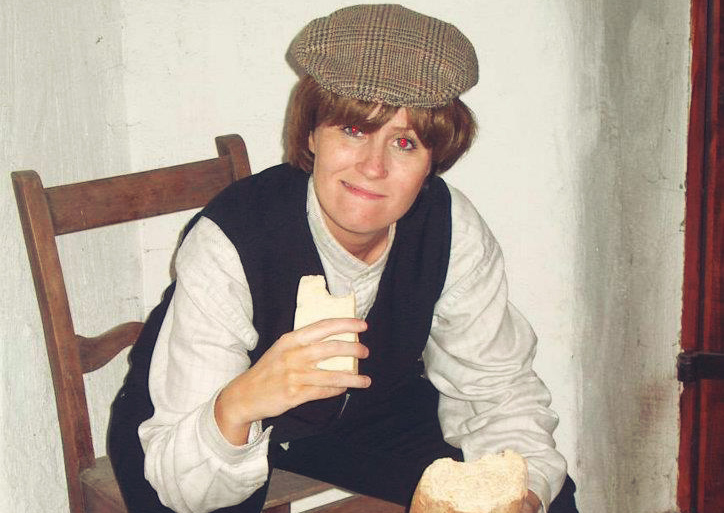
An actor performs a one-man-show in The Old Courthouse, Lifford

Today, the old courthouse operates as a museum/visitor centre, where the public can walk through the cells and experience life as a prisoner. Visitors to the prison are 'arrested' and taken down into the dungeons on the guided tour. This takes the form of a one-man show in which an actor portrays some of the jail's infamous residents. Visitors can also spend 60 minutes locked up in the 'Jailbreak' escape rooms. The building also houses a bistro, a local library, conference rooms, Lifford Museum, and often hosts special events.
