= Poblacht Chríostúil =

Defunct political party in Ireland

Poblacht Chríostúil (Irish pronunciation: [ˈpˠɔbˠlˠəxt̪ˠ ˈçɾʲiːsˠt̪ˠuːlʲ]; meaning "Christian Republic") was a small Irish political party active in Munster in the 1960s, advocating Catholic social teaching, a planned economy, and national self-sufficiency. It was founded in 1957, and in the 1960 local elections it stood three candidates for Cork City Council, gaining 209 votes out of 22,024, and three in Waterford City Council, gaining 328 votes.

In 1964 in Youghal it published Intíreachas: the Social and Economic Policy of Poblacht Chríostúil, which was reviewed sympathetically in Comhar by Seán Ó Brádaigh, prompting replies from Art Ua Laoire, a Limerick party member.

Sylvester Cotter contested the 1965 Cork Mid by-election. At the 1965 general election, Cotter contested again in Cork Mid, and Alexander Miller contested in Cork Borough, losing their deposits each time. Eoghan Harris campaigned for the party and spoke at its rallies. Sylvester Cotter subsequently joined Fine Gael and was elected at the 1991 Cork County Council election.
