= County House, Lifford =

Municipal building in County Donegal, Ireland

- Teach an Chontae, Leifear
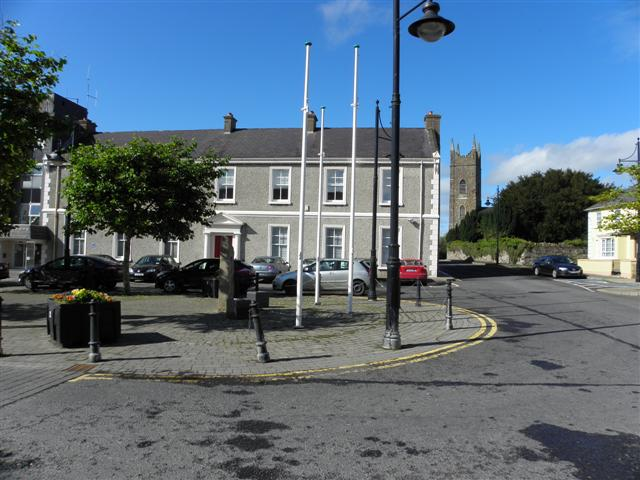
- County House

- Location within Ireland

General information
- Location: The Diamond, Lifford, Ireland
- Coordinates: 54.8334°N 7.4788°W
- Completed: 1820

The County House (Irish: Teach an Chontae, Leifear) is a municipal building in Lifford, County Donegal, Ireland.

== History ==
The building was originally constructed as a reformatory school for young offenders in around 1820. It was substantially rebuilt to the designs of William Harte, the county surveyor, in 1868 before being converted into a barracks for the British Army in around 1900 and then was taken over by the Free State Army on formation of the Irish Free State in 1922. In 1930, Donegal County Council, which had previously held its meetings in Lifford Courthouse, acquired the property for use as its meeting place and administrative headquarters.
