= Grill Music Venue =

Nightclub in Letterkenny, Ireland

- Owner: Tinney family
- Type: Nightclub

Construction
- Opened: 1961

Website
- www.gmv.ie

The Grill Music Venue, also known as The Grill, formerly The Golden Grill, was a nightclub located in Letterkenny, County Donegal, in Ulster, Ireland. Regarded as the unofficial Fianna Fáil headquarters, it has hosted Fianna Fáil party conventions and bingo sessions over the years. The complex housed six bars.

DJs and live acts to have performed at the Grill times include Hot Chip, Ash, Shane MacGowan, Dirty Sanchez, Fun Lovin' Criminals, Paul Van Dyk, Judge Jules, Republic of Loose, Ocean Colour Scene and Chuck Berry.

== History ==
Established by former Fianna Fáil Senator Bernard McGlinchey, the venue first opened in 1961. A success factor for the complex was its 1,000 car parking spaces. Bellas Club was founded in the seventies and the Millionaire Club opened in the eighties.

Forty-six years after it first opened, the entertainment complex underwent a €2 million refurbishment. 21 Spaces, a Dublin-based, Donegal-owned interior design company, designed the newly refurbished complex. Since its refurbishment the venue now houses six bars and two smoking areas.

=== Licence disputes ===
In 2004, Bernard McGlinchey revealed to the Donegal News how he was able to license the premises. He stated the law had been against him as, in the 1960s, a licence-holder needed to prove the population of the parish area had increased by 33%. This was disputed, as at the time he was in the Seanad and Charles Haughey was Minister for Justice and had set about finalising the new Liquor Act and inserted a clause which changed the law for urban areas.

In March 2008, the Grill Music Venue was raided by the Garda Síochána. Gardaí seized alcohol they believed was being sold without a licence under Section 24 of the 1874 Licensing Act.

The management of the venue subsequently renewed their licence and took court action to recover tens of thousands of euros worth of drink seized from the premises by Gardaí.

=== Sale of premises ===
The Grill remained shut unexpectedly on the weekend of the 2 and 3 August 2008. This is a public holiday in Ireland and is known to be one of the busiest throughout the year. It was later revealed that the business had been placed on the property market after confirmation that it had gone into receivership with debts to the value of €8.2 million. Advertisements announcing the sale of the premises by private treaty appeared in weekend newspapers.

The premises re-opened under company name Golden Grill Letterkenny Ltd. after the local Tinney family bought the venue.

The venue fell into disuse in recent years and in 2021 planning permission was sought, in the name of John Barry, for its demolition. Demolition work commenced on the premises in May 2023.

== Performances ==
The Grill Music Venue has played host to a number of international bands and DJs including:

- Shane MacGowan
- Ash
- Hot Chip
- Dirty Sanchez
- Fun Lovin' Criminals
- Paul Van Dyk
- Judge Jules
- Republic of Loose
- Ocean Colour Scene
- Chuck Berry
- Sidney Samson
- The Commitments
- Ham Sandwich
- The Coronas
- The Flaws
- Slade
- Mundy
- Sharon Shannon
- We Are Scientists
- Mercury Rev
- Damien Dempsey
- Max Graham
- Bad Manners
- The Fall
- Cathy Davey
- Richard Hawley
- The Aliens
- Juliet Turner
- David Holmes
- Alabama 3
