= Donegal Progressive Party =

Defunct Irish political party

- Dissolved: November 2009
- Ideology: Protestant minority interests

The Donegal Progressive Party was a minor political party in the Republic of Ireland.

The party drew its support mostly from the unionist and Protestant community in eastern County Donegal. It was opposed to a united Ireland. At the 1973 general election, the party's leader advised Protestants to vote for Fianna Fáil, as it had "the most stable policy" on the border question. Throughout the 1980s and 1990s, the party held a single seat on Donegal County Council, but it lost this at the 1999 local elections. The party was registered to contest local elections only.

Jim Devenney, a butcher and member of the East Donegal Ulster Scots Association and the former deputy chairman of the Ulster-Scots Agency, was the party's final representative. He contested Donegal North-East at the 1992 and 1997 general elections, and stood in Letterkenny again in 2004. The party was removed from the Register of Political Parties in November 2009.

== Elections ==
=== Dáil Éireann ===
Year	Candidate	Votes	%	Seats
1992	Jim Devenney (as an Independent)	2,082	6.67%	0 / 166
1997	Jim Devenney (as an Independent)	1,657	4.66%	0 / 166

=== Local elections (Donegal County Council) ===
Year	Candidate	Votes	%	Position	Seats
1967	multiple	4,520	3.1%	#3 (Donegal County)	1 / 28
1974	Winston Patterson	1,745	13.1%	#3 (Letterkenny)	1 / 28
1979	William Buchanan	1,728	11.7%	#4 (Letterkenny)	1 / 28
1985	William Buchanan	1,506	10.4%	#1 (Letterkenny)	1 / 29
1991	Jim Devenney	1,775	12.9%	#1 (Letterkenny)	1 / 29
1999	Jim Devenney	1,229	10.86%	#6 (Letterkenny)	0 / 29
2004	Jim Devenney	869	7.06%	#7 (Letterkenny)	0 / 29
