= Valentine Jago =

Irish politician and businessman (1913–1983)

Senator
- In office 27 October 1977 – 8 October 1981
- Constituency: Nominated by the Taoiseach

Personal details
- Born: 1913 Cork, Ireland
- Died: 2 November 1983 (aged 69–70) Cork, Ireland
- Party: Cork Civic Party; Fianna Fáil

Richard Valentine Jago (1913 – 2 November 1983) was a politician and businessman in Cork city in Ireland. He was Secretary of the Cork Methodist Association in 1940, Lord Mayor of Cork from 1957 to 1958 when a member of the Cork Civic Party, and chairman of the Cork Chamber of commerce from 1964 to 1965.

After the Civic Party's dissolution in 1966 he joined Fianna Fáil and was nominated to the Seanad by the Taoiseach after the 1977 general election, serving until 1981. He was an unsuccessful Fianna Fáil candidate at the November 1982 general election for the Cork South-Central constituency.

Civic offices
Preceded by Seán Casey	Lord Mayor of Cork; 1957–1958	Succeeded by Seán McCarthy
