= Cork Civic Party =

Defunct Irish political party

The Civic Party was a pro-business political party in Cork city in Ireland from 1945 to 1966. It was a continuation of the Business Party of the 1930s, supported by the chamber of commerce, and also attracted three outgoing Fine Gael councillors among nine candidates in the 1945 elections to the 21-member Cork Corporation (now Cork City Council). Two of those three were successful, as were three others, including Liam de Róiste. The party had links to the Knights of Columbanus.

As Dáil Éireann parties became more prominent in local politics from the 1950s, the Civic Party went into a slow decline, although Valentine Jago, a Methodist businessman, served as Lord Mayor of Cork for the 1957–1958 civic year. The party secured three councillors from 11 candidates at the 1950 elections, two from seven in 1955, and one from eight in 1960. In 1963, the electoral law was changed to empower the Minister for Local Government to divide Cork city into multiple local electoral areas. This was done in 1965, with areas of five and six seats instead of one 21-seat area. This disadvantaged smaller parties, and in 1966 the Civic Party dissolved itself. Jago later joined Fianna Fáil.
