= James Larkin (Independent Fianna Fáil) =

Irish Gaelic footballer and politician (1922–1998)

Senator
- In office 13 May 1982 – 23 February 1983
- Constituency: Nominated by the Taoiseach

Personal details
- Born: 22 August 1932; County Donegal, Ireland
- Died: 6 October 1998 (aged 66); County Donegal, Ireland
- Political party: Fianna Fáil; Independent Fianna Fáil
- Spouse: Eileen McGinley
- Children: 4

James Larkin (22 August 1932 – 6 October 1998) was an Irish Gaelic footballer and politician. He won five Donegal Senior Football Championship medals with the St Eunan's GAA club.

He was nominated by the Taoiseach Charles Haughey to Seanad Éireann in 1982, he served until 1983. He was elected a member of the Letterkenny Urban District Council in 1967 and was chairman of the council on five occasions.

Larkin was founder member of Independent Fianna Fáil. He was the director of elections for Independent Fianna Fáil leader Neil Blaney. His son Dessie Larkin was a Fianna Fáil member of Donegal County Council from 1999 until 2014.
