= 1960 Irish local elections =

Nationwide local authority elections

- 23 – 30 June 1960

The 1960 Irish local elections were held from 23 to 30 June 1960 for the council seats in all counties, cities and towns of the Republic of Ireland. A total of 2,745 candidates stood for 1,454 seats.

== Summary ==
Elections were uncontested in nine urban councils (the urban district councils of Monaghan, Castleblayney, and Westport, and the town commissioners of Ballybay, Ballyshannon, Belturbet, Boyle, Lismore and Mountmellick) and one local electoral area (LEA) of Monaghan County Council. Elsewhere, voter turnout was 54%, ranging from 29% for Dublin City Council to over 80% in Ballina, Cashel, Clonakilty and Kilkee.

The county boroughs of Cork, Limerick, and Waterford each formed a single LEA with large numbers of seats and counts: respectively 21 and 63, 17 and 26, and 15 and 34.

A Carlow–Kilkenny by-election was held on 23 June, the same day as the local elections in the corresponding areas. The Elections Act 1960 enabled the by-election and local elections to use the same administration, giving cost savings estimated at £1,400.

== Details ==
- 1960 Cork Corporation election

== See also ==
- Local government in the Republic of Ireland
