= Sean McEniff =

Irish businessman & politician (1936–2017)

Donegal County Councillor
- In office 28 June 1967 – 21 April 2017
- Constituency: Donegal

Personal details
- Born: 12 January 1936 Letterkenny, County Donegal, Ireland
- Died: 21 April 2017 (aged 81) Dublin, Ireland
- Party: Fianna Fáil

Sean McEniff (12 January 1936 – 21 April 2017) was an Irish businessman and Fianna Fáil politician who served as a Donegal County Councillor for the Donegal local electoral Area. At the time of his death in 2017, he was the longest serving councillor in Ireland.

He was first elected to Donegal County Council in 1967 and was returned every time until the final election before his death, with the exception of 1979 when he stood in the 1979 European Parliament election in the Connacht–Ulster, though was not elected. In 1985, McEniff was featured in an edition of Today Tonight entitled "Law and Order in Donegal". He was Director of Bord Fáilte between 1993 and 1998. He was also named Donegal Person of the Year in 1996.

McEniff was the owner of the Tyrconnell Group, an Irish hotel chain. In 2007, Tyrconnell merged with the Brian McEniff Hotel Group, owned by his brother, Brian McEniff, to form McEniff Hotels. The Dublin branch of McEniff's hotel chain was picketed by protesters in 2013, after he made comments about Irish Travellers. In 2009, he backed a controversial proposal by the Mayor of Donegal to erect a memorial to Louis Mountbatten and the victims of the bombing at Mullaghmore.

In 2016, McEniff issued a public statement through his solicitors in which he denied using his political influence to prevent Gardaí investigating the disappearance of Mary Boyle from questioning a suspect.

McEniff died at the Mater Private Hospital in Dublin on 21 April 2017. He had been in an induced coma after collapsing into water whilst on holiday in Puerto Rico de Gran Canaria in October 2016.
