= 1967 Irish local elections =

Nationwide local authority elections

- 28 June 1967

The 1967 Irish local elections were held in all the counties, cities and towns of Ireland on Wednesday, 28 June 1967. The result was a large gain in seats for Fine Gael, while Fianna Fáil and Labour remained largely unchanged on net seat totals. Others, including independents and Sinn Féin, lost many seats.

Under the Electoral Act 1963, the elections were due to be held in 1965. However, they were postponed twice.

The context of the elections was an Ireland in the process of rapid modernisation. Social changes since the 1960 local elections included the launch of the first national television network, Telefís Éireann, in 1961. The National Farmers Association campaigned against the Fianna Fáil government, which was reducing tariffs in preparation for European Economic Community membership. Several NFA representatives won seats, particularly in Tipperary and Offaly. Labour's breakthrough in Dublin, coupled with a decline in rural areas, marked another step in its transformation from a rural party to an urban one.

== Results ==
Party	Seats	±	First pref. votes	% FPV	±%
Fianna Fáil	333		463,233	40.1	
Fine Gael	285		377,065	32.6	
Labour	80		174,064	15.1	
Independent, Sinn Féin and others	81		141,091	12.2	
Total	779		1,155,453	100.0	—

== See also ==
- Local government in the Republic of Ireland
- Category:Irish local government councils
