= Bernard McGlinchey =

Irish politician (1932–2013)

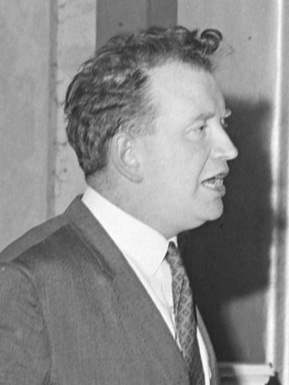
- McGlinchey in 1970

Senator
- In office 13 May 1982 – 23 February 1983
- In office 27 October 1977 – 8 October 1981
- Constituency: Nominated by the Taoiseach
- In office 1 June 1973 – 27 October 1977
- Constituency: Administrative Panel
- In office 14 December 1961 – 1 June 1973
- Constituency: Industrial and Commercial Panel

Personal details
- Born: 18 October 1932 County Donegal, Ireland
- Died: 11 April 2013 (aged 80) County Donegal, Ireland
- Party: Fianna Fáil
- Spouse: Elizabeth McGlinchey
- Domestic partner: Kathleen Sweeney
- Children: 5
- Education: St Eunan's College

Bernard McGlinchey (18 October 1932 – 11 April 2013) was an Irish businessman and Fianna Fáil politician. He was a member of Seanad Éireann from 1961 to 1981, and from 1982 to 1983.

== Early life ==
McGlinchey was born to Patrick McGlinchey and his wife Sarah (née O'Boyle) in 1932, and educated at St Eunan's College. He had six older siblings and one younger one. He was expelled from secondary school.

== Business career ==
A restaurant proprietor, McGlinchey founded the Golden Grill Nightclub, renowned as the unofficial Fianna Fáil headquarters and venue of party conventions. He was a millionaire.

== Political career ==
McGlinchey was first elected to the Seanad by the Industrial and Commercial Panel in 1961. At the 1973 election he was elected by the Administrative Panel, and he was nominated by the Taoiseach in 1977. He did not contest the 1981 election, but in 1982 was nominated by the Taoiseach to the 16th Seanad.

At the start of his political career, McGlinchey was closely linked with Neil Blaney. Paul M. Sacks, an American academic, wrote a book called The Donegal Mafia which detailed the actions of the two men and their team.

He once debated for 12 hours, a Seanad Éireann record for the longest speech.

McGlinchey stood for election to Dáil Éireann in the constituencies of Donegal North-East (1973, 1981, November 1982) and Donegal (1977), but was unsuccessful each time. He was a member of Donegal County Council for the Letterkenny area until 2004.

McGlinchey is said to have "practically invented as a politician" Jim McDaid, selecting "the young, presentable McDaid" and setting him on the path for a career in national politics. McDaid achieved what McGlinchey could not, being elected to the Dáil on his first attempt at the 1989 general election, eventually serving in government.

== Personal life ==
McGlinchey married Elizabeth and had five children: three daughters and two sons.

Bernard McGlinchey died at home on 11 April 2013, at the age of 80. At the time of his death his partner was Kathleen Sweeney.

Letterkenny Town Park is named after McGlinchey.
