= Patrick McGowan (Irish politician) =

Irish politician (1926–1999)

Senator
- In office 25 April 1987 – 3 October 1999
- In office 23 June 1965 – 8 October 1981
- Constituency: Agricultural Panel

Personal details
- Born: 16 July 1926 County Donegal, Ireland
- Died: 3 October 1999 (aged 73) County Donegal, Ireland
- Party: Fianna Fáil
- Spouse: Rosemary McGowan
- Occupation: Politician, Hotelier

Patrick McGowan (16 July 1926 – 3 October 1999) was an Irish Fianna Fáil politician and hotelier from Ballybofey, County Donegal.

As the eldest son of a Donegal business family, McGowan owned both the Inter County Hotel and the Ostán na Rosann Hotel in County Donegal. McGowan's father, Paddy McGowan Senior, was one of the founding members of Fianna Fail in County Donegal.

McGowan was elected to Donegal County Council in 1958 and had been a leading member of Fianna Fail in the county, representing the Finn Valley area. He was a elected to Seanad Éireann from 1965 to 1981, and from 1987 to 1999. He was elected to the Agricultural Panel on which he served for 28 years and was a member of the Oireachtas Committee on Agriculture, Health and Education.

In 1970 he agreed to pay £3,900 including costs to a Donegal businessman, Daniel Brolly, to settle a High Court action for criminal conversation arising from alleged adultery.

His son, Patrick is a member of Donegal County Council since 2019.
