= Donegal County Council =

Local authority of County Donegal, Ireland

Donegal County Council Comhairle Contae Dhún na nGall
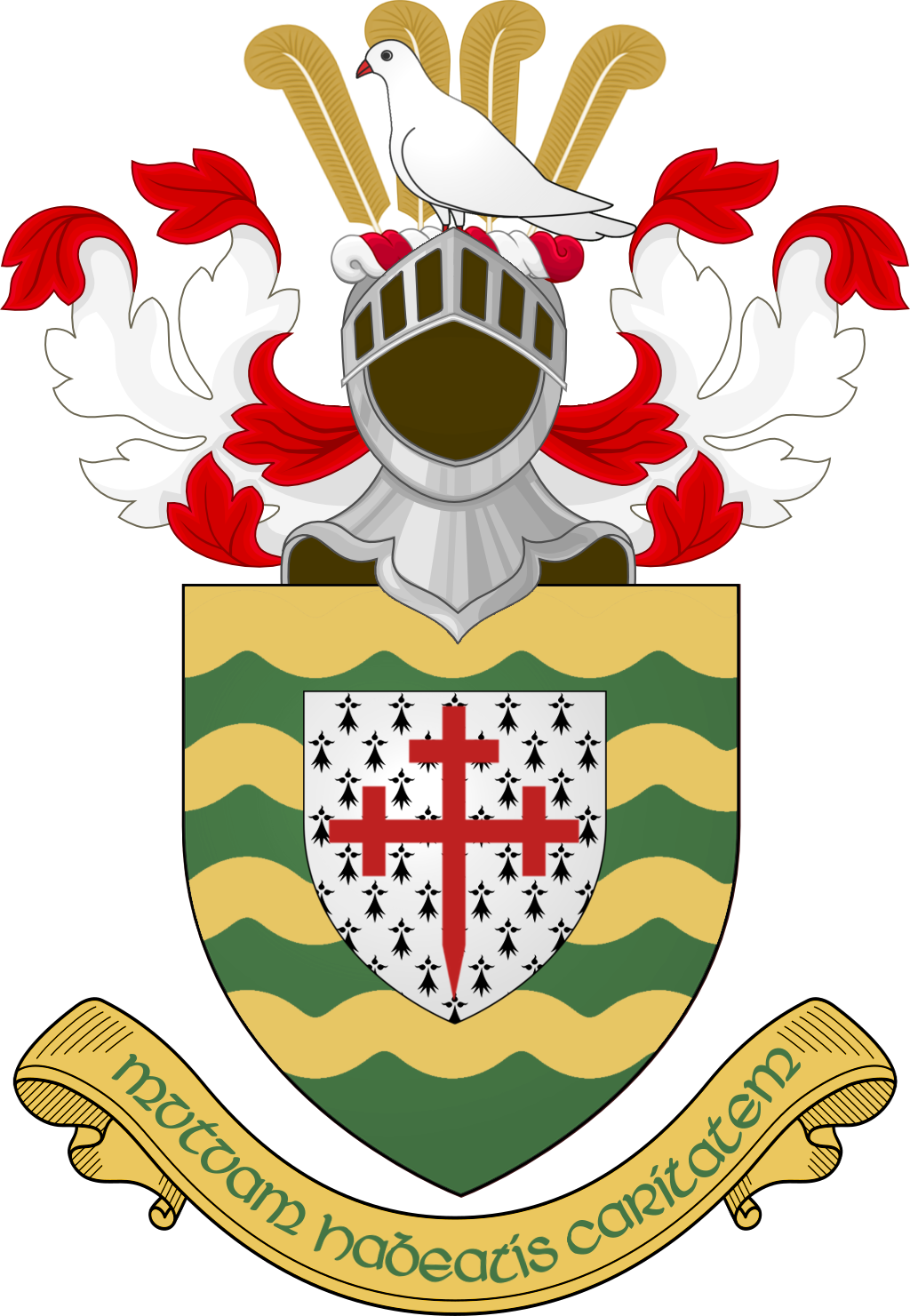

Type
- Type: County council

History
- Founded: 1 April 1899

Leadership
- Cathaoirleach: Gary Doherty, SF

Structure
- Seats: 37
- Political groups: Fianna Fáil (10) Sinn Féin (10) 100% Redress (4) Fine Gael (3) Labour (1) Independent (9)

Elections
- Last election: 7 June 2024

Motto
- Mutuam habeatis caritatem (Latin) "Maintain among you mutual love and charity"

Meeting place
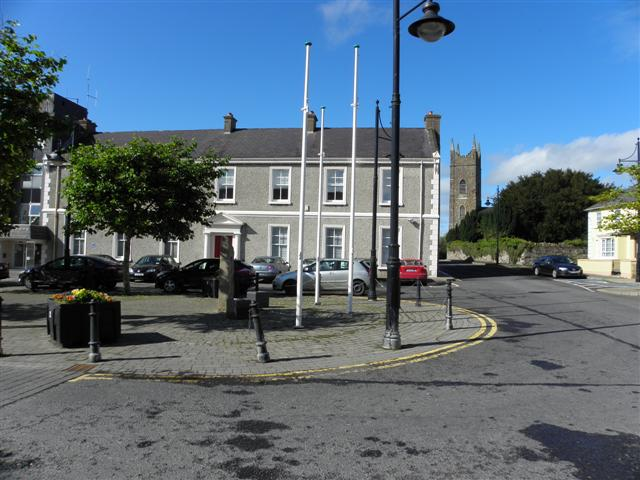
- County House, Lifford

Website
- Official website

The area governed by the council

Donegal County Council (Irish: Comhairle Contae Dhún na nGall) is the authority responsible for local government in County Donegal, Ireland. As a county council, it is governed by the Local Government Act 2001. The council is responsible for housing and community, roads and transportation, urban planning and development, amenity and culture, and environment. It has 37 elected members. Elections are held every five years and are by single transferable vote. The head of the council has the title of Cathaoirleach (chairperson). The county administration is headed by a chief executive, John McLaughlin. The county town is Lifford.

== History ==
Donegal County Council was established on 1 April 1899 under the Local Government (Ireland) Act 1898 for the administrative county of County Donegal, succeeding the former judicial county of Donegal. Before 1925, the chair of each rural district council sat as an ex officio member of the council. Under the Local Government Act 1925, rural district councils in Ireland were abolished and their functions transferred to the county councils. In County Donegal, these were the districts of Ballyshannon, Donegal, Dunfanaghy, Glenties, Inishowen, Letterkenny, Millford, and Stranorlar.

Donegal County Council, which had previously held its meetings in Lifford Courthouse, acquired County House in Lifford for use as its meeting place and administrative headquarters in 1930.

The d'Hondt method has been deployed by Donegal County Council since 2009 and has worked on all but budget day. This led Martin Harley (running mate of Joe McHugh at the 2020 general election) to suggest it be used to help form a government.

Following the 2015 programme RTÉ Investigates: Standards in Public Office, Milford councillor John O'Donnell was found by the Standards in Public Office Commission in March 2019 to have contravened the Local Government Act in three different instances, including failure to maintain proper standards of integrity, conduct and concern for the public interest.

=== Attempted name change to Tirconaill County Council ===
On 25 June 1920, in its first meeting after the election of a Sinn Féin majority, Donegal County Council voted to rename itself to Tirconaill County Council. The name Tirconaill (Tír Chonaill) was used in reference to the túath or Gaelic kingdom of Tír Chonaill (on which Donegal county was based) and the earldom that succeeded it. Tirconaill was seen as a more Irish name by the council, in line with the renaming of King's County Council to Offaly County Council six days prior and Queen's County Council to Leix County Council later that year. There was considerable backlash to this change in Inishowen, which was not within the historic territory of Tirconaill, with some proposing for it to be recognised as a separate county.

The renaming of the county itself received limited recognition, with the Dáil constituency and Army Command retaining the name Donegal and both names appearing in Irish Free State legal documents. This confusing state of affairs was brought to attention at Lifford Equity Sessions in April 1924, resulting in debates regarding both the name change and its legality. In October 1927, a County Council discussion regarding the usage of the name Donegal in the county's official tourist guide resulted in the council unanimously deciding to retain the name Donegal, with the council's secretary declaring that the county had never been legally renamed to Tirconaill. The reasons for this included the perceived exclusion of Inishowen, Gaelic scholars claiming that the name Donegal was at least as Gaelic as Tirconaill and the potential of confusion for foreign tourists. Subsequently, the county boards were renamed from Tirconaill to Donegal.

== Regional Assembly ==
Donegal County Council has three representatives on the Northern and Western Regional Assembly where they are part of the Border Strategic Planning Area Committee.

== Elections ==
Members of Donegal County Council are elected for a five-year term of office on the electoral system of proportional representation by means of the single transferable vote (PR-STV) from multi-member local electoral areas (LEAs).

SFWP WP / SF / Lab / 100%R / Ind. / DPP / IFF / FF / FG		Total seats
1960	1 / 6 / 13 / 8	28
1967	1 / 1 / 15 / 11	28
1974	1 / 2 / 1 / 4 / 10 / 10	28
1979	1 / 1 / 1 / 4 / 11 / 10	28
1985	1 / 2 / 1 / 5 / 11 / 9	29
1991	1 / 1 / 1 / 1 / 1 / 4 / 11 / 9	29
1999	1 / 2 / 4 / 14 / 8	29
2004	4 / 1 / 2 / 14 / 8	29
2009	4 / 2 / 5 / 10 / 8	29
2014	9 / 1 / 10 / 11 / 6	37
2019	10 / 1 / 8 / 12 / 6	37
2024	10 / 1 / 4 / 9 / 10 / 3	37

== Local electoral areas and municipal districts ==
County Donegal is divided into local electoral areas and municipal districts, defined by electoral divisions.

Municipal District	LEA	Definition	Seats
Donegal		An Bhinn Bhán, An Leargaidh Mhór, Ballintra (in the former Rural District of Ballyshannon), Ballintra (in the former Rural District of Donegal), Ballyshannon Rural, Ballyshannon Urban, Bonnyglen, Bundoran Rural, Bundoran Urban, Carrickboy, Cavangarden, Cill Charthaigh, Cill Ghabhlaigh, Cliff, Clogher, Corkermore, Cró Chaorach, Crownarad, Donegal, Dunkineely, Eanymore, Gleann Cholm Cille, Grousehall, Haugh, Inver, Killybegs, Laghy, Loch Iascaigh, Málainn Bhig, Pettigoe, Tantallon, Tawnawully, Templecarn, Tieveskeelta and Tullynaught.	6
Glenties		An Clochán Liath, An Craoslach, An Dúchoraidh, An Ghrafaidh, An Machaire, Anagaire, Árainn Mhór, Ard an Rátha, Ards, Baile na Finne, Caisleán na dTuath, Críoch na Sméar, Cró Bheithe, Dawros, Dún Fionnachaidh, Dún Lúiche, Gleann Gheis, Gleann Léithín, Gort an Choirce, Inis Caoil, Inis Mhic an Doirn, Leitir Mhic an Bhaird, Maas, Machaire Chlochair, Maol Mosóg, Mín an Chladaigh, Na Croisbhealaí and Na Gleannta.	6
Inishowen	Buncrana	Birdstown, Buncrana Rural, Buncrana Urban, Burt, Castleforward, Desertegny, Fahan, Illies, Inch Island, Kilderry, Killea, Mintiaghs, Newtown Cunningham, Three Trees and Whitecastle.	5
Inishowen	Carndonagh	Ardmalin, Ballyliffin, Carndonagh, Carthage, Castlecary, Culdaff, Dunaff, Gleneely (in the former Rural District of Inishowen), Gleneganon, Glentogher, Greencastle, Malin, Moville, Redcastle, Straid, and Turmone	4
Letterkenny–Milford	Letterkenny	Ballymacool, Castlewray, Corravaddy, Edenacarnan, Gortnavern, Killymasny, Kincraigy, Letterkenny Rural, Letterkenny Urban, Magheraboy, Manorcunningham, Mín an Lábáin, Suí Corr and Templedouglas.	7
Letterkenny–Milford	Milford	An Cheathrú Chaol, An Tearmann, Ballyarr, Carraig Airt, Cnoc Colbha, Creamhghort, Fánaid Thiar, Fánaid Thuaidh, Gartán, Glen, Glenalla, Grianfort, Killygarvan, Kilmacrenan, Loch Caol, Millford, Rathmelton, Rathmullan, Ros Goill and Rosnakill.	3
Lifford–Stranorlar		Allt na Péiste, An Clochán, Castlefinn, Cloghard, Clonleigh North, Clonleigh South, Convoy, Dooish, Feddyglass, Figart, Gleneely (in the former Rural District of Stranorlar), Goland, Killygordon, Knock, Lettermore, Mín Charraigeach, Raphoe, St. Johnstown, Stranorlar, Treantaghmucklagh and Urney West.	6

== Councillors ==
The following were elected at the 2024 Donegal County Council election.

Party	Seats
Fianna Fáil	10
Sinn Féin	10
100% Redress	4
Fine Gael	3
Labour	1
Independent	9

=== Councillors by electoral area ===
This list reflects the order in which councillors were elected on 7 June 2024.

Council members from 2024 election
Local electoral area	Name	Party
Buncrana	Jack Murray	Sinn Féin
Buncrana	Joy Beard	100% Redress
Buncrana	Paul Canning	Fianna Fáil
Buncrana	Terry Crossan	Sinn Féin
Buncrana	Fionán Bradley	Fianna Fáil
Carndonagh	Ali Farren	100% Redress
Carndonagh	Martin McDermott	Fianna Fáil
Carndonagh	Albert Doherty	Sinn Féin
Carndonagh	Martin Farren	Labour
Donegal	Micheál Naughton	Fianna Fáil
Donegal	Noel Jordan	Sinn Féin
Donegal	Michael McMahon	Sinn Féin
Donegal	Jimmy Brogan	Independent
Donegal	Manus Boyle (Note: Replaced during term, see table below for details.)	Fine Gael
Donegal	Niamh Kennedy	Independent
Glenties	Micheál Choilm Mac Giolla Easbuig	Independent
Glenties	Michael McClafferty	Independent
Glenties	Anthony Molloy	Fianna Fáil
Glenties	Brian Carr	Sinn Féin
Glenties	John Shéamais Ó Fearraigh	Sinn Féin
Glenties	Denis McGee	100% Redress
Letterkenny	Donal 'Mandy' Kelly	Fianna Fáil
Letterkenny	Tomás Seán Devine	100% Redress
Letterkenny	Gerry McMonagle	Sinn Féin
Letterkenny	Ciaran Brogan	Fianna Fáil
Letterkenny	Jimmy Kavanagh	Fine Gael
Letterkenny	Michael McBride	Independent
Letterkenny	Dónal Coyle	Fianna Fáil
Lifford–Stranorlar	Martin Scanlon	Independent
Lifford–Stranorlar	Gary Doherty	Sinn Féin
Lifford–Stranorlar	Martin Harley	Fine Gael
Lifford–Stranorlar	Frank McBrearty Jnr	Independent
Lifford–Stranorlar	Patrick McGowan	Fianna Fáil
Lifford–Stranorlar	Dakota Nic Mheanman	Sinn Féin
Milford	Declan Meehan	Independent
Milford	Liam Blaney	Fianna Fáil
Milford	Pauric McGarvey	Independent

==== Co-options ====
Party	Outgoing	LEA	Reason	Date	Co-optee
Fine Gael	Manus Boyle	Donegal	Nominated the to 27th Seanad	28 March 2025	Michael Boyle
