= 13th Dáil =

TDs from 1948 to 1951

←	12th Dáil	14th Dáil	→

Overview
- Legislative body: Dáil Éireann
- Jurisdiction: Ireland
- Meeting place: Leinster House
- Term: 18 February 1948 – 2 May 1951
- Election: 1948 general election
- Government: 5th government of Ireland
- Members: 147
- Ceann Comhairle: Frank Fahy
- Taoiseach: John A. Costello
- Tánaiste: William Norton
- Chief Whip: Liam Cosgrave
- Leader of the Opposition: Éamon de Valera

Sessions
- 1st: 18 February 1948 – 6 August 1948
- 2nd: 17 November 1948 – 21 July 1949
- 3rd: 26 October 1949 – 18 July 1950
- 4th: 25 October 1950 – 2 May 1951

The 13th Dáil was elected at the 1948 general election on 4 February 1948 and first met on 18 February 1948. The members of Dáil Éireann, the House of Representatives of the Oireachtas (legislature), of Ireland are known as TDs. It sat with the 6th Seanad as the two Houses of the Oireachtas.

The 13th Dáil was dissolved by President Seán T. O'Kelly on 7 May 1951, at the request of the Taoiseach John A. Costello. The 13th Dáil lasted 3 years, 78 days.

== Composition of the 13th Dáil ==
- First Inter-Party Government (5th government) coalition parties (Note: 7 independents formed part of the government.)

Party	Feb. 1948	May 1951	Change
Fianna Fáil	68	66	▼2
Fine Gael	31	30	▼1
Labour (Note: In May 1950, National Labour rejoined Labour.)	14	19	▲5
Clann na Poblachta	10	7	▼3
Clann na Talmhan	7	6	▼1
National Labour	5	—N/a	▼5
Monetary Reform	1	1	Steady
Independent	11	15	▲4
Ceann Comhairle	—N/a	1	▲1
Vacant	—N/a	2	▲2
Total	147		

=== Graphical representation ===
This is a graphical comparison of party strengths in the 13th Dáil from February 1948. This was not the official seating plan.

== Ceann Comhairle ==
On the meeting of the Dáil, Frank Fahy (FF) was proposed as Ceann Comhairle by Éamon de Valera (FF) and seconded by Richard Mulcahy (FG). His election was approved unanimously. This was the seventh successive Dáil in which Fahy served as Ceann Comhairle.

== TDs by constituency ==
The 147 TDs elected at the 1948 general election are listed by Dáil constituency.

Members of the 13th Dáil
Constituency	Name	Party
Carlow–Kilkenny	Patrick Crotty	Fine Gael
Carlow–Kilkenny	Joseph Hughes	Fine Gael
Carlow–Kilkenny	Thomas Derrig	Fianna Fáil
Carlow–Kilkenny	James Pattison	National Labour Party
Carlow–Kilkenny	Thomas Walsh	Fianna Fáil
Cavan	Patrick O'Reilly	Independent
Cavan	Michael Sheridan	Fianna Fáil
Cavan	Paddy Smith	Fianna Fáil
Cavan	John Tully	Clann na Poblachta
Clare	Thomas Burke	Independent
Clare	Éamon de Valera	Fianna Fáil
Clare	Patrick Hogan	Labour
Clare	Seán O'Grady	Fianna Fáil
Cork Borough	James Hickey	National Labour Party
Cork Borough	Jack Lynch	Fianna Fáil
Cork Borough	Patrick McGrath	Fianna Fáil
Cork Borough	Thomas F. O'Higgins	Fine Gael
Cork Borough	Michael Sheehan	Independent
Cork East	Martin Corry	Fianna Fáil
Cork East	Seán Keane	Labour
Cork East	Patrick O'Gorman	Fine Gael
Cork North	Patrick Halliden	Clann na Talmhan
Cork North	Patrick McAuliffe	Labour
Cork North	Seán Moylan	Fianna Fáil
Cork South	Seán Buckley	Fianna Fáil
Cork South	Dan Desmond	Labour
Cork South	Patrick Lehane	Clann na Talmhan
Cork West	Seán Collins	Fine Gael
Cork West	Timothy J. Murphy	Labour
Cork West	Timothy O'Sullivan	Fianna Fáil
Donegal East	Neal Blaney	Fianna Fáil
Donegal East	John Friel	Fianna Fáil
Donegal East	Daniel McMenamin	Fine Gael
Donegal East	William Sheldon	Independent
Donegal West	Brian Brady	Fianna Fáil
Donegal West	Cormac Breslin	Fianna Fáil
Donegal West	Michael Óg McFadden	Fine Gael
Dublin County	Patrick Burke	Fianna Fáil
Dublin County	Seán Dunne	Labour
Dublin County	Éamon Rooney	Fine Gael
Dublin North-Central	Vivion de Valera	Fianna Fáil
Dublin North-Central	Patrick McGilligan	Fine Gael
Dublin North-Central	Martin O'Sullivan	Labour
Dublin North-East	Jack Belton	Fine Gael
Dublin North-East	Alfie Byrne	Independent
Dublin North-East	Harry Colley	Fianna Fáil
Dublin North-East	Peadar Cowan	Clann na Poblachta
Dublin North-East	Oscar Traynor	Fianna Fáil
Dublin North-West	Cormac Breathnach	Fianna Fáil
Dublin North-West	A. P. Byrne	Independent
Dublin North-West	Mick Fitzpatrick	Clann na Poblachta
Dublin South-Central	Maurice E. Dockrell	Fine Gael
Dublin South-Central	James Larkin Jnr	Labour
Dublin South-Central	Con Lehane	Clann na Poblachta
Dublin South-Central	Seán Lemass	Fianna Fáil
Dublin South-Central	John McCann	Fianna Fáil
Dublin South-East	Noël Browne	Clann na Poblachta
Dublin South-East	John A. Costello	Fine Gael
Dublin South-East	Seán MacEntee	Fianna Fáil
Dublin South-West	Robert Briscoe	Fianna Fáil
Dublin South-West	Bernard Butler	Fianna Fáil
Dublin South-West	Peadar Doyle	Fine Gael
Dublin South-West	Seán MacBride	Clann na Poblachta
Dublin South-West	Michael O'Higgins	Fine Gael
Dún Laoghaire and Rathdown	Seán Brady	Fianna Fáil
Dún Laoghaire and Rathdown	Joseph Brennan	Clann na Poblachta
Dún Laoghaire and Rathdown	Liam Cosgrave	Fine Gael
Galway North	Michael Donnellan	Clann na Talmhan
Galway North	Mark Killilea Snr	Fianna Fáil
Galway North	Michael F. Kitt	Fianna Fáil
Galway South	Patrick Beegan	Fianna Fáil
Galway South	Frank Fahy	Fianna Fáil
Galway South	Robert Lahiffe	Fianna Fáil
Galway West	Gerald Bartley	Fianna Fáil
Galway West	Michael Lydon	Fianna Fáil
Galway West	Joseph Mongan	Fine Gael
Kerry North	Patrick Finucane	Clann na Talmhan
Kerry North	Eamon Kissane	Fianna Fáil
Kerry North	Tom McEllistrim	Fianna Fáil
Kerry North	Dan Spring	National Labour Party
Kerry South	Honor Crowley	Fianna Fáil
Kerry South	John Flynn	Independent
Kerry South	Patrick Palmer	Fine Gael
Kildare	Thomas Harris	Fianna Fáil
Kildare	William Norton	Labour
Kildare	Gerard Sweetman	Fine Gael
Leix–Offaly	Patrick Boland	Fianna Fáil
Leix–Offaly	William Davin	Labour
Leix–Offaly	Oliver J. Flanagan	Monetary Reform
Leix–Offaly	Patrick Gorry	Fianna Fáil
Leix–Offaly	Tom O'Higgins	Fine Gael
Limerick East	Daniel Bourke	Fianna Fáil
Limerick East	Michael Keyes	Labour
Limerick East	James Reidy	Fine Gael
Limerick East	Robert Ryan	Fianna Fáil
Limerick West	James Collins	Fianna Fáil
Limerick West	David Madden	Fine Gael
Limerick West	Donnchadh Ó Briain	Fianna Fáil
Longford–Westmeath	Thomas Carter	Fianna Fáil
Longford–Westmeath	Erskine H. Childers	Fianna Fáil
Longford–Westmeath	Charles Fagan	Independent
Longford–Westmeath	Michael Kennedy	Fianna Fáil
Longford–Westmeath	Seán Mac Eoin	Fine Gael
Louth	Frank Aiken	Fianna Fáil
Louth	James Coburn	Fine Gael
Louth	Roddy Connolly	Labour
Mayo North	Patrick Browne	Fine Gael
Mayo North	James Kilroy	Fianna Fáil
Mayo North	P. J. Ruttledge	Fianna Fáil
Mayo South	Joseph Blowick	Clann na Talmhan
Mayo South	Bernard Commons	Clann na Talmhan
Mayo South	Mícheál Ó Móráin	Fianna Fáil
Mayo South	Richard Walsh	Fianna Fáil
Meath	Patrick Giles	Fine Gael
Meath	Michael Hilliard	Fianna Fáil
Meath	Matthew O'Reilly	Fianna Fáil
Monaghan	James Dillon	Independent
Monaghan	Patrick Maguire	Fianna Fáil
Monaghan	Bridget Rice	Fianna Fáil
Roscommon	John Beirne	Clann na Talmhan
Roscommon	Gerald Boland	Fianna Fáil
Roscommon	Jack McQuillan	Clann na Poblachta
Roscommon	Daniel O'Rourke	Fianna Fáil
Sligo–Leitrim	Stephen Flynn	Fianna Fáil
Sligo–Leitrim	Eugene Gilbride	Fianna Fáil
Sligo–Leitrim	Bernard Maguire	Independent
Sligo–Leitrim	Mary Reynolds	Fine Gael
Sligo–Leitrim	Joseph Roddy	Fine Gael
Tipperary North	Patrick Kinane	Clann na Poblachta
Tipperary North	Daniel Morrissey	Fine Gael
Tipperary North	Mary Ryan	Fianna Fáil
Tipperary South	Dan Breen	Fianna Fáil
Tipperary South	Michael Davern	Fianna Fáil
Tipperary South	Richard Mulcahy	Fine Gael
Tipperary South	John Timoney	Clann na Poblachta
Waterford	Thomas Kyne	Labour
Waterford	Patrick Little	Fianna Fáil
Waterford	John Ormonde	Fianna Fáil
Waterford	Bridget Redmond	Fine Gael
Wexford	Denis Allen	Fianna Fáil
Wexford	Brendan Corish	Labour
Wexford	John Esmonde	Fine Gael
Wexford	John O'Leary	National Labour Party
Wexford	James Ryan	Fianna Fáil
Wicklow	Thomas Brennan	Fianna Fáil
Wicklow	Patrick Cogan	Independent
Wicklow	James Everett	National Labour Party

== Changes ==
Date	Constituency	Loss	Gain	Note
18 February 1948	Galway South	Fianna Fáil	Ceann Comhairle	Frank Fahy takes office as Ceann Comhairle
2 July 1948	Dublin North-East	Clann na Poblachta	Independent	Peadar Cowan expelled from party for stance on aid from Marshall Plan
30 October 1948	Donegal East	Fianna Fáil		Death of Neal Blaney
7 December 1948	Donegal East		Fianna Fáil	Neil Blaney holds the seat vacated by the death of his father Neal Blaney
19 April 1949	Cork West	Labour		Death of Timothy J. Murphy
15 June 1949	Cork West		Labour	William J. Murphy holds the seat vacated by the death of his father Timothy J. Murphy
10 September 1949	Donegal West	Fianna Fáil		Death of Brian Brady
16 November 1949	Donegal West		Fine Gael	Patrick O'Donnell wins the seat vacated by the death of Brady
May 1950	Carlow–Kilkenny	National Labour Party	Labour	James Pattison re-joins Labour Party
May 1950	Cork Borough	National Labour Party	Labour	James Hickey re-joins Labour Party
May 1950	Kerry North	National Labour Party	Labour	Dan Spring re-joins Labour Party
May 1950	Wexford	National Labour Party	Labour	John O'Leary re-joins Labour Party
May 1950	Wicklow	National Labour Party	Labour	James Everett re-joins Labour Party
20 September 1950	Wexford	Fine Gael	Independent	Resignation of John Esmonde from party
12 March 1951	Galway West	Fine Gael		Death of Joseph Mongan
12 April 1951	Dublin South-East	Clann na Poblachta	Independent	Noël Browne resigns from party on his resignation as Minister for Health
13 April 1951	Roscommon	Clann na Poblachta	Independent	Jack McQuillan resigns from party in sympathy with Browne
29 April 1951	Kerry North	Clann na Talmhan	Independent	Patrick Finucane resigns from party in opposition to government milk policy
1 May 1951	Wexford	Independent		Resignation from Dáil of John Esmonde
