= McGinley =

McGinley is an Irish surname. Notable people with the surname include:

- Bernard McGinley (born 1946), American judge
- Billy McGinley (born 1954), Scottish footballer
- Ciaran McGinley, Irish Gaelic footballer
- Conde McGinley (1890–1963), American publisher
- Cormac McGinley, Irish Gaelic footballer
- Dinny McGinley (born 1945), Irish politician
- Donald McGinley (1920–2005), American lawyer and politician
- Ed McGinley (1899–1985), American football player
- Enda McGinley (born 1981), Irish Gaelic footballer
- Eugene McGinley, Canadian politician
- Jim McGinley (1878–1961), American baseball player
- John McGinley (born 1959), English footballer
- John C. McGinley (born 1959), American actor
- Joseph McGinley, Irish politician
- Mark Anthony McGinley, Irish Gaelic footballer
- Martin McGinley, Irish fiddler
- Matt McGinley (born 1983), American drummer
- Matthew McGinley (born 1988), Scottish footballer
- Michael McGinley, Irish songwriter
- Mick McGinley (born 1940/1), Irish Gaelic footballer and father of professional golfer Paul
- Noel McGinley, Irish Gaelic footballer
- Patrick McGinley (born 1937), Irish writer
- Paul McGinley (born 1966), Irish golfer and son of Gaelic footballer Mick
- Peter McGinley (born 1970s), Irish Gaelic footballer
- Philip McGinley (born 1981), English actor
- Phyllis McGinley (1905–1978), American writer
- Ryan McGinley (born 1977), American photographer
- Seán McGinley (born ca. 1956), Irish actor
- Ted McGinley (born 1958), American actor
- Tim McGinley (1854–1899), American baseball player
