= 1948 Donegal East by-election =

By-election to the 13th Dáil

- 7 December 1948
- Turnout: 35,255 (73.1%)
	Blaney	McGinley	O'Donnell
Nominee	Neil Blaney	Joseph McGinley	James O'Donnell
Party	Fianna Fáil	Fine Gael	Clann na Poblachta
First preferences	19,570	14,250	1,435
Percentage	55.5%	40.4%	4.0%
TD before election
Neal Blaney
Fianna Fáil
TD after election
Neil Blaney
Fianna Fáil

A Dáil by-election was held in the constituency of Donegal East in Ireland on Tuesday, 7 December 1948, to fill a vacancy in the 13th Dáil. It followed the death of Fianna Fáil Teachta Dála (TD) Neal Blaney on 30 October 1948.

The writ of election to fill the vacancy was agreed by the Dáil on 17 November 1948.

The by-election was won by the Fianna Fáil candidate Neil Blaney, son of the deceased TD, Neal Blaney.

== Result ==
1948 Donegal East by-election
Party	Candidate	FPv%	Count
Party	Candidate	FPv%	1
Fianna Fáil	Neil Blaney	55.5	19,570
Fine Gael	Joseph McGinley	40.4	14,250
Clann na Poblachta	James O'Donnell	4.0	1,435
Electorate: 48,204 Valid: 35,255 Quota: 17,628 Turnout: 73.1%
