= Edward Cotter (politician) =

Irish politician (1902–1972)

Teachta Dála
- In office October 1961 – June 1969
- Constituency: Cork South-West
- In office May 1954 – October 1961
- Constituency: Cork West

Personal details
- Born: 27 June 1902 County Cork, Ireland
- Died: 11 December 1972 (aged 70) County Cork, Ireland
- Party: Fianna Fáil

Edward Cotter (27 June 1902 – 11 December 1972) was an Irish Fianna Fáil politician. He unsuccessfully contested the Cork West constituency June 1949 by-election caused by the death of Timothy J. Murphy but was elected to Dáil Éireann as a Fianna Fáil Teachta Dála (TD) for the Cork West constituency at the 1954 general election. He moved to the Cork South-West at the 1961 general election and continued to hold his seat until he retired at the 1969 general election.

| Dáil | Election | Deputy (Party) | Deputy (Party) | Deputy (Party) | Deputy (Party) | Deputy (Party) |
|---|---|---|---|---|---|---|
| 4th | 1923 | Timothy J. Murphy (Lab) | Seán Buckley (Rep) | Cornelius Connolly (CnaG) | John Prior (CnaG) | Timothy O'Donovan (FP) |
| 5th | 1927 (Jun) | Timothy J. Murphy (Lab) | Thomas Mullins (FF) | Timothy Sheehy (CnaG) | Jasper Wolfe (Ind.) | Timothy O'Donovan (FP) |
| 6th | 1927 (Sep) | Timothy J. Murphy (Lab) | Thomas Mullins (FF) | Timothy Sheehy (CnaG) | Jasper Wolfe (Ind.) | Timothy O'Donovan (FP) |
| 7th | 1932 | Timothy J. Murphy (Lab) | Raphael Keyes (FF) | Eamonn O'Neill (CnaG) | Jasper Wolfe (Ind.) | Timothy O'Donovan (FP) |
| 8th | 1933 | Timothy J. Murphy (Lab) | Tom Hales (FF) | Eamonn O'Neill (CnaG) | James Burke (CnaG) | Timothy O'Donovan (NCP) |
| 9th | 1937 | Timothy J. Murphy (Lab) | Timothy O'Sullivan (FF) | Daniel O'Leary (FG) | Eamonn O'Neill (FG) | Timothy O'Donovan (FG) |
| 10th | 1938 | Timothy J. Murphy (Lab) | Timothy O'Sullivan (FF) | Seán Buckley (FF) | Eamonn O'Neill (FG) | Timothy O'Donovan (FG) |
| 11th | 1943 | Timothy J. Murphy (Lab) | Timothy O'Sullivan (FF) | Seán Buckley (FF) | Patrick O'Driscoll (Ind.) | Timothy O'Donovan (FG) |
| 12th | 1944 | Timothy J. Murphy (Lab) | Timothy O'Sullivan (FF) | Seán Buckley (FF) | Patrick O'Driscoll (Ind.) | Eamonn O'Neill (FG) |
| 13th | 1948 | Timothy J. Murphy (Lab) | Timothy O'Sullivan (FF) | Seán Collins (FG) | 3 seats 1948–1961 | |
| 13th | 1949 by-election | William J. Murphy (Lab) | Timothy O'Sullivan (FF) | Seán Collins (FG) | 3 seats 1948–1961 | |
| 14th | 1951 | Michael Pat Murphy (Lab) | Timothy O'Sullivan (FF) | Seán Collins (FG) | 3 seats 1948–1961 | |
| 15th | 1954 | Michael Pat Murphy (Lab) | Edward Cotter (FF) | Seán Collins (FG) | 3 seats 1948–1961 | |
| 16th | 1957 | Michael Pat Murphy (Lab) | Edward Cotter (FF) | Florence Wycherley (Ind.) | 3 seats 1948–1961 | |
| 17th | 1961 | Constituency abolished. See Cork South-West | | | | |

| Dáil | Election | Deputy (Party) | Deputy (Party) | Deputy (Party) |
|---|---|---|---|---|
| 17th | 1961 | Seán Collins (FG) | Michael Pat Murphy (Lab) | Edward Cotter (FF) |
| 18th | 1965 | Seán Collins (FG) | Michael Pat Murphy (Lab) | Edward Cotter (FF) |
| 19th | 1969 | John O'Sullivan (FG) | Michael Pat Murphy (Lab) | Flor Crowley (FF) |
| 20th | 1973 | John O'Sullivan (FG) | Michael Pat Murphy (Lab) | Flor Crowley (FF) |
| 21st | 1977 | Jim O'Keeffe (FG) | Michael Pat Murphy (Lab) | Joe Walsh (FF) |
| 22nd | 1981 | Jim O'Keeffe (FG) | P. J. Sheehan (FG) | Flor Crowley (FF) |
| 23rd | 1982 (Feb) | Jim O'Keeffe (FG) | P. J. Sheehan (FG) | Joe Walsh (FF) |
| 24th | 1982 (Nov) | Jim O'Keeffe (FG) | P. J. Sheehan (FG) | Joe Walsh (FF) |
| 25th | 1987 | Jim O'Keeffe (FG) | P. J. Sheehan (FG) | Joe Walsh (FF) |
| 26th | 1989 | Jim O'Keeffe (FG) | P. J. Sheehan (FG) | Joe Walsh (FF) |
| 27th | 1992 | Jim O'Keeffe (FG) | P. J. Sheehan (FG) | Joe Walsh (FF) |
| 28th | 1997 | Jim O'Keeffe (FG) | P. J. Sheehan (FG) | Joe Walsh (FF) |
| 29th | 2002 | Jim O'Keeffe (FG) | Denis O'Donovan (FF) | Joe Walsh (FF) |
| 30th | 2007 | Jim O'Keeffe (FG) | P. J. Sheehan (FG) | Christy O'Sullivan (FF) |
| 31st | 2011 | Jim Daly (FG) | Noel Harrington (FG) | Michael McCarthy (Lab) |
| 32nd | 2016 | Jim Daly (FG) | Michael Collins (Ind.) | Margaret Murphy O'Mahony (FF) |
| 33rd | 2020 | Holly Cairns (SD) | Michael Collins (Ind.) | Christopher O'Sullivan (FF) |
| 34th | 2024 | Holly Cairns (SD) | Michael Collins (II) | Christopher O'Sullivan (FF) |
