= Henry McDevitt =

Irish politician (1904–1966)

Teachta Dála
- In office June 1938 – June 1943
- Constituency: Donegal East

Personal details
- Born: 1904 County Donegal, Ireland
- Died: 4 January 1966 (aged 61–62) County Donegal, Ireland
- Party: Fianna Fáil
- Relatives: Mark Reckless (grandson)

Henry Aloysius McDevitt (1904 – 4 January 1966) was an Irish Fianna Fáil politician and barrister. He was elected, at his second attempt, to Dáil Éireann as a Teachta Dála (TD) for the Donegal East constituency at the 1938 general election. He did not contest the 1943 general election.

McDevitt's grandson is Mark Reckless a former MP for Rochester and Strood (2010–2015), and a former Member of the Senedd for South Wales East (2016-2021).

Dáil	Election	Deputy (Party)	Deputy (Party)	Deputy (Party)	Deputy (Party)
9th	1937	John Friel (FF)	Neal Blaney (FF)	James Myles (Ind.)	Daniel McMenamin (FG)
10th	1938	John Friel (FF)	Henry McDevitt (FF)	James Myles (Ind.)	Daniel McMenamin (FG)
11th	1943	John Friel (FF)	Neal Blaney (FF)	William Sheldon (CnaT)	Daniel McMenamin (FG)
12th	1944	John Friel (FF)	Neal Blaney (FF)	William Sheldon (Ind.)	Daniel McMenamin (FG)
13th	1948	John Friel (FF)	Neal Blaney (FF)	William Sheldon (Ind.)	Daniel McMenamin (FG)
13th	1948 by-election	John Friel (FF)	Neil Blaney (FF)	William Sheldon (Ind.)	Daniel McMenamin (FG)
14th	1951	Liam Cunningham (FF)	Neil Blaney (FF)	William Sheldon (Ind.)	Daniel McMenamin (FG)
15th	1954	Liam Cunningham (FF)	Neil Blaney (FF)	William Sheldon (Ind.)	Daniel McMenamin (FG)
16th	1957	Liam Cunningham (FF)	Neil Blaney (FF)	William Sheldon (Ind.)	Daniel McMenamin (FG)
17th	1961	Constituency abolished. See Donegal North-East and Donegal South-West			
