= Michael McGinley =

Irish songwriter

Michael McGinley (born 1852 in Alt an Iarann, Gleann tSúilí, County Donegal, Ireland) was an Irish songwriter known for the songs "The Hills of Glenswilly" and "An Emigrant's Farewell", written as he travelled on the ship The Invercargill to New Zealand in 1878. He was a Fenian and maintained strong Fenian principles throughout his life.

Having returned to Ireland, he married Bridget McDevitt, 18 years his junior in 1901. One of their children was Nora, a republican socialist and activist. They first farmed a small holding at Breenagh, but later leased a pub in Strabane, County Tyrone, and then moved to Ballybofey, County Donegal. He wrote the ballad The Woods of Drumboe (aka The Drumboe Martyrs) to memorialise the four anti-treaty republicans who were executed in Drumboe on 14 March 1923.

He was the older brother of Peadar Toner Mac Fhionnlaoich, an Irish language writer and the uncle of politician and surgeon Joseph Mc Ginley. His sister Bridget Mc Ginley, was also a poet who amongst other works penned the poem, 'the hills of Donegal'.
