= Donegal East (Dáil constituency) =

Dáil constituency (1937–1961)

- Former Dáil constituency

Former constituency
- Created: 1937
- Abolished: 1961
- Seats: 4
- Local government area: County Donegal
- Replaced by: Donegal North-East; Donegal South-West

Donegal East was a parliamentary constituency represented in Dáil Éireann, the lower house of the Irish parliament or Oireachtas from 1937 to 1961. The constituency elected 4 deputies (Teachtaí Dála, commonly known as TDs) to the Dáil, on the system of proportional representation by means of the single transferable vote (PR-STV).

== History ==
The constituency was created under the Electoral (Revision of Constituencies) Act 1935, for the 1937 general election to Dáil Éireann. It succeeded the constituency of Donegal. It was abolished under the Electoral (Amendment) Act 1961, when it and Donegal West were replaced by the new constituencies of Donegal North-East and Donegal South-West.

== Boundaries ==
It consisted of the administrative county of Donegal except the portion thereof which was comprised in the county constituency of Donegal West.

== TDs ==
Teachtaí Dála (TDs) for Donegal East 1937–1961
Key to parties: CnaT = Clann na Talmhan; FF = Fianna Fáil; FG = Fine Gael; Ind. = Independent
Dáil	Election	Deputy (Party)	Deputy (Party)	Deputy (Party)	Deputy (Party)
9th	1937	John Friel (FF)	Neal Blaney (FF)	James Myles (Ind.)	Daniel McMenamin (FG)
10th	1938	John Friel (FF)	Henry McDevitt (FF)	James Myles (Ind.)	Daniel McMenamin (FG)
11th	1943	John Friel (FF)	Neal Blaney (FF)	William Sheldon (CnaT)	Daniel McMenamin (FG)
12th	1944	John Friel (FF)	Neal Blaney (FF)	William Sheldon (Ind.)	Daniel McMenamin (FG)
13th	1948	John Friel (FF)	Neal Blaney (FF)	William Sheldon (Ind.)	Daniel McMenamin (FG)
13th	1948 by-election	John Friel (FF)	Neil Blaney (FF)	William Sheldon (Ind.)	Daniel McMenamin (FG)
14th	1951	Liam Cunningham (FF)	Neil Blaney (FF)	William Sheldon (Ind.)	Daniel McMenamin (FG)
15th	1954	Liam Cunningham (FF)	Neil Blaney (FF)	William Sheldon (Ind.)	Daniel McMenamin (FG)
16th	1957	Liam Cunningham (FF)	Neil Blaney (FF)	William Sheldon (Ind.)	Daniel McMenamin (FG)
17th	1961	Constituency abolished. See Donegal North-East and Donegal South-West			

Note: The columns in this table are used only for presentational purposes, and no significance should be attached to the order of columns. For details of the order in which seats were won at each election, see the detailed results of that election.

== Elections ==
*: Outgoing TD

=== 1957 general election ===
1957 general election: Donegal East
Party	Candidate	FPv%	Count			
Party	Candidate	FPv%	1	2	3	4
Fianna Fáil	Neil Blaney	27.9	8,693			
Fianna Fáil	Liam Cunningham	19.9	6,188	8,424		
Independent	William Sheldon	19.3	6,011	6,033	6,060	6,092
Fine Gael	Daniel McMenamin	16.4	5,098	5,196	5,442	7,137
Independent	Frank Morris	10.3	3,216	3,309	3,650	3,722
Fine Gael	Patrick Doherty	6.2	1,914	1,933	1,969	
Electorate: 42,751 Valid: 31,120 Quota: 6,225 Turnout: 72.8%

=== 1954 general election ===
1954 general election: Donegal East
Party	Candidate	FPv%	Count				
Party	Candidate	FPv%	1	2	3	4	5
Fianna Fáil	Neil Blaney	25.9	8,538				
Fine Gael	Daniel McMenamin	19.2	6,330	6,399	6,405	6,762	
Independent	William Sheldon	17.5	5,762	5,780	5,784	5,816	6,137
Fianna Fáil	Liam Cunningham	16.3	5,359	7,061			
Fine Gael	James McEleney	11.4	3,755	3,768	3,774	3,859	4,014
Fianna Fáil	Hugh McCauley	7.7	2,526	2,652	3,099	3,160	
Independent	John Nugent	2.1	700	715	718		
Electorate: 44,100 Valid: 32,970 Quota: 6,595 Turnout: 74.8%

=== 1951 general election ===
1951 general election: Donegal East
Party	Candidate	FPv%	Count			
Party	Candidate	FPv%	1	2	3	4
Fianna Fáil	Neil Blaney	30.0	10,325			
Fine Gael	Daniel McMenamin	18.7	6,432	6,527	6,934	
Independent	William Sheldon	17.5	6,016	6,035	6,087	7,084
Fianna Fáil	John Friel	13.2	4,561	5,211	5,280	5,425
Fianna Fáil	Liam Cunningham	9.3	3,214	5,845	5,947	6,009
Fine Gael	John McEleney	8.7	3,020	3,035	3,123	
Labour	John Joseph Nugent	2.5	868	895		
Electorate: 45,742 Valid: 34,436 Quota: 6,888 Turnout: 75.3%

=== 1948 by-election ===
Following the death of Fianna Fáil TD Neal Blaney, a by-election was held on 7 December 1948. The seat was won by the Fianna Fáil candidate Neil Blaney, son of the deceased TD.

1948 by-election: Donegal East
Party	Candidate	FPv%	Count
Party	Candidate	FPv%	1
Fianna Fáil	Neil Blaney	55.5	19,570
Fine Gael	Joseph McGinley	40.4	14,250
Clann na Poblachta	James O'Donnell	4.0	1,435
Electorate: 48,204 Valid: 35,255 Quota: 17,628 Turnout: 73.1%

=== 1948 general election ===
1948 general election: Donegal East
Party	Candidate	FPv%	Count					
Party	Candidate	FPv%	1	2	3	4	5	6
Fianna Fáil	Neal Blaney	23.9	8,291					
Independent	William Sheldon	16.8	5,820	5,832	5,838	5,908	6,181	6,515
Fine Gael	Daniel McMenamin	16.5	5,733	5,785	5,807	7,521		
Fianna Fáil	John Friel	14.8	5,153	5,439	5,483	5,518	5,559	5,781
Fianna Fáil	James N. Doherty	10.8	3,756	4,654	4,762	4,774	4,789	5,012
Clann na Poblachta	Seán McCool	9.3	3,217	3,242	3,923	3,974	4,222	
Fine Gael	John McLoughlin	5.5	1,912	1,918	1,932			
Clann na Poblachta	Hugh Diver	2.4	833	901				
Electorate: 48,184 Valid: 34,715 Quota: 6,944 Turnout: 72.1%

=== 1944 general election ===
1944 general election: Donegal East
Party	Candidate	FPv%	Count					
Party	Candidate	FPv%	1	2	3	4	5	6
Fianna Fáil	Neal Blaney	23.7	7,828					
Fianna Fáil	John Friel	19.4	6,417	7,353				
Fine Gael	Daniel McMenamin	18.6	6,126	6,181	6,212	7,717		
Fianna Fáil	Daniel McGlinchey	12.0	3,974	4,179	4,811	4,929	4,966	5,048
Independent	William Sheldon	11.8	3,887	3,895	3,903	3,954	4,346	6,598
Independent	James Myles	8.8	2,904	2,916	2,966	3,009	3,161	
Fine Gael	James McCormack	5.7	1,876	1,885	1,914			
Electorate: 49,410 Valid: 33,012 Quota: 6,603 Turnout: 66.8%

=== 1943 general election ===
1943 general election: Donegal East
Party	Candidate	FPv%	Count							
Party	Candidate	FPv%	1	2	3	4	5	6	7	8
Fianna Fáil	Neal Blaney	22.0	7,576							
Fine Gael	Daniel McMenamin	17.3	5,970	5,998	6,689	7,254				
Fianna Fáil	John Friel	17.2	5,916	6,418	6,586	6,825	6,858	7,253		
Independent	James Myles	10.4	3,595	3,599	3,676	3,735	3,762	3,795	3,807	3,851
Clann na Talmhan	William Sheldon	9.8	3,373	3,378	3,588	3,687	3,771	3,946	3,949	4,167
Fianna Fáil	Daniel McGlinchey	7.6	2,637	2,738	2,776	3,020	3,057	3,497	3,619	
Independent	Seán McCool	5.7	1,961	1,976	2,041	2,554	2,635			
Labour	John McElhinney	5.5	1,907	1,924	1,996					
Independent	Manus Harkin	4.5	1,537	1,546						
Electorate: 49,410 Valid: 34,472 Quota: 6,895 Turnout: 69.8%

=== 1938 general election ===
1938 general election: Donegal East
Party	Candidate	FPv%	Count			
Party	Candidate	FPv%	1	2	3	4
Independent	James Myles	20.9	7,846			
Fine Gael	Daniel McMenamin	20.8	7,797			
Fianna Fáil	Henry McDevitt	19.5	7,293	7,337	7,364	7,688
Fianna Fáil	John Friel	17.4	6,526	6,533	6,547	6,850
Fianna Fáil	Neal Blaney	17.0	6,368	6,402	6,423	6,615
Labour	Patrick Lynch	4.4	1,642	1,908	2,148	
Electorate: 48,507 Valid: 37,472 Quota: 7,495 Turnout: 77.3%

=== 1937 general election ===
1937 general election: Donegal East
Party	Candidate	FPv%	Count				
Party	Candidate	FPv%	1	2	3	4	5
Independent	James Myles	22.4	8,090				
Fianna Fáil	Neal Blaney	21.8	7,876				
Fianna Fáil	John Friel	16.0	5,783	5,789	6,292	6,406	6,516
Fianna Fáil	Henry McDevitt	14.1	5,093	5,099	5,230	5,285	5,341
Fine Gael	Daniel McMenamin	13.4	4,836	5,486	5,505	9,791	
Fine Gael	John McLoughlin	12.2	4,398	4,610	4,617		
Electorate: 48,975 Valid: 36,076 Quota: 7,216 Turnout: 73.7%

== See also ==
- Dáil constituencies
- Politics of the Republic of Ireland
- Historic Dáil constituencies
- Elections in the Republic of Ireland
