= Joseph McGinley =

Irish politician, general practitioner and surgeon (1894–1974)

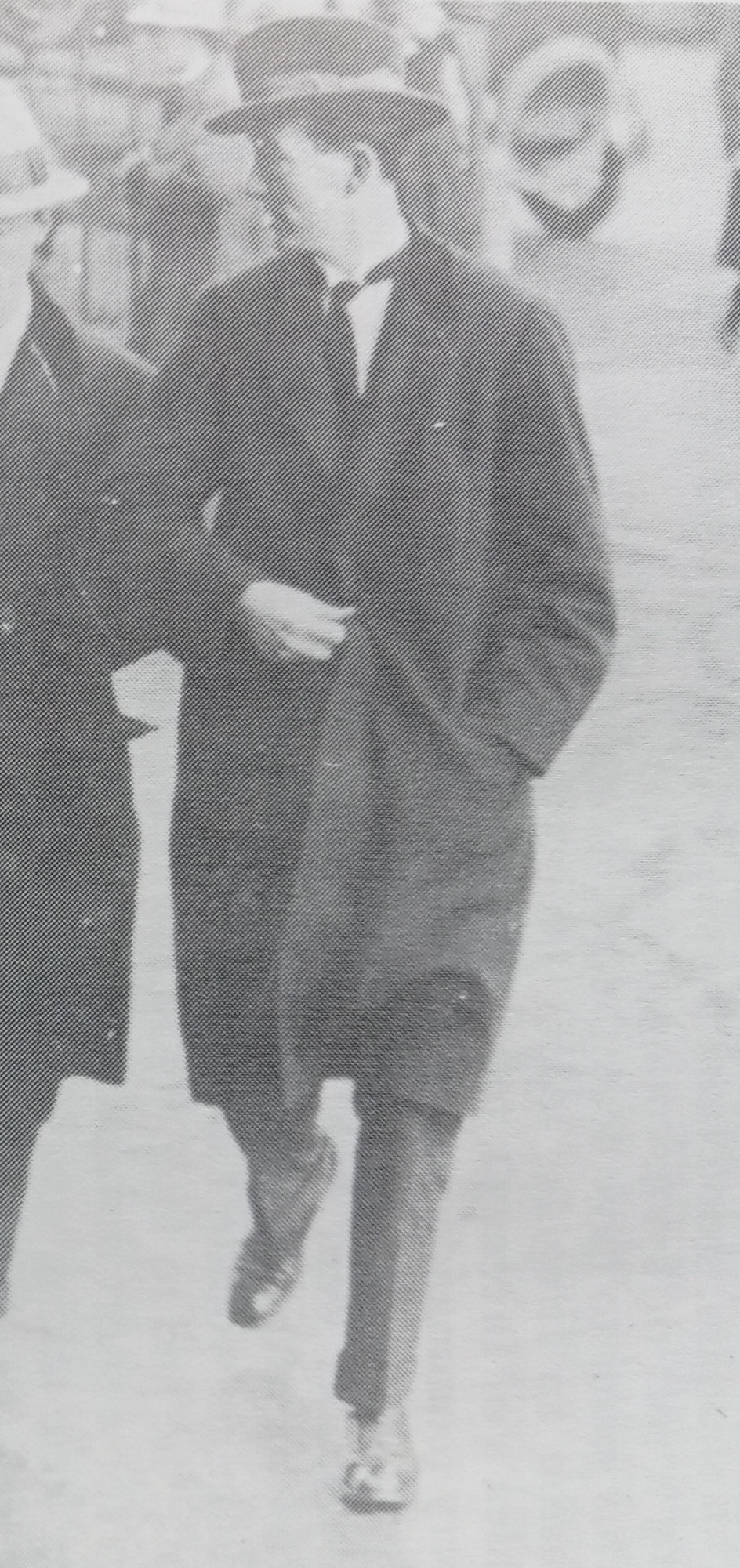
- McGinley in 1922

Teachta Dála
- In office May 1921 – August 1923
- Constituency: Donegal

Personal details
- Born: 1894 Breenagh. Letterkenny, County Donegal, Ireland
- Died: 1974 (aged 79–80) Letterkenny, County Donegal, Ireland
- Party: Sinn Féin; Cumann na nGaedheal; Fine Gael
- Spouse: Madeline Sweeney
- Education: Queen's University Belfast
- Profession: Medical practitioner, surgeon, politician

Joseph Patrick McGinley (1894–1974) was an Irish Sinn Féin, and later Fine Gael, politician, general practitioner and surgeon.

== Early life ==
He was born in Breenagh, Letterkenny in 1894. He was a nephew of Irish language author Peadar Toner Mac Fhionnlaoich (Cú Uladh) and of songwriter Michael McGinley. His father Pat Mc Ginley, had set up a branch of the land league in Glenswilly and as a passionate native Irish speaker was chairman of the Drombolg(Glenswilly) branch of the Gaelic league. He commenced the study of medicine in Queen's University Belfast in 1912, and qualified in 1916.

== Irish War of Independence ==
In 1917, McGinley set up a company of the Irish Volunteers in Letterkenny.

During the Irish War of Independence, he was arrested on 12 December 1919 for advocating the Sinn Féin loan at a meeting in Rosnakill, Fanad on 12 October. He was taken to Letterkenny and his case heard in Letterkenny Courthouse. Expecting trouble 40 British soldiers were moved to Letterkenny to bolster the local RIC. During the hearing a 'a large hostile crowd had gathered outside such was the popularity of Dr. McGinley.' An individual attempted to disable the Lorry which was to take the prisoners to Derry and when the lorry started a volunteer from Letterkenny shattered its windscreen with a hurl. He was put on trial in Derry but refused to recognise the court, saying no foreign court had the right to try him. He was sentenced and sent to Derry Jail, later transferred to Mountjoy Prison, and not released till May 1920.

=== Drumquin raid ===
As a member of the Irish Volunteers, McGinley was involved in the 26 August 1920 raid on the Royal Irish Constabulary (RIC) barracks in Drumquin, County Tyrone. One RIC constable was killed and another gravely wounded. The volunteers took their stock of weapons and had originally planned to burn the building. However, fearing the commotion caused by the shooting would mean the arrival of reinforcements from Omagh, they left.

The volunteers reached Letterkenny safely and stashed their much-needed guns and ammunition in their arms dump. McGinley was later visited by RIC district Inspector Walsh who told him that he'd been given a description of three men that had taken part in the raid and that McGinley fitted one of the descriptions. To McGinley's surprise, Walsh told him that he was working for Michael Collins (then Director of Intelligence for the IRA) and that he had given all the men alibis.

=== Fanad coast guard raid ===
Less than a month after the Drumquinn raid, Mc Ginley and two carloads of volunteers from Letterkenny attacked Fanad coastguard station under the cover of darkness and, after a short firefight, the soldiers manning it surrendered. Unfortunately, most of their arms had been only recently transferred to a ship anchored in the bay and the volunteers left with only a thousand rounds of ammunition, 9 revolvers and some other small arms.

== Anglo-Irish Truce ==
McGinley was elected unopposed as a pro–treaty Sinn Féin Teachta Dála (TD) to the Second Dáil at the 1921 elections for the Donegal constituency. He supported the Anglo-Irish Treaty and voted in favour of it. He took his opportunity at the treaty debates to address the assembly:

"It might be said that our men might have got better terms in London. Perhaps they might, but I can tell you that the people of Donegal anyhow have the greatest confidence in the ability of Arthur Griffith and the sincerity of Michael Collins; and they believe that taking all the circumstances of the case into account they did what was best for Ireland. Now president De Valera has stated that rather than sign this treaty he was prepared to see the Irish people live in subjugation until God would redeem them. I may as well say at once that that is not my creed; that is not a doctrine that ever was preached in the history of the world before: that a country, if it could not get absolutely what it was out for, should fight to the extermination of its people. I, as one man, can't take the responsibility for committing the men and women who sent me here to a war of extermination, which I think would result if this treaty were rejected. I have no qualms about the oath which I took in coming to the assembly; the people sent me here to get absolute separation if I could - I am for absolute separation if I could see a way out- but they sent me here to use my own free will; and if I could not get absolute separation at the present time I was to take something by which we could work out our own independence in the long run. I think in voting for this treaty I am voting according to the mandate which my constituents gave me when sending me here."

== Later life ==
He was elected unopposed as a Sinn Féin TD at the 1922 general election. He did not contest the 1923 general election, choosing to focus on his medical practice in Letterkenny, as he was the only surgeon in north-west Donegal then and until his retirement in the 1960s. He remained as chairman of Cumann na Gael and later Fine Gael Donegal East until the late 1960s. Paddy Harte referred to Mc Ginley as 'Mr Fine Gael' in Donegal.

He was county coroner for many decades, and presided over tragedies such as the Ballymanus mine disaster of 1943, the Owen Carrow viaduct disaster of 1925, and the Arranmore lifeboat tragedy of 1953.

In 1948, he was the Fine Gael candidate in the Donegal East by-election caused by the death of Neal Blaney. McGinley was up against the ill will of the substantial unionist population in east Donegal, who usually voted for Fine Gael, who were resentful of the recent repeal of the external relations act, which removed the King as the figurehead of the Irish state and made Ireland a republic, by the Government of the 13th Dáil. He was defeated by Blaney's son, Neil Blaney of Fianna Fáil, although he significantly increased the Fine Gael vote.

On a sporting level Mc Ginley was a former President of the Donegal boxing board, a former vice president of the Ulster GAA council and from the 1920s to the 1970s the GAA teams of east Donegal competed for the Dr Mc Ginley cup of the east Donegal Hospital League as it was than called.

== Personal life ==
He married Dr Madeline Sweeney of Sweeney's hotel, Dungloe, a first cousin of Joseph Sweeney.

They had 7 children including; Brian McGinley, former Vice President European Patent Office., Niall McGinley retired secondary school teacher, local historian and author, Joe Mc Ginley, former director of Conshu, a giant of the South African footwear manufacturing industry and Desmond Mc Ginley CM, former Vice President of St Marys University College, Strawberry Hill.

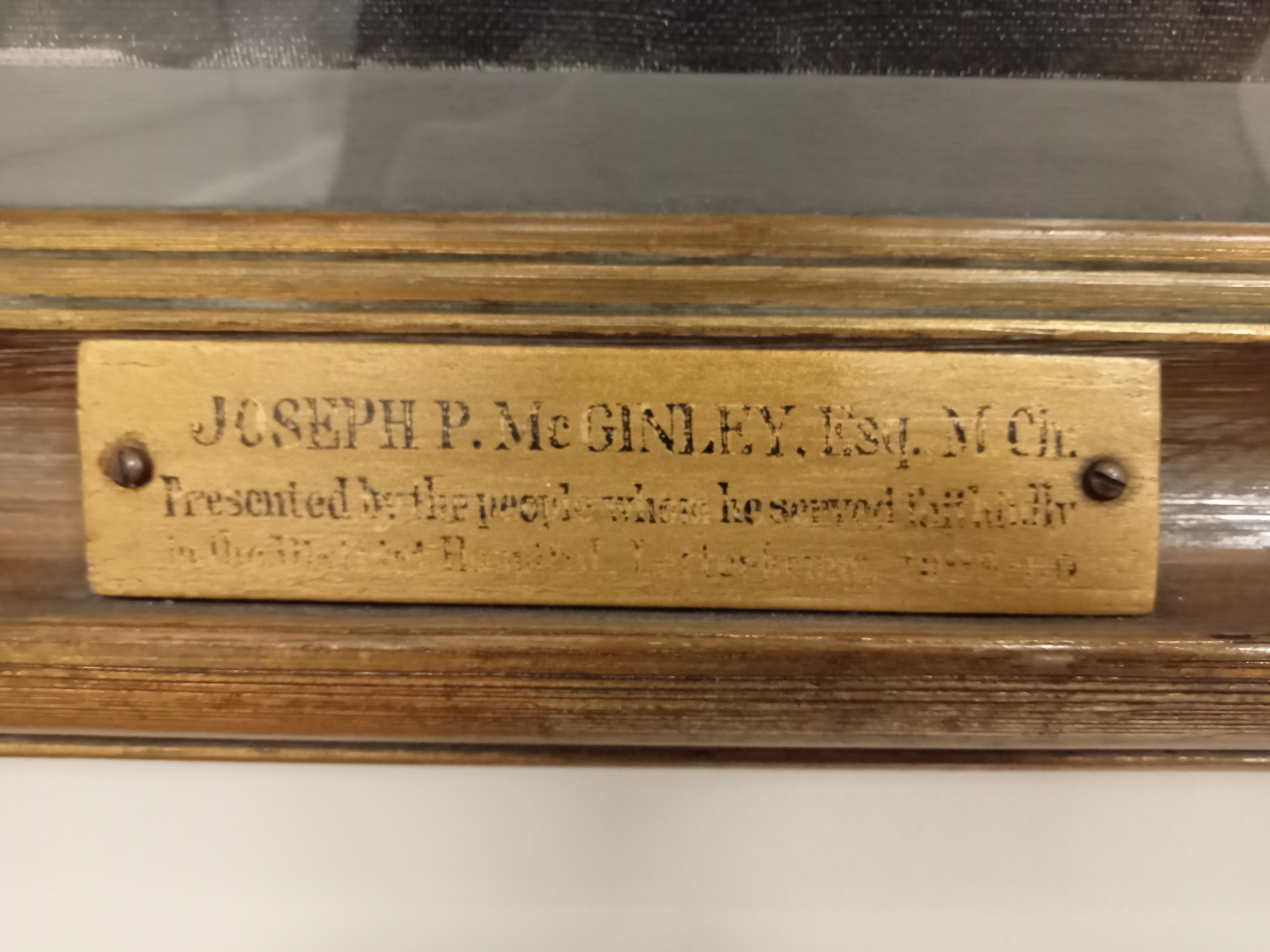
Inscription from Mc Ginley's portrait by Seán O' Sullivan paid by subscription of the people of Donegal. 'Presented by the people whom he served faithfully'.

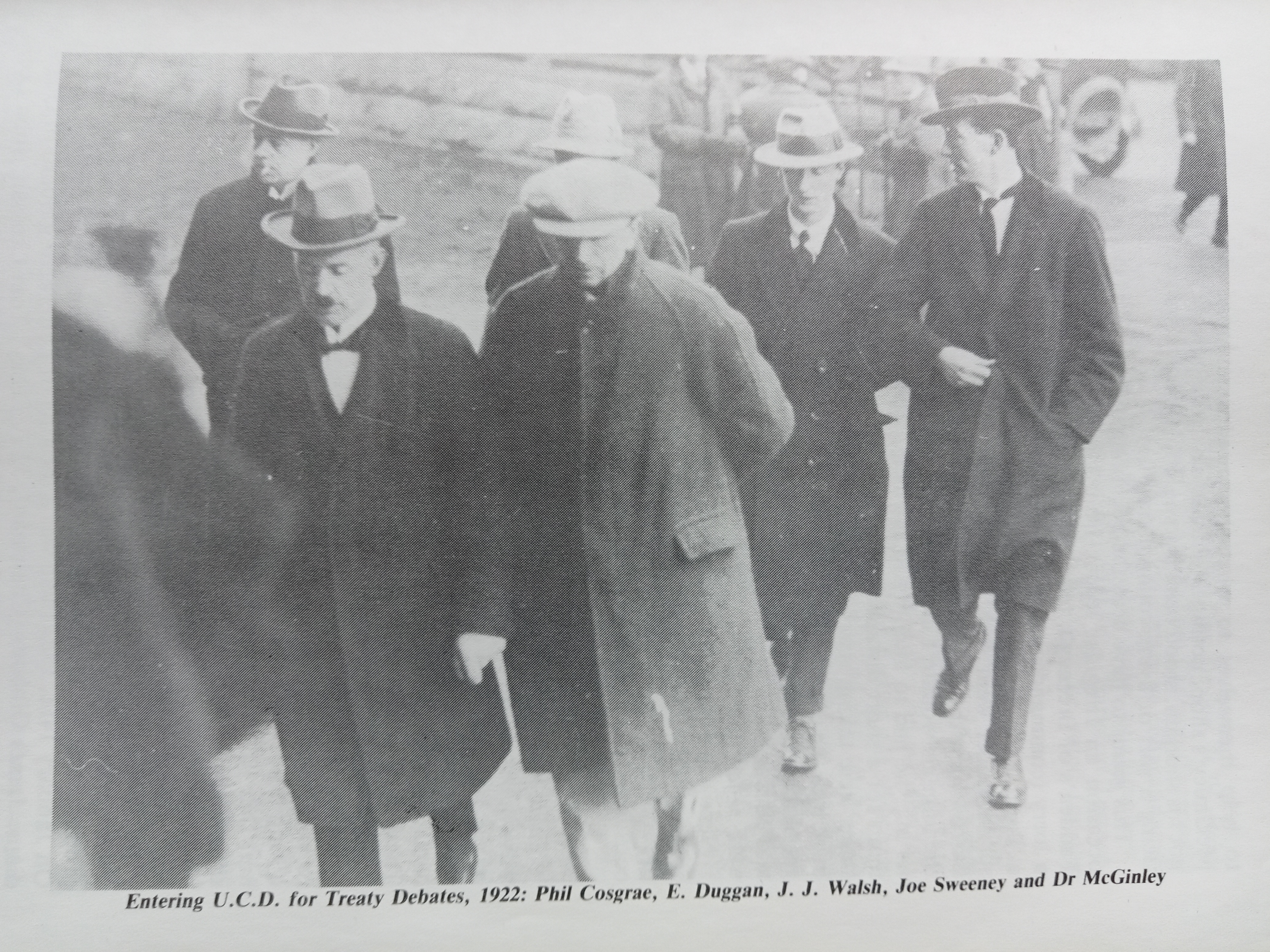
Entering UCD for the Treaty Debates, 1922. Phil Cosgrave, E. Duggan, J.J. Walsh, Joe Sweeney, and McGinley.

Dáil	Election	Deputy (Party)	Deputy (Party)	Deputy (Party)	Deputy (Party)	Deputy (Party)	Deputy (Party)	Deputy (Party)	Deputy (Party)
2nd	1921	Joseph O'Doherty (SF)	Samuel O'Flaherty (SF)	Patrick McGoldrick (SF)	Joseph McGinley (SF)	Joseph Sweeney (SF)	Peter Ward (SF)	6 seats 1921–1923	
3rd	1922	Joseph O'Doherty (AT-SF)	Samuel O'Flaherty (AT-SF)	Patrick McGoldrick (PT-SF)	Joseph McGinley (PT-SF)	Joseph Sweeney (PT-SF)	Peter Ward (PT-SF)	6 seats 1921–1923	
4th	1923	Joseph O'Doherty (Rep)	Peadar O'Donnell (Rep)	Patrick McGoldrick (CnaG)	Eugene Doherty (CnaG)	Patrick McFadden (CnaG)	Peter Ward (CnaG)	James Myles (Ind.)	John White (FP)
4th	1924 by-election	Joseph O'Doherty (Rep)	Peadar O'Donnell (Rep)	Patrick McGoldrick (CnaG)	Eugene Doherty (CnaG)	Patrick McFadden (CnaG)	Denis McCullough (CnaG)	James Myles (Ind.)	John White (FP)
5th	1927 (Jun)	Frank Carney (FF)	Neal Blaney (FF)	Daniel McMenamin (NL)	Eugene Doherty (CnaG)	Michael Óg McFadden (CnaG)	Hugh Law (CnaG)	James Myles (Ind.)	John White (FP)
6th	1927 (Sep)	Frank Carney (FF)	Neal Blaney (FF)	Archie Cassidy (Lab)	Eugene Doherty (CnaG)	Michael Óg McFadden (CnaG)	Hugh Law (CnaG)	James Myles (Ind.)	John White (FP)
7th	1932	Frank Carney (FF)	Neal Blaney (FF)	Brian Brady (FF)	Eugene Doherty (CnaG)	Daniel McMenamin (CnaG)	James Dillon (Ind.)	James Myles (Ind.)	John White (CnaG)
8th	1933	Joseph O'Doherty (FF)	Neal Blaney (FF)	Brian Brady (FF)	Hugh Doherty (FF)	Daniel McMenamin (CnaG)	James Dillon (NCP)	James Myles (Ind.)	Michael Óg McFadden (CnaG)
9th	1937	Constituency abolished. See Donegal East and Donegal West							

Dáil	Election	Deputy (Party)	Deputy (Party)	Deputy (Party)	Deputy (Party)	Deputy (Party)
21st	1977	Hugh Conaghan (FF)	Joseph Brennan (FF)	Neil Blaney (IFF)	James White (FG)	Paddy Harte (FG)
21st	1980 by-election	Hugh Conaghan (FF)	Clement Coughlan (FF)	Neil Blaney (IFF)	James White (FG)	Paddy Harte (FG)
22nd	1981	Constituency abolished. See Donegal North-East and Donegal South-West				

Dáil	Election	Deputy (Party)	Deputy (Party)	Deputy (Party)	Deputy (Party)	Deputy (Party)
32nd	2016	Pearse Doherty (SF)	Pat "the Cope" Gallagher (FF)	Thomas Pringle (Ind.)	Charlie McConalogue (FF)	Joe McHugh (FG)
33rd	2020	Pearse Doherty (SF)	Pádraig Mac Lochlainn (SF)	Thomas Pringle (Ind.)	Charlie McConalogue (FF)	Joe McHugh (FG)
34th	2024	Pearse Doherty (SF)	Pádraig Mac Lochlainn (SF)	Charles Ward (100%R)	Charlie McConalogue (FF)	Pat "the Cope" Gallagher (FF)
