= 1949 Cork West by-election =

By-election to the 13th Dáil

- 15 June 1949
- Turnout: 29,859 (81.4%)
	Murphy	Cotter
Nominee	William J. Murphy	Edward Cotter
Party	Labour	Fianna Fáil
First preferences	18,909	10,950
Percentage	63.3%	36.7%
TD before election
Timothy J. Murphy
Labour
TD after election
William J. Murphy
Labour

A Dáil by-election was held in the constituency of Cork West in Ireland on Wednesday, 15 June 1949, to fill a vacancy in the 13th Dáil. It followed the death of Labour Teachta Dála (TD) Timothy J. Murphy on 29 April 1949.

The writ of election to fill the vacancy was agreed by the Dáil on 24 May 1949.

The by-election was won by the Labour candidate William J. Murphy, son of the deceased TD, Timothy J. Murphy.

Aged 21 years and 29 days at the time, William J. Murphy is the youngest ever TD. Murphy did not contest the 1951 general election, and was never subsequently re-elected to the Dáil.

== Result ==
1949 Cork West by-election
Party	Candidate	FPv%	Count
Party	Candidate	FPv%	1
Labour	William J. Murphy	63.3	18,909
Fianna Fáil	Edward Cotter	36.7	10,950
Electorate: 36,699 Valid: 29,859 Quota: 14,930 Turnout: 81.4%
