= James Myles =

Irish soldier, politician and rugby union player (1877–1956)

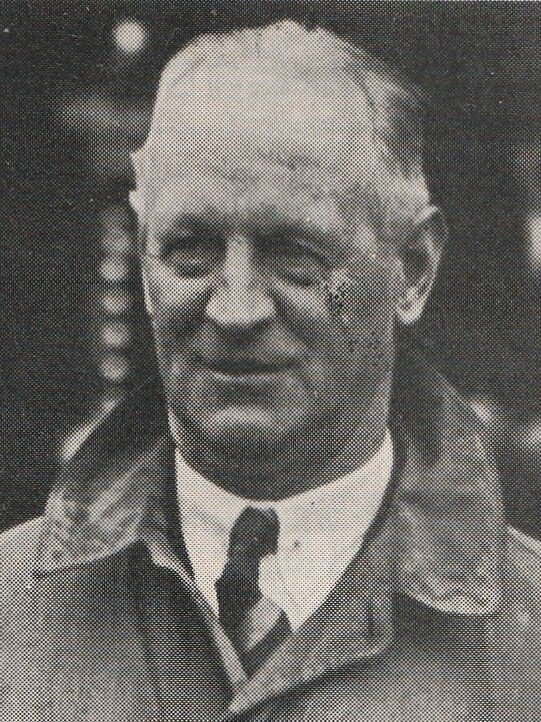
- Myles, c.1930s

Teachta Dála
- In office July 1937 – June 1943
- Constituency: Donegal East
- In office August 1923 – July 1937
- Constituency: Donegal

Personal details
- Born: 1877 County Donegal, Ireland
- Died: 13 February 1956 (aged 78–79) County Donegal, Ireland
- Party: Independent

Military service
- Branch/service: Royal Inniskilling Fusiliers; Royal Engineers
- Rank: Major
- Battles/wars: World War I

James Sproule Myles MC (1877 – 13 February 1956) was an Irish soldier, politician and rugby union player.

== Rugby player ==
Myles played rugby for City of Derry and Ireland. In October 1899, together with Arnold Harvey, he was a member of the Ireland team that went on a tour of Canada. This was their first ever overseas tour. While playing, he broke his leg and he had to remain in Canada until December while the rest of the touring party returned home in November.

== Soldier ==
During World War I, Myles served in the British Army with both the Royal Inniskilling Fusiliers and the Royal Engineers. He won the Military Cross for bravery and reached the rank of Major.

== Personal life ==
He was among a group of 40 Unionists kidnapped in February 1922. "Though apparently not an Orangeman, Myles was a Prince Mason in a chapter well stocked with Orange luminaries."

== Politician ==
Myles served as an Independent Teachta Dála (TD) in Dáil Éireann for twenty years. He was elected on his first attempt at the 1923 general election and was subsequently re-elected six times, winning the greatest number of first preferences in each of the seven elections. He initially represented Donegal, and sat for Donegal East when the 8-seat constituency was divided in 1937.

He lost his seat at the 1943 general election, and was defeated again at the 1944 general election.

He died in 1956 and is buried at St. Anne's Church in Ballyshannon, County Donegal.

Dáil	Election	Deputy (Party)	Deputy (Party)	Deputy (Party)	Deputy (Party)	Deputy (Party)	Deputy (Party)	Deputy (Party)	Deputy (Party)
2nd	1921	Joseph O'Doherty (SF)	Samuel O'Flaherty (SF)	Patrick McGoldrick (SF)	Joseph McGinley (SF)	Joseph Sweeney (SF)	Peter Ward (SF)	6 seats 1921–1923	
3rd	1922	Joseph O'Doherty (AT-SF)	Samuel O'Flaherty (AT-SF)	Patrick McGoldrick (PT-SF)	Joseph McGinley (PT-SF)	Joseph Sweeney (PT-SF)	Peter Ward (PT-SF)	6 seats 1921–1923	
4th	1923	Joseph O'Doherty (Rep)	Peadar O'Donnell (Rep)	Patrick McGoldrick (CnaG)	Eugene Doherty (CnaG)	Patrick McFadden (CnaG)	Peter Ward (CnaG)	James Myles (Ind.)	John White (FP)
4th	1924 by-election	Joseph O'Doherty (Rep)	Peadar O'Donnell (Rep)	Patrick McGoldrick (CnaG)	Eugene Doherty (CnaG)	Patrick McFadden (CnaG)	Denis McCullough (CnaG)	James Myles (Ind.)	John White (FP)
5th	1927 (Jun)	Frank Carney (FF)	Neal Blaney (FF)	Daniel McMenamin (NL)	Eugene Doherty (CnaG)	Michael Óg McFadden (CnaG)	Hugh Law (CnaG)	James Myles (Ind.)	John White (FP)
6th	1927 (Sep)	Frank Carney (FF)	Neal Blaney (FF)	Archie Cassidy (Lab)	Eugene Doherty (CnaG)	Michael Óg McFadden (CnaG)	Hugh Law (CnaG)	James Myles (Ind.)	John White (FP)
7th	1932	Frank Carney (FF)	Neal Blaney (FF)	Brian Brady (FF)	Eugene Doherty (CnaG)	Daniel McMenamin (CnaG)	James Dillon (Ind.)	James Myles (Ind.)	John White (CnaG)
8th	1933	Joseph O'Doherty (FF)	Neal Blaney (FF)	Brian Brady (FF)	Hugh Doherty (FF)	Daniel McMenamin (CnaG)	James Dillon (NCP)	James Myles (Ind.)	Michael Óg McFadden (CnaG)
9th	1937	Constituency abolished. See Donegal East and Donegal West							

Dáil	Election	Deputy (Party)	Deputy (Party)	Deputy (Party)	Deputy (Party)	Deputy (Party)
21st	1977	Hugh Conaghan (FF)	Joseph Brennan (FF)	Neil Blaney (IFF)	James White (FG)	Paddy Harte (FG)
21st	1980 by-election	Hugh Conaghan (FF)	Clement Coughlan (FF)	Neil Blaney (IFF)	James White (FG)	Paddy Harte (FG)
22nd	1981	Constituency abolished. See Donegal North-East and Donegal South-West				

Dáil	Election	Deputy (Party)	Deputy (Party)	Deputy (Party)	Deputy (Party)	Deputy (Party)
32nd	2016	Pearse Doherty (SF)	Pat "the Cope" Gallagher (FF)	Thomas Pringle (Ind.)	Charlie McConalogue (FF)	Joe McHugh (FG)
33rd	2020	Pearse Doherty (SF)	Pádraig Mac Lochlainn (SF)	Thomas Pringle (Ind.)	Charlie McConalogue (FF)	Joe McHugh (FG)
34th	2024	Pearse Doherty (SF)	Pádraig Mac Lochlainn (SF)	Charles Ward (100%R)	Charlie McConalogue (FF)	Pat "the Cope" Gallagher (FF)

Dáil	Election	Deputy (Party)	Deputy (Party)	Deputy (Party)	Deputy (Party)
9th	1937	John Friel (FF)	Neal Blaney (FF)	James Myles (Ind.)	Daniel McMenamin (FG)
10th	1938	John Friel (FF)	Henry McDevitt (FF)	James Myles (Ind.)	Daniel McMenamin (FG)
11th	1943	John Friel (FF)	Neal Blaney (FF)	William Sheldon (CnaT)	Daniel McMenamin (FG)
12th	1944	John Friel (FF)	Neal Blaney (FF)	William Sheldon (Ind.)	Daniel McMenamin (FG)
13th	1948	John Friel (FF)	Neal Blaney (FF)	William Sheldon (Ind.)	Daniel McMenamin (FG)
13th	1948 by-election	John Friel (FF)	Neil Blaney (FF)	William Sheldon (Ind.)	Daniel McMenamin (FG)
14th	1951	Liam Cunningham (FF)	Neil Blaney (FF)	William Sheldon (Ind.)	Daniel McMenamin (FG)
15th	1954	Liam Cunningham (FF)	Neil Blaney (FF)	William Sheldon (Ind.)	Daniel McMenamin (FG)
16th	1957	Liam Cunningham (FF)	Neil Blaney (FF)	William Sheldon (Ind.)	Daniel McMenamin (FG)
17th	1961	Constituency abolished. See Donegal North-East and Donegal South-West			
