= Peadar Toner Mac Fhionnlaoich =

Irish writer and politician (1856–1942)

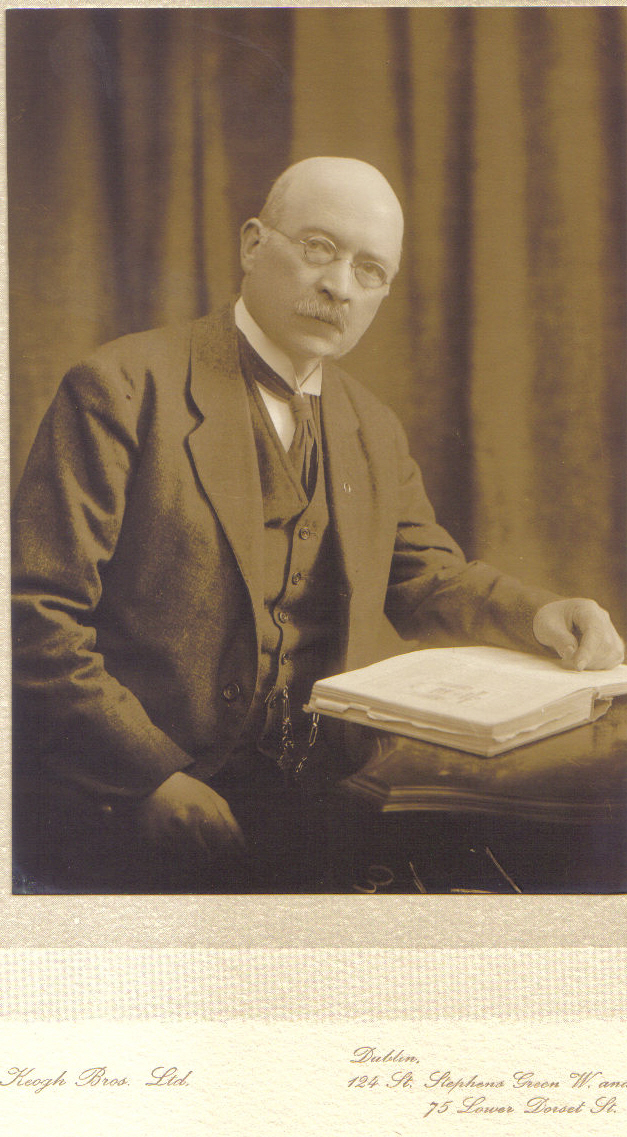
- Mac Fhionnlaoich, c. 1930s
- Born: Peter Toner McGinley; 5 October 1856; Allt an Iarainn, County Donegal, Ireland
- Died: 1 July 1942 (aged 85); Dublin, Ireland
- Resting place: Glasnevin Cemetery, Dublin
- Education: Blackrock College
- Spouse: Elizabeth Woods (m. 1895)
- Children: 12

Senator
- In office 27 April 1938 – 1 July 1942
- Constituency: Nominated by the Taoiseach

Personal details
- Party: Independent
- Writing career
- Pen name: Cú Uladh
- Language: Irish, English
- Genres: Short Story, Plays, Poems
- Subject: Irish Folklore
- Notable work: Bliain na hAiséirí (1992)
- Literary movement: Gaelic Revival

Peadar Toner Mac Fhionnlaoich (5 October 1856 – 1 July 1942; English: P.T. MacGinley), known as Cú Uladh (The Hound of Ulster), was an Irish language writer during the Gaelic revival. He wrote stories based on Irish folklore, some of the first Irish-language plays, and regular articles in most of the Irish language newspapers, such as An Claidheamh Soluis.

He is described along with Peadar Ua Laoghaire and Patrick S. Dinneen as the most prolific Irish language drama writers of the Irish language revival. His sons Eunan and Conor attended Patrick Pearse's school, St Enda's, and took part in the 1916 Easter Rising. He was the uncle of politician and surgeon Joseph McGinley Gairmscoil Chú Uladh, the Irish speaking secondary school for the Gaeltacht Láir in Donegal, is named after him.

== Background ==
He was born as Peter Toner McGinley in Alt an Iarainn, Gleann tSúilí, County Donegal to Micheal McGinley and Susan Toner in 1856. His sister Bridget Mc Ginley, was a poet who amongst other works penned the poem, 'the hills of Donegal'. He attended school locally until he was seventeen. He then attended Blackrock College in Dublin for two years. On leaving school he entered into the British Civil Service becoming an Inland Revenue officer. In 1895 he married Elizabeth Woods (Irish: Sibhéal Ní Uadhaigh) and they had twelve children. He spoke Irish from an early age and kept an interest in the language throughout his life, first publishing an Irish language short story and poem in The Donegal Christmas Annual 1883. It was not until 1895 while living in Belfast that he became involved in the Gaelic Movement.

== Conradh na Gaeilge ==
The first meeting of the Ulster branch of the Conradh na Gaeilge occurred in Mac Fhionnlaoich's house in 1895. From that point on, he became very involved in Conradh na Gaeilge. He became the organisation's president on several occasions, as did his son Diarmuid after him. He was, apart from Douglas Hyde, the longest serving president ever of Conradh na Gaeilge. He was a passionate supporter of Ulster Irish and set up Ardscoil Ultach in Belfast to teach Ulster Irish in response to Munster Irish which was dominant in the conradh at the time.

Along with others such as Seán Bán Mac Meanman was against the replacement of the clo gaelach by the Roman type, as he believed it would destroy the language.

His son Dubhglas, was a barrister and later a judge who was well known for arguing cases in Irish and wearing kilts to court.

== Seanad Éireann ==
Mac Fhionnlaoich was a member of Seanad Éireann from 1938 to 1942 when he was nominated by the Taoiseach Éamon de Valera. He spoke only Irish in the Seanad.

== Main works ==
- The Donegal Christmas Annual 1883 (ed.) – (Selection of short stories and poems in English and Irish from Donegal authors.)
- Miondrámanna (1902) – (Three mini plays)
- Handbook of Irish Teaching (1902)
- An Pléidseam (1903)
- Tá na Francaighe ar an Mhuir (1905) – (Play)
- An Léightheoir Gaedhealach (1907) – (Irish language reader)
- Eachtra Aodh Ruaidh Uí Dhomhnaill (1911) – (Folklore)
- Conchubhar Mac Neasa (1914) – (Folklore)
- Ciall na Sean-Ráidhte (1914). Republished as: Ciall na Seanráite (1992). New edition edited by Seán Mac Aindreasa.
- An Cogadh Dearg agus Scéalta Eile (1918) – (Short stories)
- Scríobhnóirí Móra Chúige Uladh 1530–1750 (1925) – (Authors of Ulster)
- Bliain na hAiséirí (1992). Edited by Éamon Ó Ciosáin – (1916 Easter Rising)
