= John Friel =

Irish politician and merchant (1889–1963)

Teachta Dála
- In office July 1937 – May 1951
- Constituency: Donegal East

Personal details
- Born: 1 August 1889 County Donegal, Ireland
- Died: 1 October 1963 (aged 74) County Donegal, Ireland
- Party: Fianna Fáil

John Friel (1 August 1889 – 1 October 1963) was an Irish Fianna Fáil politician and merchant. He was elected to Dáil Éireann as a Fianna Fáil Teachta Dála (TD) for the Donegal East constituency at the 1937 general election. He was re-elected at each subsequent election until he lost his seat at the 1951 general election.

Dáil	Election	Deputy (Party)	Deputy (Party)	Deputy (Party)	Deputy (Party)
9th	1937	John Friel (FF)	Neal Blaney (FF)	James Myles (Ind.)	Daniel McMenamin (FG)
10th	1938	John Friel (FF)	Henry McDevitt (FF)	James Myles (Ind.)	Daniel McMenamin (FG)
11th	1943	John Friel (FF)	Neal Blaney (FF)	William Sheldon (CnaT)	Daniel McMenamin (FG)
12th	1944	John Friel (FF)	Neal Blaney (FF)	William Sheldon (Ind.)	Daniel McMenamin (FG)
13th	1948	John Friel (FF)	Neal Blaney (FF)	William Sheldon (Ind.)	Daniel McMenamin (FG)
13th	1948 by-election	John Friel (FF)	Neil Blaney (FF)	William Sheldon (Ind.)	Daniel McMenamin (FG)
14th	1951	Liam Cunningham (FF)	Neil Blaney (FF)	William Sheldon (Ind.)	Daniel McMenamin (FG)
15th	1954	Liam Cunningham (FF)	Neil Blaney (FF)	William Sheldon (Ind.)	Daniel McMenamin (FG)
16th	1957	Liam Cunningham (FF)	Neil Blaney (FF)	William Sheldon (Ind.)	Daniel McMenamin (FG)
17th	1961	Constituency abolished. See Donegal North-East and Donegal South-West			
