= Cormac McGinley =

Irish Gaelic footballer

Personal information
- Native name: Cormac Mac Fhionnlaoich (Irish)
- Born: County Tyrone, Northern Ireland
- Height: 6 ft 2 in (188 cm)

Sport
- Sport: Gaelic football
- Position: Half back
Club
- Years: Club
- ? -?: Errigal Ciarán
Club titles
- Tyrone titles: 2
- Ulster titles: 1
Inter-county
- Years: County
- ?- ?: Tyrone
Inter-county titles
- Ulster titles: 3
- All-Irelands: 1
- NFL: 1

Cormac McGinley is a former Gaelic footballer who played for the Errigal Ciarán club and the Tyrone county team. He was a member of Tyrone's 2003 All-Ireland and league winning panel, although he took no part in the final. McGinley played his club football alongside Tyrone's Peter Canavan, winning two Tyrone Senior Football Championships and the Ulster Senior Football Championship.
