= William J. Murphy (Labour politician) =

Irish politician (1928–2018)

Teachta Dála
- In office June 1949 – May 1951
- Constituency: Cork West

Personal details
- Born: 17 May 1928 County Cork, Ireland
- Died: 17 September 2018 (aged 90) County Cork, Ireland
- Party: Labour Party
- Parent: Timothy J. Murphy (father)

William J. Murphy (17 May 1928 – 17 September 2018) was an Irish Labour Party politician.

He was elected as a Labour Party Teachta Dála (TD) for the Cork West constituency at the 1949 by-election on 15 June. His father, Timothy J. Murphy, the sitting TD and Minister for Local Government, had died on 29 April 1949. Aged 21 years and 29 days at the time, he is the youngest ever TD.

Following his election to the Dáil, he was elected to the administrative council of the Labour Party. In his maiden speech, he asked for government contribution to rural development schemes to be increased from 75 percent in cases where small farmers could not afford to provide the remaining 25 percent towards costs. Murphy was elected as a vice-president of Carbery Show Society in February 1950. He did not contest the 1951 general election. He later worked for Cork County Council.

He died on 18 September 2018.

Honorary titles
Preceded by Neil Blaney	Baby of the Dáil; 1949–1951	Succeeded by Declan Costello

Dáil	Election	Deputy (Party)	Deputy (Party)	Deputy (Party)	Deputy (Party)	Deputy (Party)
4th	1923	Timothy J. Murphy (Lab)	Seán Buckley (Rep)	Cornelius Connolly (CnaG)	John Prior (CnaG)	Timothy O'Donovan (FP)
5th	1927 (Jun)	Timothy J. Murphy (Lab)	Thomas Mullins (FF)	Timothy Sheehy (CnaG)	Jasper Wolfe (Ind.)	Timothy O'Donovan (FP)
6th	1927 (Sep)	Timothy J. Murphy (Lab)	Thomas Mullins (FF)	Timothy Sheehy (CnaG)	Jasper Wolfe (Ind.)	Timothy O'Donovan (FP)
7th	1932	Timothy J. Murphy (Lab)	Raphael Keyes (FF)	Eamonn O'Neill (CnaG)	Jasper Wolfe (Ind.)	Timothy O'Donovan (FP)
8th	1933	Timothy J. Murphy (Lab)	Tom Hales (FF)	Eamonn O'Neill (CnaG)	James Burke (CnaG)	Timothy O'Donovan (NCP)
9th	1937	Timothy J. Murphy (Lab)	Timothy O'Sullivan (FF)	Daniel O'Leary (FG)	Eamonn O'Neill (FG)	Timothy O'Donovan (FG)
10th	1938	Timothy J. Murphy (Lab)	Timothy O'Sullivan (FF)	Seán Buckley (FF)	Eamonn O'Neill (FG)	Timothy O'Donovan (FG)
11th	1943	Timothy J. Murphy (Lab)	Timothy O'Sullivan (FF)	Seán Buckley (FF)	Patrick O'Driscoll (Ind.)	Timothy O'Donovan (FG)
12th	1944	Timothy J. Murphy (Lab)	Timothy O'Sullivan (FF)	Seán Buckley (FF)	Patrick O'Driscoll (Ind.)	Eamonn O'Neill (FG)
13th	1948	Timothy J. Murphy (Lab)	Timothy O'Sullivan (FF)	Seán Collins (FG)	3 seats 1948–1961	
13th	1949 by-election	William J. Murphy (Lab)	Timothy O'Sullivan (FF)	Seán Collins (FG)	3 seats 1948–1961	
14th	1951	Michael Pat Murphy (Lab)	Timothy O'Sullivan (FF)	Seán Collins (FG)	3 seats 1948–1961	
15th	1954	Michael Pat Murphy (Lab)	Edward Cotter (FF)	Seán Collins (FG)	3 seats 1948–1961	
16th	1957	Michael Pat Murphy (Lab)	Edward Cotter (FF)	Florence Wycherley (Ind.)	3 seats 1948–1961	
17th	1961	Constituency abolished. See Cork South-West				
