= William Sheldon (Irish politician) =

Irish politician (1907–1999)

Senator
- In office 14 December 1961 – 1 June 1973
- Constituency: Nominated by the Taoiseach

Teachta Dála
- In office June 1943 – October 1961
- Constituency: Donegal East

Personal details
- Born: 18 January 1907 Derry, Ireland
- Died: 1 November 1999 (aged 92) County Donegal, Ireland
- Party: Independent
- Other political affiliations: Clann na Talmhan
- Spouse: Margaret Whyte (m. 1942)
- Education: Queen's University Belfast

William Alexander Watson Sheldon (18 January 1907 – 1 November 1999) was an Irish politician and farmer. From a protestant background, he was educated at Foyle College and Queen's University Belfast.

He was elected to Dáil Éireann at the 1943 general election as a Clann na Talmhan Teachta Dála (TD) for the Donegal East constituency. He was re-elected as an independent TD at the 1944, 1948, 1951, 1954 and 1957 general elections. He did not contest the 1961 general election.

When tributes were paid to him in the Seanad after his death, it was said that this was because the constituency was reduced from 4 to 3 seats. (Note: The four-seat Donegal East was abolished and the three-seat Donegal North-East was created.) In 1961, he was nominated by the Taoiseach, Seán Lemass to the 10th Seanad. He was re-nominated to the Seanad in 1965 and 1969, and he retired from politics in 1973. He was also a member of Donegal County Council from 1945 to 1955.

== Notes ==
Dáil	Election	Deputy (Party)	Deputy (Party)	Deputy (Party)	Deputy (Party)
9th	1937	John Friel (FF)	Neal Blaney (FF)	James Myles (Ind.)	Daniel McMenamin (FG)
10th	1938	John Friel (FF)	Henry McDevitt (FF)	James Myles (Ind.)	Daniel McMenamin (FG)
11th	1943	John Friel (FF)	Neal Blaney (FF)	William Sheldon (CnaT)	Daniel McMenamin (FG)
12th	1944	John Friel (FF)	Neal Blaney (FF)	William Sheldon (Ind.)	Daniel McMenamin (FG)
13th	1948	John Friel (FF)	Neal Blaney (FF)	William Sheldon (Ind.)	Daniel McMenamin (FG)
13th	1948 by-election	John Friel (FF)	Neil Blaney (FF)	William Sheldon (Ind.)	Daniel McMenamin (FG)
14th	1951	Liam Cunningham (FF)	Neil Blaney (FF)	William Sheldon (Ind.)	Daniel McMenamin (FG)
15th	1954	Liam Cunningham (FF)	Neil Blaney (FF)	William Sheldon (Ind.)	Daniel McMenamin (FG)
16th	1957	Liam Cunningham (FF)	Neil Blaney (FF)	William Sheldon (Ind.)	Daniel McMenamin (FG)
17th	1961	Constituency abolished. See Donegal North-East and Donegal South-West			
