= Neal Blaney =

Irish politician (1893–1948)

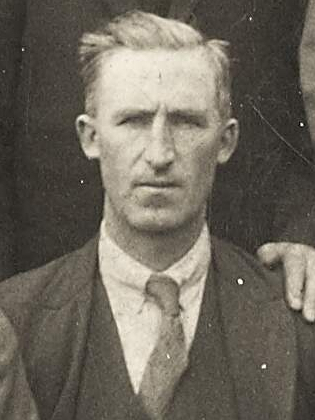
- Blaney in 1927

Teachta Dála
- In office June 1943 – 30 October 1948
- In office July 1937 – June 1938
- Constituency: Donegal East
- In office June 1927 – July 1937
- Constituency: Donegal

Senator
- In office 7 September 1938 – 23 June 1943
- Constituency: Agricultural Panel

Personal details
- Born: 5 November 1889 Rosnakill, County Donegal, Ireland
- Died: 30 October 1948 (aged 58) County Donegal, Ireland
- Party: Fianna Fáil
- Spouse: Nora Sweeney
- Children: 11, including Neil and Harry
- Relatives: Niall Blaney (grandson)

Military service
- Allegiance: Irish Volunteers; Irish Republican Army; Anti-Treaty IRA
- Years of service: 1919–1923
- Battles/wars: Irish War of Independence; Irish Civil War

Neal Blaney (5 November 1889 – 30 October 1948) was an Irish Fianna Fáil politician, and long-serving member of the Oireachtas.

== Early life and revolutionary period ==
Neal Blaney was born in Rosnakill, County Donegal, the fifth of six children of William Blaney, a small farmer, and Anna Blaney (née Sweeney). In 1913 Blaney joined the Irish Volunteers in Rosnakill and in 1914 was appointed company captain. He was the first president of the Rosnakill branch of Sinn Féin (founded 1916), and was active in Joseph O'Doherty's 1918 general election campaign. In 1920 he was appointed officer in charge of the Fanad Battalion, 1st Northern Division of the Irish Republican Army (IRA). Arrested on 18 March 1921, Blaney was sentenced to seven years penal servitude and imprisoned at Durham Prison, England until his release in January 1922 following the signing of the Anglo-Irish Treaty.

During the Irish Civil War, Blaney was second-in-command of Anti-Treaty IRA Donegal No. 2 Brigade before being captured by Free State forces in December 1922. His death sentence for possession of a firearm was commuted after the ceasefire order, and he was released in June 1924. Blaney was later awarded a pension by the Irish government under the Military Service Pensions Act, 1934 for his service with the Irish Volunteers and the IRA between 1917 and 1923.

== Politics ==
He was first elected as a Teachta Dála (TD) to the 5th Dáil for the Donegal constituency at the June 1927 general election. He retained his seat at subsequent general elections until it was abolished in boundary changes for the 1937 general election when he was returned for the new Donegal East constituency. He lost his seat at the 1938 general election, and was elected to the 3rd Seanad on the Agricultural Panel, serving until 1943.

He returned to 11th Dáil at the 1943 general election, and was re-elected at the 1944 general election. In early October 1948 he was diagnosed as suffering from cancer, and died on 30 October 1948, after being returned to the 13th Dáil at the 1948 general election. In the resulting by-election on 7 December 1948, his son Neil Blaney was elected as a TD for Donegal East.

Blaney was a director of the Milford Bakery Company, and also of the Donegal Bacon Company, Letterkenny, which he was instrumental in founding.

Another son, Harry Blaney, and Harry's son Niall Blaney, were later elected as TDs for the Donegal North-East constituency.

== See also ==
- Families in the Oireachtas

| Dáil | Election | Deputy (Party) | Deputy (Party) | Deputy (Party) | Deputy (Party) | Deputy (Party) | Deputy (Party) | Deputy (Party) | Deputy (Party) |
|---|---|---|---|---|---|---|---|---|---|
| 2nd | 1921 | Joseph O'Doherty (SF) | Samuel O'Flaherty (SF) | Patrick McGoldrick (SF) | Joseph McGinley (SF) | Joseph Sweeney (SF) | Peter Ward (SF) | 6 seats 1921–1923 | |
| 3rd | 1922 | Joseph O'Doherty (AT-SF) | Samuel O'Flaherty (AT-SF) | Patrick McGoldrick (PT-SF) | Joseph McGinley (PT-SF) | Joseph Sweeney (PT-SF) | Peter Ward (PT-SF) | 6 seats 1921–1923 | |
| 4th | 1923 | Joseph O'Doherty (Rep) | Peadar O'Donnell (Rep) | Patrick McGoldrick (CnaG) | Eugene Doherty (CnaG) | Patrick McFadden (CnaG) | Peter Ward (CnaG) | James Myles (Ind.) | John White (FP) |
| 4th | 1924 by-election | Joseph O'Doherty (Rep) | Peadar O'Donnell (Rep) | Patrick McGoldrick (CnaG) | Eugene Doherty (CnaG) | Patrick McFadden (CnaG) | Denis McCullough (CnaG) | James Myles (Ind.) | John White (FP) |
| 5th | 1927 (Jun) | Frank Carney (FF) | Neal Blaney (FF) | Daniel McMenamin (NL) | Eugene Doherty (CnaG) | Michael Óg McFadden (CnaG) | Hugh Law (CnaG) | James Myles (Ind.) | John White (FP) |
| 6th | 1927 (Sep) | Frank Carney (FF) | Neal Blaney (FF) | Archie Cassidy (Lab) | Eugene Doherty (CnaG) | Michael Óg McFadden (CnaG) | Hugh Law (CnaG) | James Myles (Ind.) | John White (FP) |
| 7th | 1932 | Frank Carney (FF) | Neal Blaney (FF) | Brian Brady (FF) | Eugene Doherty (CnaG) | Daniel McMenamin (CnaG) | James Dillon (Ind.) | James Myles (Ind.) | John White (CnaG) |
| 8th | 1933 | Joseph O'Doherty (FF) | Neal Blaney (FF) | Brian Brady (FF) | Hugh Doherty (FF) | Daniel McMenamin (CnaG) | James Dillon (NCP) | James Myles (Ind.) | Michael Óg McFadden (CnaG) |
| 9th | 1937 | Constituency abolished. See Donegal East and Donegal West | | | | | | | |

| Dáil | Election | Deputy (Party) | Deputy (Party) | Deputy (Party) | Deputy (Party) | Deputy (Party) |
|---|---|---|---|---|---|---|
| 21st | 1977 | Hugh Conaghan (FF) | Joseph Brennan (FF) | Neil Blaney (IFF) | James White (FG) | Paddy Harte (FG) |
| 21st | 1980 by-election | Hugh Conaghan (FF) | Clement Coughlan (FF) | Neil Blaney (IFF) | James White (FG) | Paddy Harte (FG) |
| 22nd | 1981 | Constituency abolished. See Donegal North-East and Donegal South-West | | | | |

| Dáil | Election | Deputy (Party) | Deputy (Party) | Deputy (Party) | Deputy (Party) | Deputy (Party) |
|---|---|---|---|---|---|---|
| 32nd | 2016 | Pearse Doherty (SF) | Pat "the Cope" Gallagher (FF) | Thomas Pringle (Ind.) | Charlie McConalogue (FF) | Joe McHugh (FG) |
| 33rd | 2020 | Pearse Doherty (SF) | Pádraig Mac Lochlainn (SF) | Thomas Pringle (Ind.) | Charlie McConalogue (FF) | Joe McHugh (FG) |
| 34th | 2024 | Pearse Doherty (SF) | Pádraig Mac Lochlainn (SF) | Charles Ward (100%R) | Charlie McConalogue (FF) | Pat "the Cope" Gallagher (FF) |

| Dáil | Election | Deputy (Party) | Deputy (Party) | Deputy (Party) | Deputy (Party) |
|---|---|---|---|---|---|
| 9th | 1937 | John Friel (FF) | Neal Blaney (FF) | James Myles (Ind.) | Daniel McMenamin (FG) |
| 10th | 1938 | John Friel (FF) | Henry McDevitt (FF) | James Myles (Ind.) | Daniel McMenamin (FG) |
| 11th | 1943 | John Friel (FF) | Neal Blaney (FF) | William Sheldon (CnaT) | Daniel McMenamin (FG) |
| 12th | 1944 | John Friel (FF) | Neal Blaney (FF) | William Sheldon (Ind.) | Daniel McMenamin (FG) |
| 13th | 1948 | John Friel (FF) | Neal Blaney (FF) | William Sheldon (Ind.) | Daniel McMenamin (FG) |
| 13th | 1948 by-election | John Friel (FF) | Neil Blaney (FF) | William Sheldon (Ind.) | Daniel McMenamin (FG) |
| 14th | 1951 | Liam Cunningham (FF) | Neil Blaney (FF) | William Sheldon (Ind.) | Daniel McMenamin (FG) |
| 15th | 1954 | Liam Cunningham (FF) | Neil Blaney (FF) | William Sheldon (Ind.) | Daniel McMenamin (FG) |
| 16th | 1957 | Liam Cunningham (FF) | Neil Blaney (FF) | William Sheldon (Ind.) | Daniel McMenamin (FG) |
| 17th | 1961 | Constituency abolished. See Donegal North-East and Donegal South-West | | | |
