= Neil Blaney =

Irish politician (1922–1995)

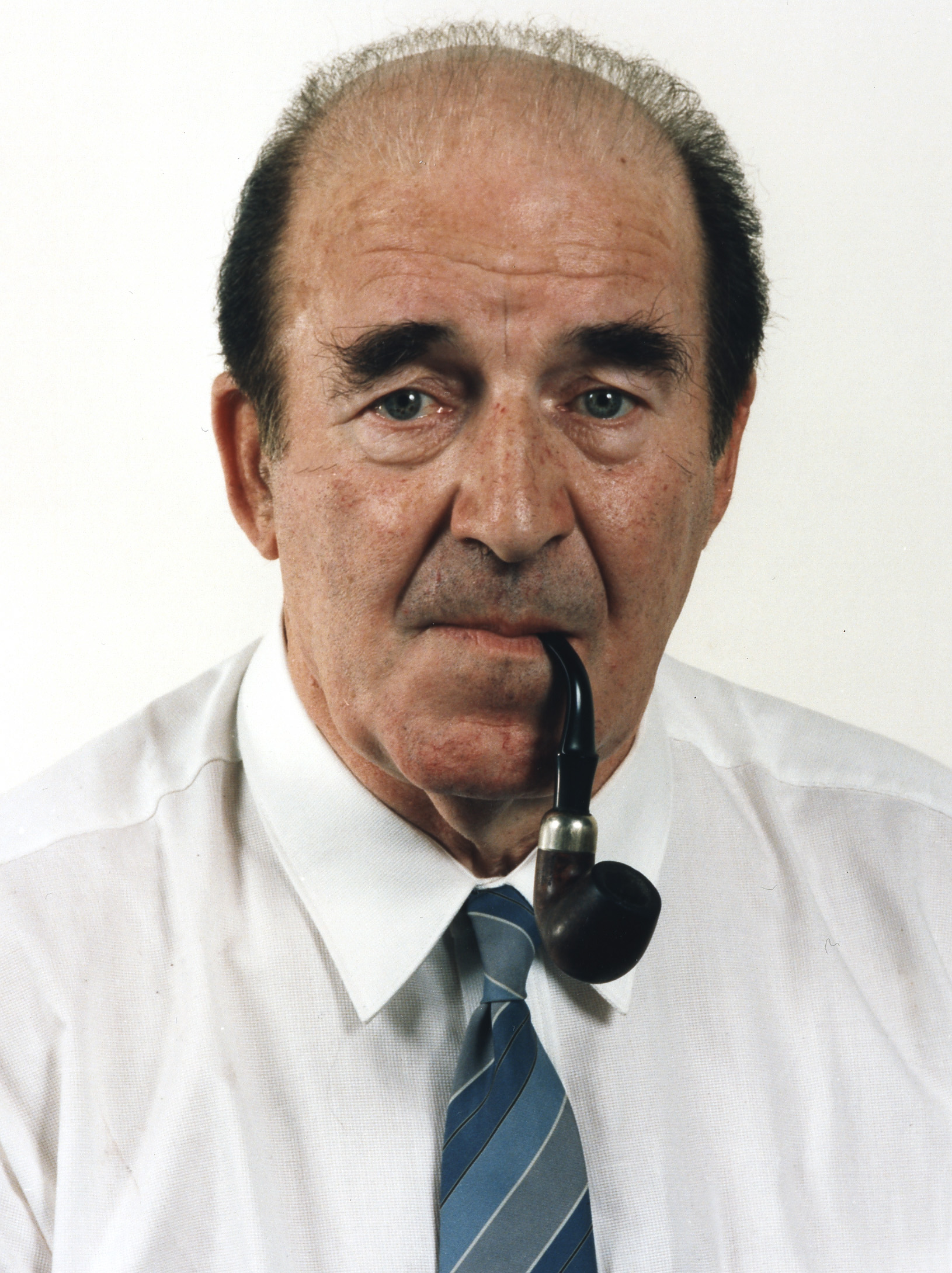
- Blaney in 1990

Leader of Independent Fianna Fáil
- In office 1972–1995
- Preceded by: Party established
- Succeeded by: Harry Blaney

Minister for Agriculture and Fisheries
- In office 11 November 1966 – 7 May 1970
- Taoiseach: Jack Lynch
- Preceded by: Charles Haughey
- Succeeded by: Jim Gibbons

Minister for Local Government
- In office 27 November 1957 – 10 November 1966
- Taoiseach: Seán Lemass
- Preceded by: Paddy Smith
- Succeeded by: Kevin Boland

Minister for Posts and Telegraphs
- In office 20 March 1957 – 4 December 1957
- Taoiseach: Seán Lemass
- Preceded by: Michael Keyes
- Succeeded by: John Ormonde

Teachta Dála
- In office June 1977 – June 1981
- Constituency: Donegal
- In office June 1981 – 8 November 1995
- In office October 1961 – June 1977
- Constituency: Donegal North-East
- In office December 1948 – October 1961
- Constituency: Donegal East

Member of the European Parliament
- In office June 1989 – June 1994
- In office June 1979 – June 1984
- Constituency: Connacht–Ulster

Personal details
- Born: 1 October 1922 Fanad, County Donegal, Ireland
- Died: 8 November 1995 (aged 73) Dublin, Ireland
- Party: Independent Fianna Fáil (1970–1995); Fianna Fáil (until 1970)
- Spouse: Eva Corduff
- Parent: Neal Blaney (father)
- Relatives: Harry Blaney (brother); Niall Blaney (nephew)
- Education: St Eunan's College

Neil Terence Columba Blaney (1 October 1922 – 8 November 1995) was an Irish politician. He was first elected to Dáil Éireann in 1948 as a Fianna Fáil Teachta Dála (TD) representing Donegal East. A high-profile member of the party, Blaney served as a government minister several times; he was Minister for Posts and Telegraphs (1957), Minister for Local Government (1957–1966) and Minister for Agriculture and Fisheries (1966–1970). In 1970 Blaney's career was radically altered when, alongside Charles Haughey, he was involved in the Arms Crisis and stood accused of clandestinely arranging to provide weapons to the newly-emergent Provisional Irish Republican Army. Although later acquitted of wrongdoing in an Irish court, Blaney's involvement in the crisis saw him stripped of his ministries and eventually forced his expulsion from Fianna Fáil. A dogged political campaigner, Blaney managed to retain his seat in Donegal and remained a TD for another two decades, running under the banner of "Independent Fianna Fáil". In addition to being a TD, Blaney also entered into European politics, becoming a member of the European Parliament in 1979. Blaney was a holder of both offices when he died in 1995. Entering the Dáil as its youngest member, he left it as the oldest member.

== Early life ==
Neil Blaney was born in 1922 in the village of Rossnakill in rural Fanad Peninsula in the north of County Donegal, in Ireland. The second eldest of a family of eleven, Blaney's father Neal had been a commander of the Irish Republican Army (IRA) in Donegal during the War of Independence and the Civil War. His father served as both a TD and as a Senator from 1927 through 1948; at which point Neil Blaney succeed him in that role. It was from his father that Blaney got his strong republican views and his first introduction to politics. He was educated locally at Tamney on the Fanad Peninsula and later attended St Eunan's College in Letterkenny as a boarder. Blaney later worked as an organiser with the Irish National Vintners and Grocers Association.

== Early political career ==
Blaney was first elected to Dáil Éireann for the Donegal East constituency in a by-election in December 1948, following the death of his father from cancer. He also became a member of Donegal County Council. Upon his election Blaney was the youngest member of the Dáil. He remained on the backbenches for a number of years before he was one of a group of young party members handpicked by Seán Lemass to begin a re-organisation drive for the party following the defeat at the 1954 general election. Within the party Blaney gained fame by running the party's by-election campaigns throughout the 1950s and 1960s. He introduced the concept of cavalcades after his election victories in his constituency together with roadside bonfires. At the time this was an alien political concept in Ireland. Blaney also adopted wearing sunglasses, chewing gum and wearing bright ties and colourful suits. His dedicated bands of supporters earned the sobriquet 'the Donegal Mafia', and succeeded in getting Des O'Malley and Gerry Collins elected to the Dáil.

== Ministerial career ==
Following Fianna Fáil's victory at the 1957 general election Éamon de Valera, as Taoiseach, brought new blood into the cabinet in the shape of Blaney, Jack Lynch, Kevin Boland and Mícheál Ó Móráin. Blaney was appointed Minister for Posts and Telegraphs, becoming the first government minister from Donegal, however, he moved to the position of Minister for Local Government at the end of 1957 following the death of Seán Moylan. Blaney proved to be an innovative minister and his first task as minister was to prepare the groundwork for the referendum to scrap the proportional representation electoral system and replace it with the first-past-the-post voting system. The referendum failed to be passed, however, Blaney was retained in the post when Lemass succeeded de Valera as Taoiseach in 1959. In 1963 he introduced the Planning Act to rationalise planning throughout the local authorities in the state. This act also created the agency, An Forás Forbatha, to bring planning experts together and also created The IPA as a development agency for the Public Sector. In time An Bord Pleanala would be created as an independent oversight authority. His department underwent a very large programme to provide piped water to rural homes. In 1965 Blaney introduced the Road Traffic Act which required that motorists take a driving test in roadworthy cars. During his tenure it became possible to pay rates (property taxes) by instalment and he also introduced legislation which entitled non-nationals to vote in local elections. In his time in this department he is also synonymous with the construction of the towers in Ballymun an attempt at state-planning. Blaney always claimed that the project would have worked had it remained out of local-authority regulatory ownership or management.

In 1966 Lemass resigned as Taoiseach and Fianna Fáil leader. The subsequent leadership election saw George Colley and Charles Haughey emerge as the two front-runners. Blaney was unimpressed with the choice and, with the support of the like-minded Kevin Boland, he threw his hat in the ring, declaring himself to be the "Radical Republican" candidate. However outside the Northwest and apart from Boland, Blaney failed to attract much support. After some pressure from Lemass the Cork politician, Jack Lynch, entered the race and was deemed to be an unbeatable candidate. Haughey and Boland withdrew in support of Lynch, however, Colley forced a contest. He was defeated heavily with Lynch becoming party leader and Taoiseach. In the subsequent cabinet reshuffle Blaney was appointed Minister for Agriculture and Fisheries.

== Arms Crisis ==
In 1969, when conflict broke out in Northern Ireland, Blaney was one of the first to express strong Irish republican views in support of Northern nationalists, views which contradicted the policy of the Irish Government. Blaney was a native of Ulster, and was affected by the outbreak of violence in parts of his home province. He was concerned about the plight of the Nationalist majority in West Tyrone and in Derry, areas that bordered his constituency in West Ulster. From around late 1968 onwards, Blaney formed and presided over an unofficial Nationalist group in Leinster House popularly known as 'the Letterkenny Table', so named because this group of politicians used to meet at a certain table in either the Dáil bar or the Dáil restaurant. The group was dominated by Blaney up until his death. He had also been one of a four-member Cabinet sub-committee set up to decide on government policy to Northern Ireland together with Charles Haughey, Pádraig Faulkner, and Joseph Brennan. A fund of £100,000 was set up to give to the nationalist people in the form of aid. However, those involved have denied that the government supported the importation of arms.

In December 1969 Blaney declared in Donegal that "the Fianna Fáil Party has never taken a decision to rule out the use of force if the circumstances in the Six Counties so demanded".

There was general surprise when, in an incident known as the Arms Crisis, Blaney, along with Haughey, was sacked from Taoiseach Jack Lynch's cabinet amid allegations of the use of the funds to import arms for use by the new emergent Provisional IRA. Opposition leader Liam Cosgrave was informed by the Garda that a plot to import arms existed and included government members. Cosgrave told Lynch he knew of the plot and would announce it in the Dáil next day if he did not act. Lynch asked for Haughey and Blaney's resignations. Both men refused, saying they did nothing illegal. Lynch then advised President de Valera to sack Haughey and Blaney from the government. Kevin Boland resigned in sympathy, while Mícheál Ó Móráin was dismissed one day earlier in a preemptive strike to ensure that he was not the Minister for Justice when the crisis broke. Lynch chose government chief whip Des O'Malley for the role. Haughey and Blaney were subsequently tried in court along with an army Officer, Captain James Kelly, and Albert Luykx, a Belgian businessman who allegedly used his contacts to buy the arms. At trial, all the accused were acquitted, but many of their critics refused to recognise the verdict of the courts. Although Blaney was cleared of wrongdoing, his ministerial career was brought to an end.

Lynch subsequently moved against Blaney so as to isolate him in the party. He was defeated by George Colley in a vote for the position of Joint Honorary Treasurer at the 1971 Ardfheis, while his constituency colleague, Liam Cunningham, had been appointed a Parliamentary Secretary in the cabinet reshuffle. In the Dáil, Blaney abstained on a motion of no confidence on the worthiness of cabinet minister Jim Gibbons for office, sponsored by the opposition. Paudge Brennan and Des Foley acted similarly and, while the government survived, they were all expelled from the parliamentary party. When Blaney and his supporters tried to organise the party's national collection independently, Lynch acted, and in 1972 Blaney was expelled from the Fianna Fáil party for 'conduct unbecoming'.

== Independent Fianna Fáil ==
Following his expulsion from Fianna Fáil, Kevin Boland tried to persuade Blaney to join the Aontacht Éireann party he was creating but Blaney declined. Instead, he contested all subsequent elections for Independent Fianna Fáil – The Republican Party, an organisation that he built up, chiefly in the County Donegal constituencies from disaffected members of the Fianna Fáil party who remained loyal to him along with a large number of Republicans. Throughout the 1970s there were frequent calls for his re-admittance to Fianna Fáil but the most vocal opponents of this move were Fianna Fáil delegates from County Donegal.

At the 1979 European elections Blaney topped the poll in the Connacht–Ulster constituency to the annoyance of Fianna Fáil. He sat in the Technical Group of Independents and served as chair of the group along with the Italian Radical Marco Pannella and Danish left-wing Eurosceptic Jens-Peter Bonde. He narrowly lost the seat at the 1984 election to Ray MacSharry but was returned to serve as an MEP in 1989 election where he sat with the regionalist Rainbow Group. He also canvassed for IRA hunger striker Bobby Sands in the Fermanagh and South Tyrone by-election, in which Sands was elected to Westminster.

Blaney contracted cancer from which he died at the age of 73 on 8 November 1995. He held his Dáil seat until his death and was the reigning Father of the Dáil at that time. His death occurred at the Mater Private Hospital in Dublin.

In the resulting by-election on 2 April 1996, the Fianna Fáil candidate reclaimed the seat. However, Blaney's brother, Harry Blaney, was elected as an Independent Fianna Fáil TD at the 1997 general election. He was replaced by his son, Niall Blaney, who was elected at the 2002 general election. But in July 2006 Niall rejoined Fianna Fáil. This was opposed by other members of the Blaney family, including all seven children of Neil Blaney and his widow Eva, who issued a press release prior to Niall Blaney's decision castigating the Fianna Fáil party and disassociating themselves from any so called 'truce' with them.

== Legacy ==
Irish historian Patrick Maume summarised Blaney's career by noting

"the ruthless authoritarianism which marked his career [and] his effectiveness as administrator and party fixer. The volatile mixture of calculation, resentment, sophistication, provincialism, ruthlessness, and nostalgia which he displayed is reminiscent of other political figures of his intermediate generation; he might well have been taoiseach but instead became a catalyst for the formation of the Provisional IRA".

A road in Letterkenny is named the Neil T. Blaney Road in his honour. He is buried in Sutton.

== See also ==
- Families in the Oireachtas

Political offices
Preceded by Michael Keyes	Minister for Posts and Telegraphs; 1957	Succeeded by John Ormonde
Preceded by Paddy Smith	Minister for Local Government; 1957–1966	Succeeded by Kevin Boland
Preceded by Charles Haughey	Minister for Agriculture and Fisheries; 1966–1970	Succeeded by Jim Gibbons
Honorary titles
Preceded by Oliver J. Flanagan	Baby of the Dáil; 1948–1949	Succeeded by William J. Murphy
Preceded by Oliver J. Flanagan	Father of the Dáil; 1987–1995	Succeeded by Séamus Pattison

Dáil	Election	Deputy (Party)	Deputy (Party)	Deputy (Party)	Deputy (Party)
9th	1937	John Friel (FF)	Neal Blaney (FF)	James Myles (Ind.)	Daniel McMenamin (FG)
10th	1938	John Friel (FF)	Henry McDevitt (FF)	James Myles (Ind.)	Daniel McMenamin (FG)
11th	1943	John Friel (FF)	Neal Blaney (FF)	William Sheldon (CnaT)	Daniel McMenamin (FG)
12th	1944	John Friel (FF)	Neal Blaney (FF)	William Sheldon (Ind.)	Daniel McMenamin (FG)
13th	1948	John Friel (FF)	Neal Blaney (FF)	William Sheldon (Ind.)	Daniel McMenamin (FG)
13th	1948 by-election	John Friel (FF)	Neil Blaney (FF)	William Sheldon (Ind.)	Daniel McMenamin (FG)
14th	1951	Liam Cunningham (FF)	Neil Blaney (FF)	William Sheldon (Ind.)	Daniel McMenamin (FG)
15th	1954	Liam Cunningham (FF)	Neil Blaney (FF)	William Sheldon (Ind.)	Daniel McMenamin (FG)
16th	1957	Liam Cunningham (FF)	Neil Blaney (FF)	William Sheldon (Ind.)	Daniel McMenamin (FG)
17th	1961	Constituency abolished. See Donegal North-East and Donegal South-West			

Dáil	Election	Deputy (Party)	Deputy (Party)	Deputy (Party)
17th	1961	Liam Cunningham (FF)	Neil Blaney (IFF)	Paddy Harte (FG)
18th	1965	Liam Cunningham (FF)	Neil Blaney (IFF)	Paddy Harte (FG)
19th	1969	Liam Cunningham (FF)	Neil Blaney (IFF)	Paddy Harte (FG)
20th	1973	Liam Cunningham (FF)	Neil Blaney (IFF)	Paddy Harte (FG)
20th	1976 by-election	Paddy Keaveney (IFF)	Neil Blaney (IFF)	Paddy Harte (FG)
21st	1977	Constituency abolished. See Donegal		
22nd	1981	Hugh Conaghan (FF)	Neil Blaney (IFF)	Paddy Harte (FG)
23rd	1982 (Feb)	Hugh Conaghan (FF)	Neil Blaney (IFF)	Paddy Harte (FG)
24th	1982 (Nov)	Hugh Conaghan (FF)	Neil Blaney (IFF)	Paddy Harte (FG)
25th	1987	Hugh Conaghan (FF)	Neil Blaney (IFF)	Paddy Harte (FG)
26th	1989	Jim McDaid (FF)	Neil Blaney (IFF)	Paddy Harte (FG)
27th	1992	Jim McDaid (FF)	Neil Blaney (IFF)	Paddy Harte (FG)
27th	1996 by-election	Jim McDaid (FF)	Cecilia Keaveney (FF)	Paddy Harte (FG)
28th	1997	Jim McDaid (FF)	Cecilia Keaveney (FF)	Harry Blaney (IFF)
29th	2002	Jim McDaid (FF)	Cecilia Keaveney (FF)	Niall Blaney (IFF)
30th	2007	Jim McDaid (FF)	Joe McHugh (FG)	Niall Blaney (FF)
31st	2011	Charlie McConalogue (FF)	Joe McHugh (FG)	Pádraig Mac Lochlainn (SF)
32nd	2016	Constituency abolished. See Donegal		

Dáil	Election	Deputy (Party)	Deputy (Party)	Deputy (Party)	Deputy (Party)	Deputy (Party)	Deputy (Party)	Deputy (Party)	Deputy (Party)
2nd	1921	Joseph O'Doherty (SF)	Samuel O'Flaherty (SF)	Patrick McGoldrick (SF)	Joseph McGinley (SF)	Joseph Sweeney (SF)	Peter Ward (SF)	6 seats 1921–1923	
3rd	1922	Joseph O'Doherty (AT-SF)	Samuel O'Flaherty (AT-SF)	Patrick McGoldrick (PT-SF)	Joseph McGinley (PT-SF)	Joseph Sweeney (PT-SF)	Peter Ward (PT-SF)	6 seats 1921–1923	
4th	1923	Joseph O'Doherty (Rep)	Peadar O'Donnell (Rep)	Patrick McGoldrick (CnaG)	Eugene Doherty (CnaG)	Patrick McFadden (CnaG)	Peter Ward (CnaG)	James Myles (Ind.)	John White (FP)
4th	1924 by-election	Joseph O'Doherty (Rep)	Peadar O'Donnell (Rep)	Patrick McGoldrick (CnaG)	Eugene Doherty (CnaG)	Patrick McFadden (CnaG)	Denis McCullough (CnaG)	James Myles (Ind.)	John White (FP)
5th	1927 (Jun)	Frank Carney (FF)	Neal Blaney (FF)	Daniel McMenamin (NL)	Eugene Doherty (CnaG)	Michael Óg McFadden (CnaG)	Hugh Law (CnaG)	James Myles (Ind.)	John White (FP)
6th	1927 (Sep)	Frank Carney (FF)	Neal Blaney (FF)	Archie Cassidy (Lab)	Eugene Doherty (CnaG)	Michael Óg McFadden (CnaG)	Hugh Law (CnaG)	James Myles (Ind.)	John White (FP)
7th	1932	Frank Carney (FF)	Neal Blaney (FF)	Brian Brady (FF)	Eugene Doherty (CnaG)	Daniel McMenamin (CnaG)	James Dillon (Ind.)	James Myles (Ind.)	John White (CnaG)
8th	1933	Joseph O'Doherty (FF)	Neal Blaney (FF)	Brian Brady (FF)	Hugh Doherty (FF)	Daniel McMenamin (CnaG)	James Dillon (NCP)	James Myles (Ind.)	Michael Óg McFadden (CnaG)
9th	1937	Constituency abolished. See Donegal East and Donegal West							

Dáil	Election	Deputy (Party)	Deputy (Party)	Deputy (Party)	Deputy (Party)	Deputy (Party)
21st	1977	Hugh Conaghan (FF)	Joseph Brennan (FF)	Neil Blaney (IFF)	James White (FG)	Paddy Harte (FG)
21st	1980 by-election	Hugh Conaghan (FF)	Clement Coughlan (FF)	Neil Blaney (IFF)	James White (FG)	Paddy Harte (FG)
22nd	1981	Constituency abolished. See Donegal North-East and Donegal South-West				

Dáil	Election	Deputy (Party)	Deputy (Party)	Deputy (Party)	Deputy (Party)	Deputy (Party)
32nd	2016	Pearse Doherty (SF)	Pat "the Cope" Gallagher (FF)	Thomas Pringle (Ind.)	Charlie McConalogue (FF)	Joe McHugh (FG)
33rd	2020	Pearse Doherty (SF)	Pádraig Mac Lochlainn (SF)	Thomas Pringle (Ind.)	Charlie McConalogue (FF)	Joe McHugh (FG)
34th	2024	Pearse Doherty (SF)	Pádraig Mac Lochlainn (SF)	Charles Ward (100%R)	Charlie McConalogue (FF)	Pat "the Cope" Gallagher (FF)
