= Timothy J. Murphy =

Irish politician (1893–1949)

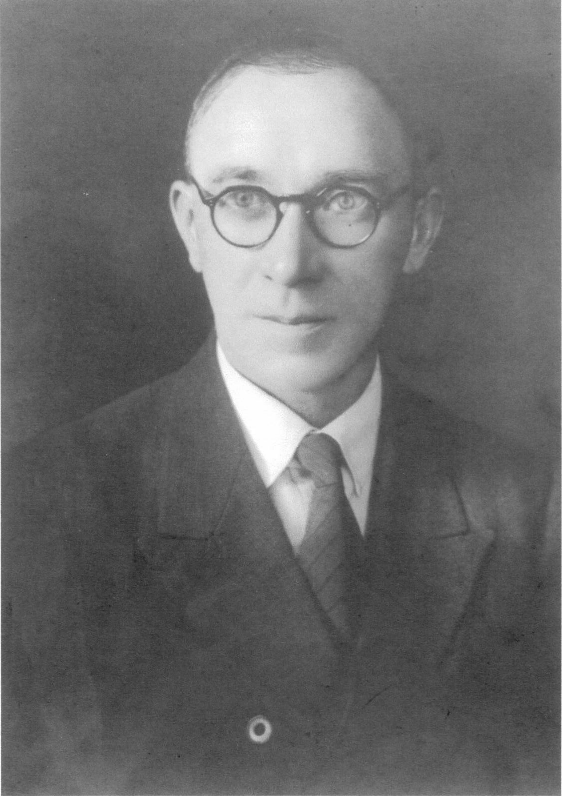

Minister for Local Government
- In office 18 February 1948 – 29 April 1949
- Taoiseach: John A. Costello
- Preceded by: Seán MacEntee
- Succeeded by: William Norton (acting)

Teachta Dála
- In office August 1923 – 29 April 1949
- Constituency: Cork West

Personal details
- Born: 17 July 1893 Clondrohid, County Cork, Ireland
- Died: 29 April 1949 (aged 55) Fermoy, County Cork, Ireland
- Party: Labour Party
- Children: 6, including William

Timothy Joseph Murphy (17 July 1893 – 29 April 1949) was an Irish Labour Party politician who served as Minister for Local Government from 1948 to 1949. He served as a Teachta Dála (TD) for the Cork West constituency from 1923 to 1949.

== Early life ==
Known as 'TJ', he was born in Clondrohid, County Cork, son of Timothy Murphy, carpenter, and Mary Murphy (née Shea). He moved to Dunmanway, County Cork around 1920, having been earlier educated at the Clondrohid and Macroom National Schools. In his teens he was influenced by the activities of the Irish Land and Labour Association as well as the politics of William O'Brien. During these years he became involved in a trade union and with the Labour Party.

He was involved in journalism for a period, and became a salesman for Singer sewing machines before moving to Dunmanway around 1919.

== Politician ==
=== Trade unionist ===
By 1922, he became branch Secretary of the Dunmanway ITGWU. His was also involved in local politics and had a role in the election of fellow ITGWU activist in Dunmanway, Michael Bradley, to the Dáil in the 1922 general election.

He expanded the role of 'labour clubs' and was involved in the formation of virtually every Labour Club between 1926 and the early 1930s.

=== TD and councillor (1923–1949) ===
Following Bradley's death in 1922, he contested the selection convention for the 1923 general election. At the Labour Party selection convention two Timothy Murphy's were nominated with the Dunmanway Murphy winning out by one vote over Timothy from Clonakilty.

He was first elected to Dáil Éireann at the 1923 general election as a Labour Party TD for Cork West. He was re-elected for this constituency as a Labour Party TD at the next nine general elections, until his death, but remained on the opposition benches of the Dáil until 1948 when the Labour Party joined the First Inter-Party Government. The Taoiseach John A. Costello then appointed him as Minister for Local Government in February of that year. He took a running mate in 1943 and 1944 but failed to deliver a second seat.

In the Dáil he supported the Treaty, urged Fianna Fáil to reject their abstentionist policy and return to normal politics. He was, however, in favour of Labour being an independent party and opposed the party supporting Fianna Fáil in government.

He had also sat on the Cork County Council from 1925, representing the Dunmanway local electoral area (1925–42) and the Skibereen local electoral area from 1942 until his resignation from the council in July 1948. He served on a number of county council committees and as vice-chairman and Chairman of the council, and was also a member of the West Cork board of public assistance and public health. Murphy advocated for Christian Socialism and the co-operative movement.

==== Michael O'Riordan controversy (1944) ====
Murphy has been described as having been involved in the controversy surrounding the Liam Mellow branch of the Labour Party and Michael O'Riordan. A report in The Irish Press suggested that the Administrative Council had become aware that certain persons in Cork were engaging in activities which appear to be inconsistent with their membership of the Labour Party and they appointed a subcommittee to investigate the membership and administration of the Liam Mellows Branch. This was headed up by Murphy as vice-chair. They heard the complaint against O'Riordan and Nagle being present at the (NI) Communist Party conference. Following an investigation, the two Cork members were expelled on 5 February 1944 and the 4 Dublin members in April. O'Riordan would later accuse Murphy of "red-baiting".

=== Cabinet: Minister for Local Government (1948–1949) ===
Local Authority Manager Philip Monahan told Cork Corporation in 1948 that an experiment to build houses by direct labour had been suggested by Murphy. To proceed with the direct labour experiment, the City Manager was in the process of appointing an assistant architect, a draughtsman, an assistant engineer and a foreman. Concurrently, Monahan had decided to build other houses by contract so that the corporation could then decide if one method was superior to the other. A deputation of the Cork Regional Branch of the Federation of Builders, Contractors and Allied Employers of Ireland appeared before the meeting to protest this direct labour policy, but the Corporation agreed to proceed with the project as outlined by the City Manager.

== Death ==
Murphy died suddenly in 1949, while speaking at an Inter-Party public meeting at Pearse Square, Fermoy, fourteen months into his tenure as a cabinet minister. He was buried in Dunmanway Cemetery. The by-election for his seat in the Dáil was held on 15 June 1949, and won for the Labour Party by his son, William J. Murphy.

== Legacy ==
An area of Murphy's home town of Dunmanway today bears the name "T.J. Murphy Place".

Political offices
Preceded by Seán MacEntee	Minister for Local Government; 1948–1949	Succeeded by William Norton

Dáil	Election	Deputy (Party)	Deputy (Party)	Deputy (Party)	Deputy (Party)	Deputy (Party)
4th	1923	Timothy J. Murphy (Lab)	Seán Buckley (Rep)	Cornelius Connolly (CnaG)	John Prior (CnaG)	Timothy O'Donovan (FP)
5th	1927 (Jun)	Timothy J. Murphy (Lab)	Thomas Mullins (FF)	Timothy Sheehy (CnaG)	Jasper Wolfe (Ind.)	Timothy O'Donovan (FP)
6th	1927 (Sep)	Timothy J. Murphy (Lab)	Thomas Mullins (FF)	Timothy Sheehy (CnaG)	Jasper Wolfe (Ind.)	Timothy O'Donovan (FP)
7th	1932	Timothy J. Murphy (Lab)	Raphael Keyes (FF)	Eamonn O'Neill (CnaG)	Jasper Wolfe (Ind.)	Timothy O'Donovan (FP)
8th	1933	Timothy J. Murphy (Lab)	Tom Hales (FF)	Eamonn O'Neill (CnaG)	James Burke (CnaG)	Timothy O'Donovan (NCP)
9th	1937	Timothy J. Murphy (Lab)	Timothy O'Sullivan (FF)	Daniel O'Leary (FG)	Eamonn O'Neill (FG)	Timothy O'Donovan (FG)
10th	1938	Timothy J. Murphy (Lab)	Timothy O'Sullivan (FF)	Seán Buckley (FF)	Eamonn O'Neill (FG)	Timothy O'Donovan (FG)
11th	1943	Timothy J. Murphy (Lab)	Timothy O'Sullivan (FF)	Seán Buckley (FF)	Patrick O'Driscoll (Ind.)	Timothy O'Donovan (FG)
12th	1944	Timothy J. Murphy (Lab)	Timothy O'Sullivan (FF)	Seán Buckley (FF)	Patrick O'Driscoll (Ind.)	Eamonn O'Neill (FG)
13th	1948	Timothy J. Murphy (Lab)	Timothy O'Sullivan (FF)	Seán Collins (FG)	3 seats 1948–1961	
13th	1949 by-election	William J. Murphy (Lab)	Timothy O'Sullivan (FF)	Seán Collins (FG)	3 seats 1948–1961	
14th	1951	Michael Pat Murphy (Lab)	Timothy O'Sullivan (FF)	Seán Collins (FG)	3 seats 1948–1961	
15th	1954	Michael Pat Murphy (Lab)	Edward Cotter (FF)	Seán Collins (FG)	3 seats 1948–1961	
16th	1957	Michael Pat Murphy (Lab)	Edward Cotter (FF)	Florence Wycherley (Ind.)	3 seats 1948–1961	
17th	1961	Constituency abolished. See Cork South-West				
