= Pat McFadden (disambiguation) =

Pat McFadden (born 1965) is a British politician.

Pat McFadden may also refer to:

- Patrick McFadden, Irish Cumann na nGaedheal politician 1923–1927
- Patricia McFadden (born 1952), Swazi radical feminist
