= Peter J. Ward =

Irish politician (1891–1970)

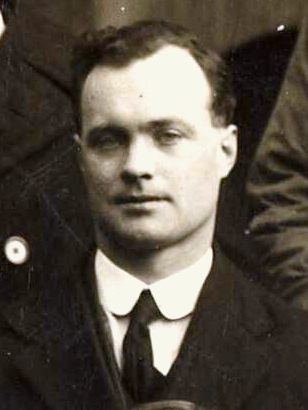
- Ward in 1919

Teachta Dála
- In office May 1921 – 1 August 1924
- Constituency: Donegal
- In office December 1918 – May 1921
- Constituency: Donegal South

Personal details
- Born: 1 November 1891 County Donegal, Ireland
- Died: 1 June 1970 (aged 78) County Donegal, Ireland
- Party: Sinn Féin; Cumann na nGaedheal
- Children: 2

British Army intelligence file for Peter Joseph Ward

Peter Joseph Ward (1 November 1891 – 6 January 1970) was an Irish lawyer and Sinn Féin (later Cumann na nGaedheal) politician in County Donegal. He served as a TD from 1918 until his resignation in 1924. He was also chairman of Donegal County Council after the 1920 local elections. From 1926 to 1961 he was county registrar for County Donegal. On his retirement from which the Derry Journal called him "one of the best known men in the county".

A native of Killybegs, Ward was was the son of schoolteacher John Ward and Anne Byrne. His father was a Gaelic League organiser. Ward graduated from University College Dublin where he had played for the college association football team. He qualified as a solicitor in 1915. In the 1918 general election to the UK House of Commons, in which Sinn Féin had stood on an abstentionist platform, he was returned unopposed in the single-seat constituency of South Donegal. Sinn Féin won 73 of the 105 seats in Ireland and established Dáil Éireann in January 1919, with its members known as Teachtaí Dála (TDs). Ward was one of 27 TDs present in the Mansion House, Dublin for the inaugural meeting on 21 January 1919. As Commandant of the South Donegal Brigade of the Irish Republican Army he was active in the Irish War of Independence and being "on the run" from, and later imprisoned by, the British authorities limited his participation as a TD. After being released from hunger strike, he was elected at the 1920 Donegal County Council election and became chairman of the council. He was also elected as one of six Sinn Féin candidates returned unopposed for Donegal at the 1921 Irish election to the House of Commons of Southern Ireland. Sinn Féin did not recognise this new body, treating it as the election to the Second Dáil.

Ward voted in favour of the Anglo-Irish Treaty in January 1922, and in the 1922 election the same six TDs were returned unopposed for Donegal under the Collins–de Valera pact. Ward joined Cumann na nGaedheal when that party was formed in early 1923 by former pro-Treaty Sinn Féin TDs who backed the 1st executive council of the Irish Free State. He reluctantly agreed to stand for Cumann na nGaedheal in the 1923 general election that followed the end of the Irish Civil War, where he was one of eight TDs returned in Donegal from 19 candidates. Around this time he was Donegal GAA County Board Chairman.

He was anxious to return to his legal practice after the Courts of Justice Act 1924 had settled the legal landscape after the Irish revolutionary period. He resigned his seat on 1 August 1924, and the ensuing by-election in November was won by the Cumann na nGaedheal candidate Denis McCullough. His legal work was in Killybegs and Donegal town. In 1926, Ward was appointed as county registrar under the Courts of Justice Act 1924. After his 1961 retirement he lived in Raphoe.

Ward died in Lifford District Hospital. He had two children, a son John P. Ward, a solicitor, and a daughter, Sister Eunan, "of the Medical Missionaries of Mary, Biafra".

Parliament of the United Kingdom
Preceded by J. G. Swift MacNeill	Member of Parliament for South Donegal; 1918–1922	Constituency abolished
Oireachtas
New constituency	Teachta Dála for South Donegal; 1918–1921	Constituency abolished

Dáil	Election	Deputy (Party)	Deputy (Party)	Deputy (Party)	Deputy (Party)	Deputy (Party)	Deputy (Party)	Deputy (Party)	Deputy (Party)
2nd	1921	Joseph O'Doherty (SF)	Samuel O'Flaherty (SF)	Patrick McGoldrick (SF)	Joseph McGinley (SF)	Joseph Sweeney (SF)	Peter Ward (SF)	6 seats 1921–1923	
3rd	1922	Joseph O'Doherty (AT-SF)	Samuel O'Flaherty (AT-SF)	Patrick McGoldrick (PT-SF)	Joseph McGinley (PT-SF)	Joseph Sweeney (PT-SF)	Peter Ward (PT-SF)	6 seats 1921–1923	
4th	1923	Joseph O'Doherty (Rep)	Peadar O'Donnell (Rep)	Patrick McGoldrick (CnaG)	Eugene Doherty (CnaG)	Patrick McFadden (CnaG)	Peter Ward (CnaG)	James Myles (Ind.)	John White (FP)
4th	1924 by-election	Joseph O'Doherty (Rep)	Peadar O'Donnell (Rep)	Patrick McGoldrick (CnaG)	Eugene Doherty (CnaG)	Patrick McFadden (CnaG)	Denis McCullough (CnaG)	James Myles (Ind.)	John White (FP)
5th	1927 (Jun)	Frank Carney (FF)	Neal Blaney (FF)	Daniel McMenamin (NL)	Eugene Doherty (CnaG)	Michael Óg McFadden (CnaG)	Hugh Law (CnaG)	James Myles (Ind.)	John White (FP)
6th	1927 (Sep)	Frank Carney (FF)	Neal Blaney (FF)	Archie Cassidy (Lab)	Eugene Doherty (CnaG)	Michael Óg McFadden (CnaG)	Hugh Law (CnaG)	James Myles (Ind.)	John White (FP)
7th	1932	Frank Carney (FF)	Neal Blaney (FF)	Brian Brady (FF)	Eugene Doherty (CnaG)	Daniel McMenamin (CnaG)	James Dillon (Ind.)	James Myles (Ind.)	John White (CnaG)
8th	1933	Joseph O'Doherty (FF)	Neal Blaney (FF)	Brian Brady (FF)	Hugh Doherty (FF)	Daniel McMenamin (CnaG)	James Dillon (NCP)	James Myles (Ind.)	Michael Óg McFadden (CnaG)
9th	1937	Constituency abolished. See Donegal East and Donegal West							

Dáil	Election	Deputy (Party)	Deputy (Party)	Deputy (Party)	Deputy (Party)	Deputy (Party)
21st	1977	Hugh Conaghan (FF)	Joseph Brennan (FF)	Neil Blaney (IFF)	James White (FG)	Paddy Harte (FG)
21st	1980 by-election	Hugh Conaghan (FF)	Clement Coughlan (FF)	Neil Blaney (IFF)	James White (FG)	Paddy Harte (FG)
22nd	1981	Constituency abolished. See Donegal North-East and Donegal South-West				

Dáil	Election	Deputy (Party)	Deputy (Party)	Deputy (Party)	Deputy (Party)	Deputy (Party)
32nd	2016	Pearse Doherty (SF)	Pat "the Cope" Gallagher (FF)	Thomas Pringle (Ind.)	Charlie McConalogue (FF)	Joe McHugh (FG)
33rd	2020	Pearse Doherty (SF)	Pádraig Mac Lochlainn (SF)	Thomas Pringle (Ind.)	Charlie McConalogue (FF)	Joe McHugh (FG)
34th	2024	Pearse Doherty (SF)	Pádraig Mac Lochlainn (SF)	Charles Ward (100%R)	Charlie McConalogue (FF)	Pat "the Cope" Gallagher (FF)
