= Irish defective block crisis =

Concrete-related building safety issue discovered in 2011

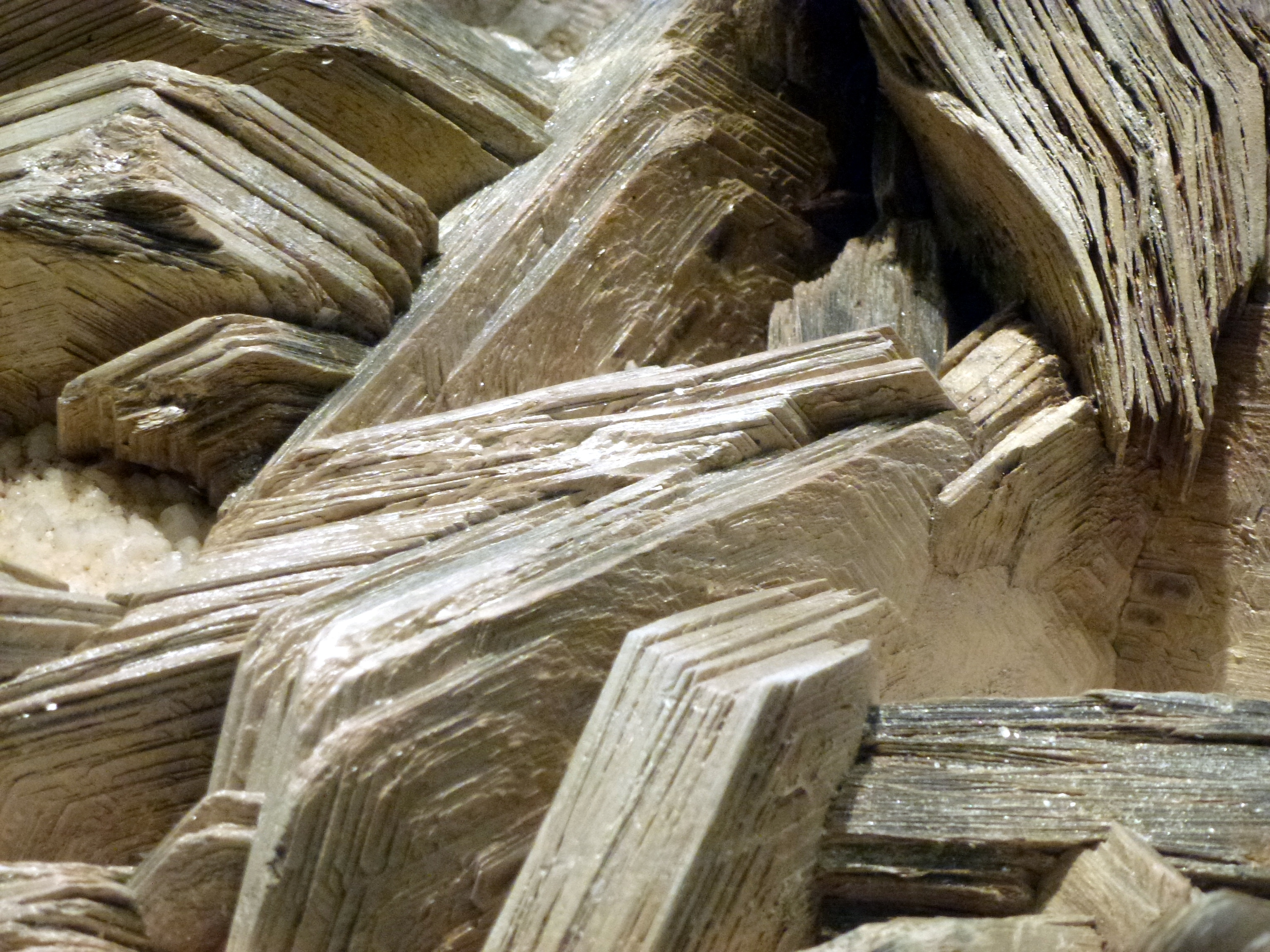
Mica

The Irish defective block crisis is an issue concerning the structural integrity and safety hazards for homes constructed using concrete blocks containing excessive amounts of deleterious materials, mainly sulphide minerals and free mica. To date the counties within the Republic of Ireland most severely impacted have been County Donegal and County Mayo, with other counties having fewer affected buildings. An expert committee established in 2016 by the then Minister of Housing and Urban Renewal investigated the causes in both County Donegal and County Mayo, and concluded that the principal cause of the damage was due to the use of defective concrete blocks. Within county Donegal this was originally termed the Mica scandal in 2011, which is the point at which homes and other buildings began showing signs of cracking and decay. The term "mica scandal" arose because the expert committee had observed that defective concrete blocks within County Donegal contained excessive quantities of the mineral mica liberated within the binder. Within County Mayo the expert committee concluded that the defective blocks were caused by internal sulphate attack sourced from framboidal pyrite within the aggregate.

The scandal led to calls for, and then the establishment of, a scheme to fund affected homeowners of the fault to repair, or demolish and rebuild, their homes. A similar issue with the presence of pyrite in the hardfill of properties was also identified in 2007, originating within quarries in the east of Ireland, and legislation was enacted to address both of the issues similarly. During 2023, new theories were advanced as to the source of the problems with the blocks, specifically that within County Donegal elevated concentrations of pyrrhotite (above relevant EN 12620 guidance, relevant since 2013 in Ireland) was the principal cause of the problem, albeit with elevated mica contributing to a weakened binder.

== Issues ==
=== Impact ===
More than five thousand houses and an unknown number of office and other buildings have been affected, with some owners moving out of their homes as they are no longer safe. Damage generally manifests on properties as cracking of render and walls, expansion of concrete and the eventual loss of structural integrity. The majority of affected homes are in County Donegal, but there are also some in County Mayo, County Clare, County Limerick and elsewhere. Around the same time, the use of pyrite in construction caused similar issues for buildings in the East of Ireland. Cracking and bulging appeared in flooring concrete and other materials soon after construction.

=== Root cause theories ===
Muscovite (also known as common mica) can be found in rocks used to make concrete blocks. It is estimated that a presence of 1% of muscovite in concrete reduces the strength of the internal bonding by 5%, and further that such blocks bond poorly with cement paste. Mica also absorbs water, and excess water can cause problems in cold winters as the process of freezing and thawing damages the blocks. During 2023, additional scientific evidence as to the root cause possibilities emerged, suggesting that the issue may lie more with the iron compound pyrrhotite than with mica, although the high mica content of the binder may still be relevant due to its impact on binder quality, making it more susceptible to internal sulphate attack from the oxidising pyrrhotite.

=== Regulation and reports ===
An expert panel reported to government in 2017 that the problems in these counties add to "the legacy of building failures or severe non-compliance concerns following the downturn in economic and construction activity in 2008, which exposed vulnerabilities in the building control system that was in place at that time". The report included information from the National Standards Authority of Ireland that mica and other harmful impurities are limited to 1% of concrete blocks and this is covered by a statutory instrument. In some affected homes in Donegal, the amount of mica in samples was significantly above the limit, potentially up to 14%. Companies producing building materials must comply with regulations such as the Building Control Regulations.

The report stated that building control authorities lacked the ability to test materials in-house and that all ability to enforce regulations was limited by local authority budgets.

== Campaigning and resolution schemes ==
=== Owners' campaign ===
Campaigns seeking redress for the issue began in 2011.

=== Defective Concrete Blocks Grant Scheme ===
Partly as a result of homeowner campaigning, the Defective Block Scheme was opened in June 2020. The scheme offers five options, from replacing an external wall, with a limit of €49,500, to demolition and rebuilding, with a limit of €247,500. 433 people in Donegal had engaged with the scheme as of June 2021. Campaigners pointed out that homeowners had to pay €5,000 for a mica test to apply to the scheme and that this was a barrier for those who were in financial difficulty. They also wanted the scheme to cover 100% of costs, instead of the proposed 90% of costs. The grant was updated in November 2021, with the limit increased to €420,000, and 100% cover for costs. Houses in Clare and Limerick were added to the scheme, with estimates suggesting that over one thousand homes could be affected in those counties. In June 2022, ministers were advised that the cost of the scheme could reach €3.65 billion if inflation remained high. A similar redress scheme was announced for those affected by pyrite usage in construction, similarly covering 100% of costs, but only for repair works.

=== Protests ===
Protest marches were held in Dublin in June and October 2021, with thousands of people reported to have attended.

In 2023, the Donegal Mica Action Group founded 100% Redress, a political party registered to contest local and Dáil elections. In the 2024 general election, Charles Ward was elected representing 100% Redress.

== Building block businesses and developers ==
2,000 or more legal actions were initiated against suppliers of defective blocks, as well as local authorities and standards bodies for failing to detect the issue, doubts were expressed as to whether the suppliers, at least, had the resources or insurance cover to provide any significant compensation. Actions against developers for using or failing to test blocks were scarcer.

Cassidy Brothers, one of the companies that produced the blocks, was issued with an enforcement notice in October 2021 in relation to land in Cranford, County Donegal. The company was ordered to shut a concrete batching plant and storage yard. In November 2021, they were issued with an unauthorised development letter by Donegal County Council, as they did not have planning permission to develop blocks at their site in Gransha, Buncrana.
