= Clonglash =

Townland in County Donegal, Ireland

Clonglash Cluain Glas
- Townland
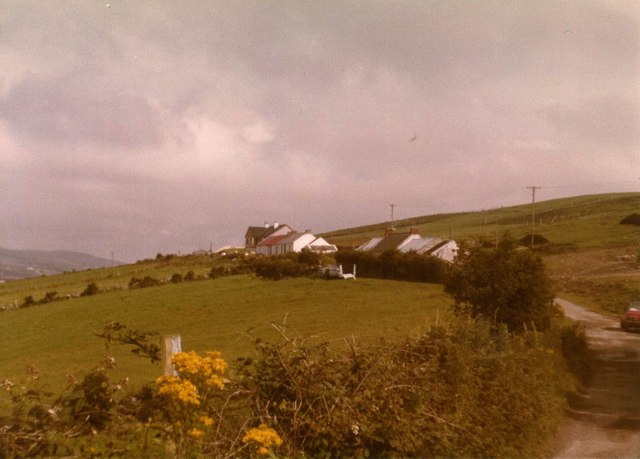
- An image of Clonglash taken from Buncrana in July 1980.

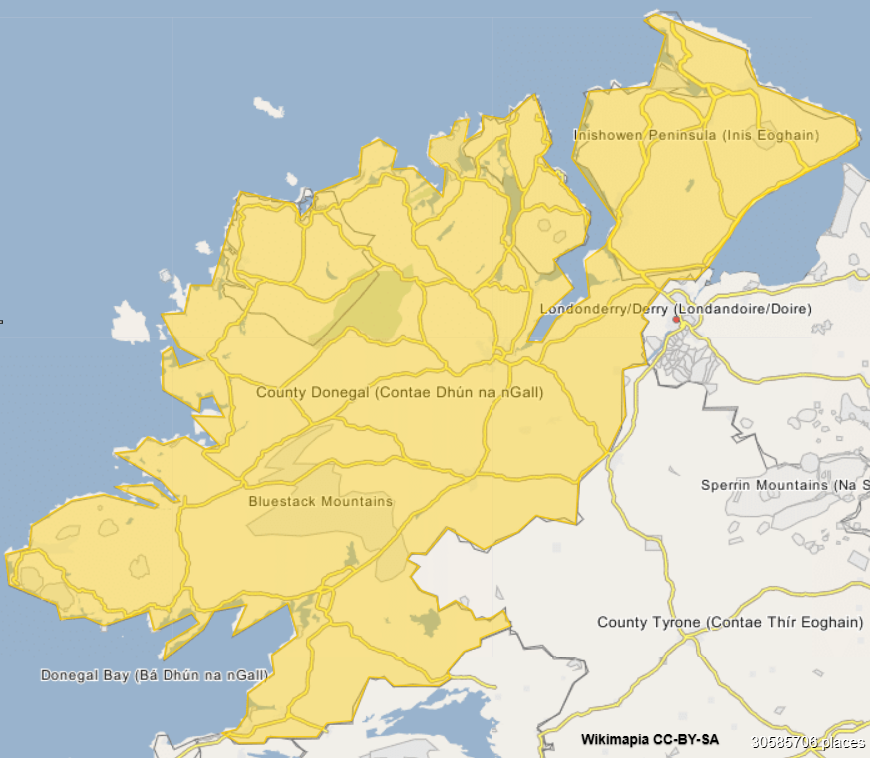
- Location in Ireland. Clonglash (County Donegal)
- Coordinates: 55°07′52″N 7°24′34″W
- Country: Ireland
- Province: Ulster
- County: County Donegal

Government
  - Dáil Éireann: Donegal

Population (2022)
  - Total: 450
- Time zone: UTC+0 (WET)
  - Summer (DST): UTC-1 (IST (WEST))
- Irish Grid Reference: C3776631835

Clonglash (Irish: Cluain Glas) is a townland some two miles (3 km) east of Buncrana on the Inishowen Peninsula in County Donegal, Ireland.

Clonglash, in Irish Cluain Glas (meaning green meadow or plain), is part of the townland that also includes Bauville and Keeloges. In the townland is a regional heritage site, a freestanding four-bay lime kiln, which was built c. 1860 but is no longer in use.
