= Bernard Kelly (Irish politician) =

Irish nationalist politician (1808–1887)

- Born: 1808
- Died: 1 January 1887
- Resting place: Ballyshannon, County Donegal, Ireland
- Political party: Irish Parliamentary Party

Bernard Kelly (1808 – 1 January 1887) was an Irish nationalist politician who served as the first Irish Parliamentary Party MP for the constituency of South Donegal in the House of Commons of the United Kingdom of Great Britain and Ireland. He was first elected in the 1885 general election and re-elected in the general election of 1886. He died in office in 1887.

Kelly is buried at Ballyshannon, County Donegal where his headstone reads:

Bernard Kelly, First Nationalist Member of Parliament for South Donegal died 1 January 1887 aged 78 years. This memorial was erected by his friends and countrymen, at home and abroad, in loving memory of his many personal and social virtues as also to commemorate his pure souled and noble services in the cause of self-government for his native land.

Parliament of the United Kingdom
New constituency	Member of Parliament for South Donegal; 1885 – 1887	Succeeded by J. G. Swift MacNeill
