= South Donegal =

UK parliamentary constituency in Ireland, 1885–1922

- Former county constituency for the House of Commons

1885–1922
- Seats: 1
- Created from: County Donegal
- Replaced by: Donegal

South Donegal was a UK Parliament constituency in Ireland, returning one Member of Parliament from 1885 to 1922.

Prior to the 1885 general election the area was part of the County Donegal constituency. From 1922, on the establishment of the Irish Free State, it was not represented in the UK Parliament.

== Boundaries ==
This constituency comprised the southern part of County Donegal, consisting of the baronies of Banagh and Tirhugh.

== Members of Parliament ==
Election	Member	Party	Note
1885, 8 December	Bernard Kelly	Irish Parliamentary	replaced Thomas Lea
1886, 1 July	Bernard Kelly	Irish Parliamentary	Died 1 January 1887
1887, 2 February	J. G. Swift MacNeill	Irish Parliamentary	By-election
1890, December ^{1}	J. G. Swift MacNeill	Irish National Federation	Party split
1891, March ^{1}	J. G. Swift MacNeill	Irish National Federation	Party reunion
1900, 6 October	J. G. Swift MacNeill	Irish Parliamentary	
1918, 14 December ^{2}	Peter J. Ward	Sinn Féin	Did not take his seat in the House of Commons
1922, 26 October	UK constituency abolished		

Note:-

- ^{1} Not an election, but the date of a party change. The Irish Parliamentary Party had been created in 1882, on the initiative of Charles Stewart Parnell's Irish National League. Both the IPP and the INL split into Parnellite and Anti-Parnellite factions, in December 1890. The Parnellites remained members of the Irish National League after the split and the Anti-Parnellites organised the Irish National Federation in March 1891. The two organisations and the United Irish League merged in 1900, to re-create the Irish Parliamentary Party.
- ^{2} Date of polling day. The result was declared on 28 December 1918, to allow time for votes cast by members of the armed forces to be included in the count.

== Elections ==
=== Elections in the 1880s ===
1885 general election: South Donegal
Party	Candidate	Votes	%	±%
Irish Parliamentary	Bernard Kelly	5,055	78.7	
Irish Conservative	Arthur William Hamilton Foster	1,369	21.3	
Majority		3,686	57.4	
Turnout		6,424	81.8	
Registered electors		7,854		
Irish Parliamentary win (new seat)				

1886 general election: South Donegal
Party	Candidate	Votes	%	±%
Irish Parliamentary	Bernard Kelly	4,905	77.8	−0.9
Irish Conservative	Arthur William Hamilton Foster	1,399	22.2	+0.9
Majority		3,506	55.6	−1.8
Turnout		6,304	80.3	−1.5
Registered electors		7,854		
Irish Parliamentary hold		Swing	−0.9	

By-election, 1887: South Donegal
Party	Candidate	Votes	%	±%
Irish Parliamentary	J. G. Swift MacNeill	4,604	83.1	+5.3
Liberal Unionist	Henry Munster	933	16.9	−5.3
Majority		3,671	66.2	+10.6
Turnout		5,537	70.7	−9.6
Registered electors		7,837		
Irish Parliamentary hold		Swing	+5.3	

=== Elections in the 1890s ===
1892 general election: South Donegal
Party	Candidate	Votes	%	±%
Irish National Federation	J. G. Swift MacNeill	3,930	73.7	−4.1
Irish Unionist	Henry Stubbs	1,400	26.3	+4.1
Majority		2,530	47.4	−8.2
Turnout		5,330	79.4	−0.9
Registered electors		6,710		
Irish National Federation gain from Irish Parliamentary		Swing	−4.1	

1895 general election: South Donegal
Party	Candidate	Votes	%	±%
Irish National Federation	J. G. Swift MacNeill	3,614	73.4	−0.3
Irish Unionist	Henry Stubbs	1,313	26.6	+0.3
Majority		2,301	46.8	−0.6
Turnout		4,927	77.2	−2.2
Registered electors		6,380		
Irish National Federation hold		Swing	−0.3	

=== Elections in the 1900s ===
1900 general election: South Donegal
Party	Candidate	Votes	%	±%
Irish Parliamentary	J. G. Swift MacNeill	Unopposed		
Irish Parliamentary hold				

1906 general election: South Donegal
Party	Candidate	Votes	%	±%
Irish Parliamentary	J. G. Swift MacNeill	Unopposed		
Irish Parliamentary hold				

=== Elections in the 1910s ===
January 1910 general election: South Donegal
Party	Candidate	Votes	%	±%
Irish Parliamentary	J. G. Swift MacNeill	Unopposed		
Irish Parliamentary hold				

December 1910 general election: South Donegal
Party	Candidate	Votes	%	±%
Irish Parliamentary	J. G. Swift MacNeill	Unopposed		
Irish Parliamentary hold				

1918 general election: South Donegal
Party	Candidate	Votes	%	±%
Sinn Féin	Peter J. Ward	5,787	54.9	New
Irish Parliamentary	John Donovan	4,752	45.1	N/A
Majority		1,035	9.8	N/A
Turnout		10,539	62.4	N/A
Registered electors		16,894		
Sinn Féin gain from Irish Parliamentary		Swing	N/A	
