= J. G. Swift MacNeill =

Irish politician

John Gordon Swift MacNeill
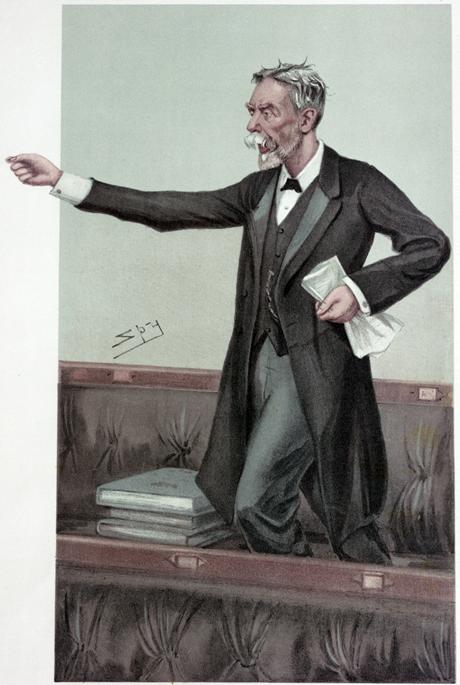
- "South Donegal". Caricature by Spy published in Vanity Fair in 1902.

Member of Parliament for South Donegal
- In office 1887–1918
- Preceded by: Bernard Kelly
- Succeeded by: Peter J. Ward

Personal details
- Born: 11 March 1849
- Died: 24 August 1926 (aged 77)
- Party: Irish Parliamentary Party
- Other political affiliations: Home Rule League

John Gordon Swift MacNeill (11 March 1849 – 24 August 1926) was an Irish Protestant Nationalist politician and MP, in the House of Commons of the United Kingdom of Great Britain and Ireland for South Donegal from 1887 until 1918, Professor of Constitutional and Criminal Law at the King's Inns, Dublin, 1882–88, and Professor of the Law of Public and Private Wrongs at the National University of Ireland from 1909. He was also a well-known author on law and nationalist issues, and became a QC (Queen's Counsel) (later KC) in 1893.

== Life ==
MacNeill was from a Church of Ireland Conservative background. He was the only son of the Rev. John Gordon Swift MacNeill, chaplain of the Richmond Bridewell, Dublin, and of Susan, daughter of the Rev. H. Tweedy, formerly Lieutenant, 7th Dragoon Guards. The 'Swift' in his name came from his descent from Godwin Swift, uncle and guardian to Jonathan Swift (1667–1745). MacNeill was educated at Trinity College Dublin and Christ Church, Oxford, and called to the Irish Bar in 1875. He never married.

As a professor of law at the King's Inns, MacNeill taught a number of Irish political leaders when they were studying for the bar, including Tim Healy, John Redmond and Willie Redmond.

On his own account, MacNeill had been from his earliest years "enthusiastic in support of the restoration of the old Irish Parliament". He joined the Home Government Association and its successor the Home Rule League when he began studying for the bar, and was a member of the Council of these organisations. He was first elected to Parliament in a by-election at South Donegal in 1887 and sat for the same seat uninterruptedly until 1918. When the Irish Parliamentary Party split over Parnell's leadership in 1890, MacNeill sided with the Anti-Parnellites. At the general elections of 1892 and 1895 he was opposed only by a Unionist candidate, and not by the Parnellites. At the subsequent four general elections he was returned unopposed, but in 1918 he was deselected as Irish Party candidate in favour of John T. Donovan, who in turn lost the seat to Sinn Féin.

MacNeill had a formidable mastery of Parliamentary procedure and was a member of the Committee of Privileges from 1908. He devised procedural tactics which enabled the Irish Party to defeat an attempt by the Salisbury government to reduce Irish representation in the British House of Commons. It was his ambition to be the first Speaker of the Irish House of Commons which would have been established under the Government of Ireland Act 1914 had it been implemented. In parallel with his pursuit of Home Rule for Ireland, many of his efforts were devoted to improving the governance of the United Kingdom. It was his motion to disallow the votes of directors of the Mombasa railway which resulted in the defeat of the Unionist government in 1892. He claimed the credit for establishing the principle that the position of Minister of the Crown is incompatible with directorship of a public company. In 1906, after much effort, he also obtained the abolition of flogging in the Royal Navy. On 25 February 1911, he delivered the inaugural address on "Academic Education and Practical Politics" to the Legal and Economic Society of University College, Dublin.

Like the rest of the Irish Party, MacNeill supported the cause of Britain and her Allies in the First World War. His support had particularly deep roots. In 1890 he took an unpopular stance in opposing the cession to Germany of Heligoland, which became an important German naval base in the First World War. MacNeill later described this as 'one of the most important blunders in the history of the world', and claimed that 'But for it humanity could not have been scourged by the Great War'. He also campaigned successfully for the removal of titles from German members of the royal family, through the Titles Deprivation (Enemies) Act 1917.

MacNeill had some eccentricities. The Times commented 'his learning was allied to a disposition of quite an explosive kind, which, when he was on his feet, made him shout and gesticulate and twist about into many odd shapes and forms'. His memoirs, What I Have Seen and Heard (1925) in the main eschew substantive political discussion in favour of anecdotes and character sketches. They do however contain an important account of MacNeill's discussions with Cecil Rhodes in 1887–88 which led to the latter's donation of £10,000 to the Irish Party and to the election of James Rochfort Maguire to Parliament.

== Selected publications ==
- The Irish Parliament: What it was and what it did, London and New York, Cassell, 1885
- English Interference with Irish Industries, London and New York, Cassell, 1886
- How the Union was Carried, London, Kegan Paul, Trench, 1887
- Titled Corruption; the sordid origin of some Irish peerages, London, T. F. Unwin, 1894
- The Constitutional and Parliamentary History of Ireland till the Union, Dublin, Talbot Press, 1917
- Studies in the Constitution of the Irish Free State, Dublin, Talbot Press, 1925
- What I Have Seen and Heard, London, Arrowsmith, 1925

=== Other sources ===
- Irish Independent, 25 August 1926
- Patrick Maume, The Long Gestation: Irish Nationalist Life 1891–1918, Dublin, Gill & Macmillan; New York, St Martin's Press, 1999
- Oxford Dictionary of National Biography, 'J. G. Swift MacNeill (1845–1926), politician and jurist', by S. L. Gwynn, revised by Alan O'Day
- The Times, 25 August 1926
- Brian M. Walker (ed.), Parliamentary Election Results in Ireland, 1801–1922, Dublin, Royal Irish Academy, 1978
- Who Was Who 1916–1928

Parliament of the United Kingdom
Preceded by Bernard Kelly	Member of Parliament for South Donegal; 1887 – 1918	Succeeded by Peter J. Ward
