= Frank Carney (politician) =

Irish politician and soldier (1896–1932)

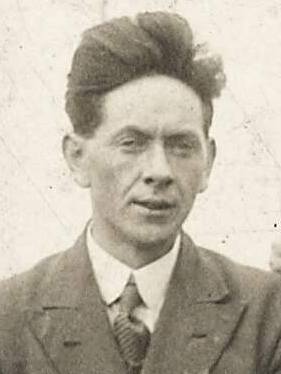
- Carney in 1927

Teachta Dála
- In office June 1927 – 19 October 1932
- Constituency: Donegal

Personal details
- Born: 25 April 1896 Enniskillen, County Fermanagh, Ireland
- Died: 19 October 1932 (aged 36) Dublin, Ireland
- Party: Independent
- Spouse: Nora Guinness (m. 1922)
- Children: 6

Military service
- Branch/service: Royal Inniskilling Fusiliers; Irish Volunteers; Irish Republican Army
- Battles/wars: Irish War of Independence

Frank Carney (25 April 1896 – 19 October 1932) was an Irish politician and soldier. He fought in the Irish War of Independence before being elected to Dáil Éireann as a Fianna Fáil Teachta Dála (TD).

He was born 25 April 1896 in Abbey Street, Enniskillen, County Fermanagh, son of Edward Carney, a fisherman, and Eliza Carney (née McCaffrey).

He joined the Royal Inniskilling Fusiliers at the outbreak of World War I in 1914, but due to continuous bouts of ill health, he was discharged from the British Army in December 1915. Carney joined the Irish Volunteers and rose rapidly to become Officer Commanding for County Fermanagh in 1918. He was also a prominent member of the Irish Republican Brotherhood, and was close to his commanding officer, Michael Collins.

In 1920, in the middle of the Irish War of Independence, Carney was appointed Officer Commanding of the 1st Northern Division of the Irish Republican Army (IRA), with the rank of Brigadier. However, just a few weeks later, the British Army were informed that Frank Carney was meeting his IRA Captains in Sweeney's Hotel in Dungloe, County Donegal. They arrested Carney and his Captains, and they were taken to Derry prison. Carney was then sent to Ballykinler Internment camp in County Down where he remained until the signing of the Truce.

A former chief supplies officer of the National Army, he won his seat in the Dáil on his first attempt, when he was elected for the Donegal constituency at the June 1927 general election. He was re-elected at the September 1927 and 1932 general elections, but died following ill-health later that year, aged 36. No by-election was held for his seat, which remained vacant until the next general election in January 1933.

== Irish Civil War ==
In her account of the opening shots of the Irish Civil War, The Fall of Dublin (Mercier, 2011), the historian Liz Gillis presents the testimony of Carney, a Free State officer stationed at Portobello Barracks during the lead up to the assault on the Four Courts: "Frank Carney, supplies officer at the barracks, was ordered to hand over weapons and other materials that were to be used in the assault: He was about to obey the order when he recognised the officer receiving them as a British officer from the Phoenix Park depot [the British Army HQ]. Realising it was an alliance with British against Republicans that he was being called upon to take action, he refused to comply and resigned. Several men resigned with him and all were placed under arrest".

After the signing of the Treaty, Carney was Chief Supplies Officer of the National Army, and he was one of the first Officers to accept the hand-over from British Forces at Beggars Bush Barracks in January 1922. In June 1922, when the Civil War began in Ireland, Carney was based in Portobello Barracks. He was commanded to hand over armaments by his commanding officer, General Eoin O'Duffy, so that these could be used to fire-bomb the entrenched anti-Treaty forces in the Four Courts building in Dublin. Carney was a senior officer in the National Army, but he refused to hand over the armaments. He held the view that he would not to be involved in any form of violence against those who had been his brothers-in-arms just a few months before. Carney and some of his fellow officers were arrested, but were freed after a short time. He was one of the few officers and veterans of the War of Independence who refused to take part in the Irish Civil War and he became a founder member of a small Neutrality Group, encouraging others not to fight.

Dáil	Election	Deputy (Party)	Deputy (Party)	Deputy (Party)	Deputy (Party)	Deputy (Party)	Deputy (Party)	Deputy (Party)	Deputy (Party)
2nd	1921	Joseph O'Doherty (SF)	Samuel O'Flaherty (SF)	Patrick McGoldrick (SF)	Joseph McGinley (SF)	Joseph Sweeney (SF)	Peter Ward (SF)	6 seats 1921–1923	
3rd	1922	Joseph O'Doherty (AT-SF)	Samuel O'Flaherty (AT-SF)	Patrick McGoldrick (PT-SF)	Joseph McGinley (PT-SF)	Joseph Sweeney (PT-SF)	Peter Ward (PT-SF)	6 seats 1921–1923	
4th	1923	Joseph O'Doherty (Rep)	Peadar O'Donnell (Rep)	Patrick McGoldrick (CnaG)	Eugene Doherty (CnaG)	Patrick McFadden (CnaG)	Peter Ward (CnaG)	James Myles (Ind.)	John White (FP)
4th	1924 by-election	Joseph O'Doherty (Rep)	Peadar O'Donnell (Rep)	Patrick McGoldrick (CnaG)	Eugene Doherty (CnaG)	Patrick McFadden (CnaG)	Denis McCullough (CnaG)	James Myles (Ind.)	John White (FP)
5th	1927 (Jun)	Frank Carney (FF)	Neal Blaney (FF)	Daniel McMenamin (NL)	Eugene Doherty (CnaG)	Michael Óg McFadden (CnaG)	Hugh Law (CnaG)	James Myles (Ind.)	John White (FP)
6th	1927 (Sep)	Frank Carney (FF)	Neal Blaney (FF)	Archie Cassidy (Lab)	Eugene Doherty (CnaG)	Michael Óg McFadden (CnaG)	Hugh Law (CnaG)	James Myles (Ind.)	John White (FP)
7th	1932	Frank Carney (FF)	Neal Blaney (FF)	Brian Brady (FF)	Eugene Doherty (CnaG)	Daniel McMenamin (CnaG)	James Dillon (Ind.)	James Myles (Ind.)	John White (CnaG)
8th	1933	Joseph O'Doherty (FF)	Neal Blaney (FF)	Brian Brady (FF)	Hugh Doherty (FF)	Daniel McMenamin (CnaG)	James Dillon (NCP)	James Myles (Ind.)	Michael Óg McFadden (CnaG)
9th	1937	Constituency abolished. See Donegal East and Donegal West							

Dáil	Election	Deputy (Party)	Deputy (Party)	Deputy (Party)	Deputy (Party)	Deputy (Party)
21st	1977	Hugh Conaghan (FF)	Joseph Brennan (FF)	Neil Blaney (IFF)	James White (FG)	Paddy Harte (FG)
21st	1980 by-election	Hugh Conaghan (FF)	Clement Coughlan (FF)	Neil Blaney (IFF)	James White (FG)	Paddy Harte (FG)
22nd	1981	Constituency abolished. See Donegal North-East and Donegal South-West				

Dáil	Election	Deputy (Party)	Deputy (Party)	Deputy (Party)	Deputy (Party)	Deputy (Party)
32nd	2016	Pearse Doherty (SF)	Pat "the Cope" Gallagher (FF)	Thomas Pringle (Ind.)	Charlie McConalogue (FF)	Joe McHugh (FG)
33rd	2020	Pearse Doherty (SF)	Pádraig Mac Lochlainn (SF)	Thomas Pringle (Ind.)	Charlie McConalogue (FF)	Joe McHugh (FG)
34th	2024	Pearse Doherty (SF)	Pádraig Mac Lochlainn (SF)	Charles Ward (100%R)	Charlie McConalogue (FF)	Pat "the Cope" Gallagher (FF)
