= 100% Redress =

Irish political party

100% Redress Cúiteamh 100%
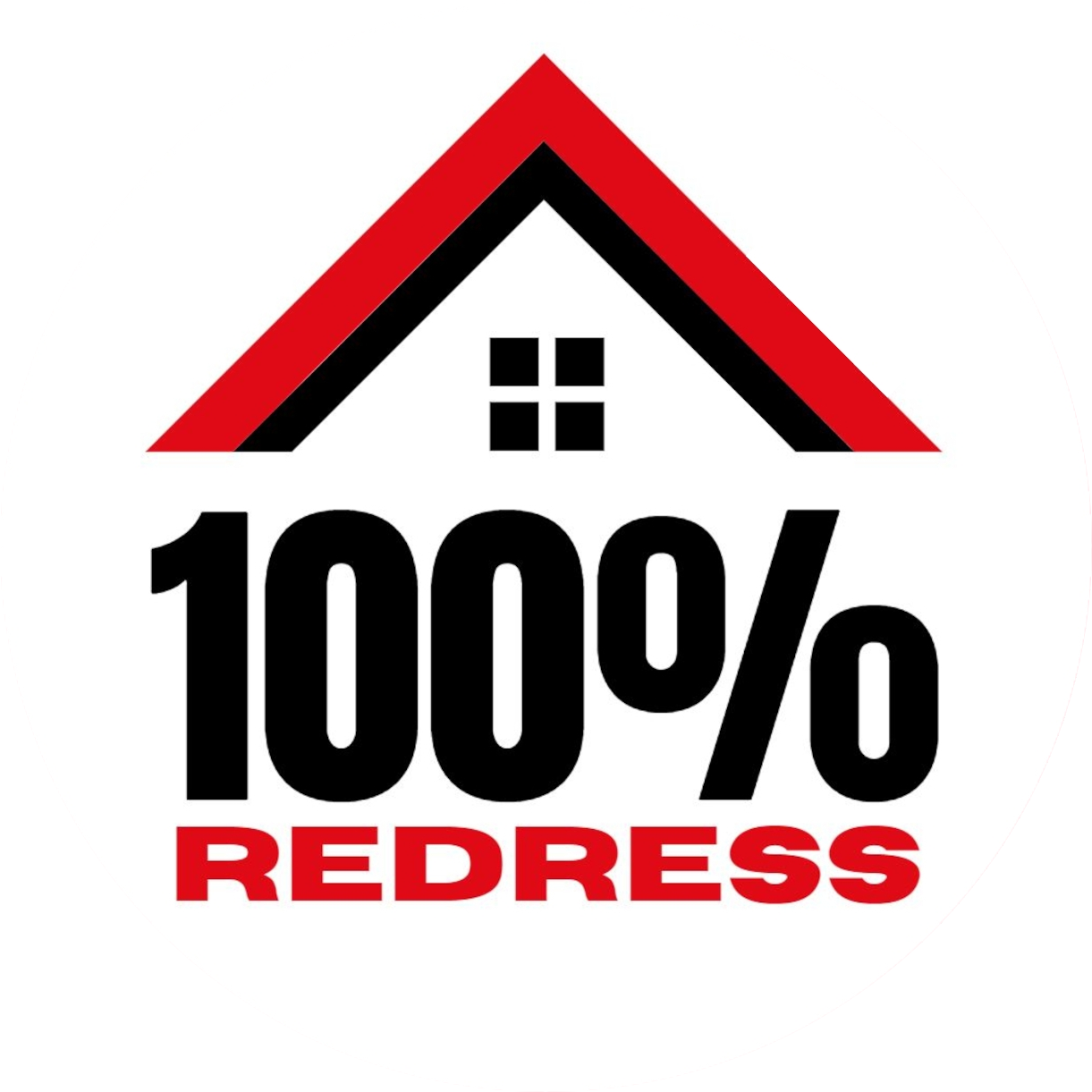
- Chairperson: Tomás Seán Devine
- Founded: 15 September 2023
- Headquarters: Buncrana, County Donegal
- Ideology: Single-issue
- Political position: Left-wing
- Dáil Éireann: 1 / 174
- Local government: 4 / 949

Website
- 100percentredressparty.ie

100% Redress (Irish: Cúiteamh 100%) is an Irish political party registered on 15 September 2023. The group was formed in County Donegal after action groups concerned with excessive mica in bricks, including the Donegal Mica Action Group, proposed to set up a political party to represent homeowners impacted by the Irish defective block crisis.

The party's main stated goal is to secure a new redress scheme for defective concrete blocks that covers 100% of the costs of rebuilding homes and buildings affected by defective materials. Despite a focus on the defective blocks issue, the group has stated that it is not a single-issue party and said that it had developed policies regarding health, housing, tourism, youth emigration and government transparency. The party, which backed Catherine Connolly in the 2025 Irish presidential election, is a member of an Oireachtas technical group that includes several independents and members of People Before Profit–Solidarity and the Green Party.

The party, which is registered to contest local and Dáil elections, won four out of the six seats they contested in the 2024 Donegal County Council election with 9.65% of the first preference vote. A party candidate, Charles Ward, contested the 2024 Irish general election. He was elected to represent the Donegal constituency with 8.96% of the first preference vote. In 2024, he joined the Independents and Smaller Parties Technical Group to obtain speaking rights in the 34th Dáil alongside PBP-Solidarity, Green and independent TDs.

== Election results ==
=== Dáil Éireann ===
Election	Leader	FPv	%	Seats	%	±	Dáil	Government
2024	Tomás Seán Devine	6,862	0.3 (12th)	1 / 174	0.6 (8th)	New	34th	Opposition; 35th government (FF-FG-Ind majority)

=== Presidential elections ===
Election	Candidate	1st pref. votes	%	+/–	Position
2025	Supported Catherine Connolly as an independent				

=== Donegal County Council elections ===
Election	1st pref. votes	%	Seats	+/–
2024	7,400	9.65 (4th)	4 / 37	▲4
