= 1887 South Donegal by-election =

UK Parliamentary by-election

The 1887 South Donegal by-election was a parliamentary by-election held for the United Kingdom House of Commons constituency of South Donegal on 2 February 1887. It arose as a result of the death of the sitting member, Bernard Kelly of the Irish Parliamentary Party, on 1 January.

The Times reported on 21 January that the seat had been offered by the Irish party leader, Charles Stewart Parnell, to the former member for County Tyrone, Thomas Alexander Dickson, but that he had refused unless he could run as an 'independent Gladstonian Liberal' and would not sign the pledge required of members of the Irish Parliamentary Party; instead, it was reported that Tim Healy, who had lost his South Londonderry seat at the last general election, was to be the candidate. On 24 January, however, it was announced that Mr Parnell had asked J. G. Swift MacNeill, Professor of Constitutional and Criminal Law at the King's Inns, Dublin, to be the candidate, saying that MacNeill's election, as a Protestant, by the Catholic electors of South Donegal would have a great effect of dispelling the fears and prejudices of Northern Protestants'.

The other nominated candidate in the by-election was Henry Monsell Munster, representing the Liberal Unionists. Munster received 933 votes; MacNeill received 4,604 and was duly declared elected. He went on to represent the constituency until 1918.

== Result ==
South Donegal by-election, 1887
Party	Candidate	Votes	%	±%
Irish Parliamentary	J. G. Swift MacNeill	4,604	83.1	+5.3
Liberal Unionist	Henry Monsell Munster	933	16.9	−5.3
Majority		3,671	66.2	+10.6
Turnout		5,537	70.7	−9.6
Irish Parliamentary hold		Swing	+5.3	
