= Eugene Doherty =

Irish politician (1862–1937)

Teachta Dála
- In office August 1923 – January 1933
- Constituency: Donegal

Personal details
- Born: 22 January 1862 County Donegal, Ireland
- Died: 1 May 1937 (aged 75)
- Party: Cumann na nGaedheal

Eugene Doherty (22 January 1862 – 1 May 1937) was an Irish Cumann na nGaedheal politician. A civil servant before entering politics, he was first elected to Dáil Éireann as a Cumann na nGaedheal Teachta Dála (TD) for the Donegal constituency at the 1923 general election.

He was re-elected at each subsequent election until he lost his seat at the 1933 general election.

Dáil	Election	Deputy (Party)	Deputy (Party)	Deputy (Party)	Deputy (Party)	Deputy (Party)	Deputy (Party)	Deputy (Party)	Deputy (Party)
2nd	1921	Joseph O'Doherty (SF)	Samuel O'Flaherty (SF)	Patrick McGoldrick (SF)	Joseph McGinley (SF)	Joseph Sweeney (SF)	Peter Ward (SF)	6 seats 1921–1923	
3rd	1922	Joseph O'Doherty (AT-SF)	Samuel O'Flaherty (AT-SF)	Patrick McGoldrick (PT-SF)	Joseph McGinley (PT-SF)	Joseph Sweeney (PT-SF)	Peter Ward (PT-SF)	6 seats 1921–1923	
4th	1923	Joseph O'Doherty (Rep)	Peadar O'Donnell (Rep)	Patrick McGoldrick (CnaG)	Eugene Doherty (CnaG)	Patrick McFadden (CnaG)	Peter Ward (CnaG)	James Myles (Ind.)	John White (FP)
4th	1924 by-election	Joseph O'Doherty (Rep)	Peadar O'Donnell (Rep)	Patrick McGoldrick (CnaG)	Eugene Doherty (CnaG)	Patrick McFadden (CnaG)	Denis McCullough (CnaG)	James Myles (Ind.)	John White (FP)
5th	1927 (Jun)	Frank Carney (FF)	Neal Blaney (FF)	Daniel McMenamin (NL)	Eugene Doherty (CnaG)	Michael Óg McFadden (CnaG)	Hugh Law (CnaG)	James Myles (Ind.)	John White (FP)
6th	1927 (Sep)	Frank Carney (FF)	Neal Blaney (FF)	Archie Cassidy (Lab)	Eugene Doherty (CnaG)	Michael Óg McFadden (CnaG)	Hugh Law (CnaG)	James Myles (Ind.)	John White (FP)
7th	1932	Frank Carney (FF)	Neal Blaney (FF)	Brian Brady (FF)	Eugene Doherty (CnaG)	Daniel McMenamin (CnaG)	James Dillon (Ind.)	James Myles (Ind.)	John White (CnaG)
8th	1933	Joseph O'Doherty (FF)	Neal Blaney (FF)	Brian Brady (FF)	Hugh Doherty (FF)	Daniel McMenamin (CnaG)	James Dillon (NCP)	James Myles (Ind.)	Michael Óg McFadden (CnaG)
9th	1937	Constituency abolished. See Donegal East and Donegal West							

Dáil	Election	Deputy (Party)	Deputy (Party)	Deputy (Party)	Deputy (Party)	Deputy (Party)
21st	1977	Hugh Conaghan (FF)	Joseph Brennan (FF)	Neil Blaney (IFF)	James White (FG)	Paddy Harte (FG)
21st	1980 by-election	Hugh Conaghan (FF)	Clement Coughlan (FF)	Neil Blaney (IFF)	James White (FG)	Paddy Harte (FG)
22nd	1981	Constituency abolished. See Donegal North-East and Donegal South-West				

Dáil	Election	Deputy (Party)	Deputy (Party)	Deputy (Party)	Deputy (Party)	Deputy (Party)
32nd	2016	Pearse Doherty (SF)	Pat "the Cope" Gallagher (FF)	Thomas Pringle (Ind.)	Charlie McConalogue (FF)	Joe McHugh (FG)
33rd	2020	Pearse Doherty (SF)	Pádraig Mac Lochlainn (SF)	Thomas Pringle (Ind.)	Charlie McConalogue (FF)	Joe McHugh (FG)
34th	2024	Pearse Doherty (SF)	Pádraig Mac Lochlainn (SF)	Charles Ward (100%R)	Charlie McConalogue (FF)	Pat "the Cope" Gallagher (FF)
