= Samuel O'Flaherty =

Irish politician (1895–1930)

Teachta Dála
- In office May 1921 – August 1923
- Constituency: Donegal

Personal details
- Born: 1895 Castlefin, County Donegal, Ireland
- Died: 22 May 1930 (aged 34–35) Stranorlar, County Donegal, Ireland
- Party: Sinn Féin
- Education: University College Dublin

Samuel O'Flaherty (1895 – 22 May 1930) was an Irish Sinn Féin politician.

He first stood for election at the 1918 general election as an unofficial Sinn Féin candidate for the East Donegal constituency. An electoral pact was brokered by Cardinal Michael Logue under which eight seats in Ulster were allocated either to the Irish Parliamentary Party or to Sinn Féin and not to be contested by the other. Edward Kelly of the Irish Parliamentary Party, the outgoing MP, was selected for East Donegal. Kelly obtained 7,596 votes to the Unionist's 4,797. O'Flaherty broke the pact and obtained a mere 46 votes.

He was elected unopposed as a Sinn Féin Teachta Dála (TD) to the Second Dáil at the 1921 elections for the Donegal constituency. He opposed the Anglo-Irish Treaty and voted against it. He was re-elected unopposed as an anti-Treaty Sinn Féin TD at the 1922 general election but did not take his seat. He lost his seat at the 1923 general election.

O'Flaherty was the son of James O'Flaherty, a farmer and mill-owner of Castlefin. His brothers were similarly involved with the Sinn Féin: John who was interned at Curragh; James, a priest and professor at Dungannon College; and Manus, a civil servant; his three sisters all belonged to Cumann na mBan. He was educated at St Columb's College, Derry and University College Dublin.

He died from Bright's disease in Stranorlar aged 35 on 22 May 1930.

Dáil	Election	Deputy (Party)	Deputy (Party)	Deputy (Party)	Deputy (Party)	Deputy (Party)	Deputy (Party)	Deputy (Party)	Deputy (Party)
2nd	1921	Joseph O'Doherty (SF)	Samuel O'Flaherty (SF)	Patrick McGoldrick (SF)	Joseph McGinley (SF)	Joseph Sweeney (SF)	Peter Ward (SF)	6 seats 1921–1923	
3rd	1922	Joseph O'Doherty (AT-SF)	Samuel O'Flaherty (AT-SF)	Patrick McGoldrick (PT-SF)	Joseph McGinley (PT-SF)	Joseph Sweeney (PT-SF)	Peter Ward (PT-SF)	6 seats 1921–1923	
4th	1923	Joseph O'Doherty (Rep)	Peadar O'Donnell (Rep)	Patrick McGoldrick (CnaG)	Eugene Doherty (CnaG)	Patrick McFadden (CnaG)	Peter Ward (CnaG)	James Myles (Ind.)	John White (FP)
4th	1924 by-election	Joseph O'Doherty (Rep)	Peadar O'Donnell (Rep)	Patrick McGoldrick (CnaG)	Eugene Doherty (CnaG)	Patrick McFadden (CnaG)	Denis McCullough (CnaG)	James Myles (Ind.)	John White (FP)
5th	1927 (Jun)	Frank Carney (FF)	Neal Blaney (FF)	Daniel McMenamin (NL)	Eugene Doherty (CnaG)	Michael Óg McFadden (CnaG)	Hugh Law (CnaG)	James Myles (Ind.)	John White (FP)
6th	1927 (Sep)	Frank Carney (FF)	Neal Blaney (FF)	Archie Cassidy (Lab)	Eugene Doherty (CnaG)	Michael Óg McFadden (CnaG)	Hugh Law (CnaG)	James Myles (Ind.)	John White (FP)
7th	1932	Frank Carney (FF)	Neal Blaney (FF)	Brian Brady (FF)	Eugene Doherty (CnaG)	Daniel McMenamin (CnaG)	James Dillon (Ind.)	James Myles (Ind.)	John White (CnaG)
8th	1933	Joseph O'Doherty (FF)	Neal Blaney (FF)	Brian Brady (FF)	Hugh Doherty (FF)	Daniel McMenamin (CnaG)	James Dillon (NCP)	James Myles (Ind.)	Michael Óg McFadden (CnaG)
9th	1937	Constituency abolished. See Donegal East and Donegal West							

Dáil	Election	Deputy (Party)	Deputy (Party)	Deputy (Party)	Deputy (Party)	Deputy (Party)
21st	1977	Hugh Conaghan (FF)	Joseph Brennan (FF)	Neil Blaney (IFF)	James White (FG)	Paddy Harte (FG)
21st	1980 by-election	Hugh Conaghan (FF)	Clement Coughlan (FF)	Neil Blaney (IFF)	James White (FG)	Paddy Harte (FG)
22nd	1981	Constituency abolished. See Donegal North-East and Donegal South-West				

Dáil	Election	Deputy (Party)	Deputy (Party)	Deputy (Party)	Deputy (Party)	Deputy (Party)
32nd	2016	Pearse Doherty (SF)	Pat "the Cope" Gallagher (FF)	Thomas Pringle (Ind.)	Charlie McConalogue (FF)	Joe McHugh (FG)
33rd	2020	Pearse Doherty (SF)	Pádraig Mac Lochlainn (SF)	Thomas Pringle (Ind.)	Charlie McConalogue (FF)	Joe McHugh (FG)
34th	2024	Pearse Doherty (SF)	Pádraig Mac Lochlainn (SF)	Charles Ward (100%R)	Charlie McConalogue (FF)	Pat "the Cope" Gallagher (FF)
