= County registrar =

Quasi-judicial role in Circuit Court of Ireland

A county registrar (Irish: Cláraitheoir an Chontae) is an officer in the Irish courts attached to the Circuit Court who carries out a number of quasi-judicial and administrative functions regarding the functioning of the court within their assigned county or counties.

The county registrar has responsibility for the administration and management of the circuit court offices in each county. These quasi-judicial functions of a county registrar in the Circuit Court are similar to those of the Master of the High Court in the High Court.

== Other roles ==
Except in Dublin and Cork, the county registrar is also the sheriff and responsible for the enforcement of court orders and acts as returning officer for all referendums and elections.

== Appointment ==
County registrars are appointed by the government on the nomination of the Appointments Advisory Board.
