= Donegal (Dáil constituency) =

Dáil constituency (1921–1937, 1977–1981, 2016–present)

- Dáil constituency
- Location of Donegal within Ireland
- Interactive map of constituency boundaries since the 2024 general election
- Major settlements: Ballybofey; Buncrana; Donegal; Killybegs; Letterkenny; Lifford; Stranorlar

Current constituency
- Created: 2016
- Seats: 5
- TDs: Pearse Doherty (SF); Pat "the Cope" Gallagher (FF); Pádraig Mac Lochlainn (SF); Charlie McConalogue (FF); Charles Ward (100%R)
- Local government area: County Donegal
- Created from: Donegal North-East; Donegal South-West
- EP constituency: Midlands–North-West

Donegal
- Former Dáil constituency

Former constituency
- Created: 1977
- Abolished: 1981
- Seats: 5
- Local government area: County Donegal
- Created from: Donegal–Leitrim; Donegal North-East
- Replaced by: Donegal North-East; Donegal South-West

Donegal
- Former Dáil constituency

Former constituency
- Created: 1921
- Abolished: 1937
- Seats: 6 (1921–1923); 8 (1923–1937)
- Local government area: County Donegal
- Created from: East Donegal; North Donegal; South Donegal; West Donegal
- Replaced by: Donegal East; Donegal West

Donegal is a parliamentary constituency which has been represented in Dáil Éireann, the lower house of the Irish parliament or Oireachtas, since the 2016 general election. The constituency elects five deputies (Teachtaí Dála, commonly known as TDs) on the system of proportional representation by means of the single transferable vote (PR-STV).

It covers County Donegal with the exception of nine southern electoral divisions which are part of the neighbouring Sligo–Leitrim constituency.

== History and boundaries ==
=== 1921 to 1937 ===
The constituency was created in 1921 by the Government of Ireland Act 1920 as a 6-seat constituency for the Southern Ireland House of Commons and a two-seat constituency for the United Kingdom House of Commons at Westminster, taking in the whole of County Donegal in north-west Ireland, succeeding the former Westminster constituencies of East Donegal, North Donegal, South Donegal and West Donegal. At the 1921 election for the Southern Ireland House of Commons, the six seats were won uncontested by Sinn Féin, who treated it as part of the election to the Second Dáil. It was never used as a Westminster constituency; under s. 1(4) of the Irish Free State (Agreement) Act 1922, no writ was to be issued "for a constituency in Ireland other than a constituency in Northern Ireland". Therefore, no vote was held in County Dublin at the 1922 United Kingdom general election on 15 November 1922, shortly before the Irish Free State left the United Kingdom on 6 December 1922.

Under the Electoral Act 1923, the constituency's boundaries remained unchanged, and were defined as "the administrative county of Donegal". However, its representation was increased from 6 to 8 seats. It was abolished by the Electoral (Revision of Constituencies) Act 1935, with effect from the 1937 general election. It was replaced by two new constituencies: the 4-seat Donegal East and the 3-seat Donegal West.

=== 1977 to 1981 ===
A Donegal constituency was re-established as a 5-seat constituency under the Electoral (Amendment) Act 1974, and used at the 1977 general election only. The revived constituency was short-lived, as under the Electoral (Amendment) Act 1980, it was replaced by two new 3-seat constituencies, Donegal North-East and Donegal South-West.

=== Since 2016 ===
In 2012 the Constituency Commission proposed that at the next general election, the constituencies of Donegal North-East and Donegal South-West should be replaced by a new constituency called Donegal. The report proposed changes to the constituencies of Ireland so as to reduce the total number of TDs from 166 to 158. The Donegal constituency was re-established by the Electoral (Amendment) (Dáil Constituencies) Act 2013, with effect from the 2016 general election.

The Electoral (Amendment) (Dáil Constituencies) Act 2017 defines the constituency as:

"The county of Donegal, except the part thereof which is comprised in the constituency of Sligo–Leitrim."

The area of the county of Donegal within the Sligo–Leitrim constituency is:

"the electoral divisions of:

Ballintra, Ballyshannon Rural, Ballyshannon Urban, Bundoran Rural, Carrickboy, Cavangarden, Cliff, in the former Rural District of Ballyshannon;
Ballintra in the former Rural District of Donegal;
and Bundoran Urban"

The Constituency Review Report 2023 of the Electoral Commission recommended that no change be made at the next general election.

== TDs ==
=== TDs 1921–1937 ===
Teachtaí Dála (TDs) for Donegal 1921–1937
Key to parties: CnaG = Cumann na nGaedheal; FF = Fianna Fáil; FG = Fine Gael; FP = Farmers' Party; Ind = Independent; Lab = Labour; NL = National League; NCP = National Centre Party; Rep = Republican; SF = Sinn Féin; AT-SF = Sinn Féin (Anti-Treaty); PT-SF = Sinn Féin (Pro-Treaty)
Dáil	Election	Deputy (Party)	Deputy (Party)	Deputy (Party)	Deputy (Party)	Deputy (Party)	Deputy (Party)	Deputy (Party)	Deputy (Party)
2nd	1921	Joseph O'Doherty (SF)	Samuel O'Flaherty (SF)	Patrick McGoldrick (SF)	Joseph McGinley (SF)	Joseph Sweeney (SF)	Peter Ward (SF)	6 seats 1921–1923	
3rd	1922	Joseph O'Doherty (AT-SF)	Samuel O'Flaherty (AT-SF)	Patrick McGoldrick (PT-SF)	Joseph McGinley (PT-SF)	Joseph Sweeney (PT-SF)	Peter Ward (PT-SF)	6 seats 1921–1923	
4th	1923	Joseph O'Doherty (Rep)	Peadar O'Donnell (Rep)	Patrick McGoldrick (CnaG)	Eugene Doherty (CnaG)	Patrick McFadden (CnaG)	Peter Ward (CnaG)	James Myles (Ind.)	John White (FP)
4th	1924 by-election	Joseph O'Doherty (Rep)	Peadar O'Donnell (Rep)	Patrick McGoldrick (CnaG)	Eugene Doherty (CnaG)	Patrick McFadden (CnaG)	Denis McCullough (CnaG)	James Myles (Ind.)	John White (FP)
5th	1927 (Jun)	Frank Carney (FF)	Neal Blaney (FF)	Daniel McMenamin (NL)	Eugene Doherty (CnaG)	Michael Óg McFadden (CnaG)	Hugh Law (CnaG)	James Myles (Ind.)	John White (FP)
6th	1927 (Sep)	Frank Carney (FF)	Neal Blaney (FF)	Archie Cassidy (Lab)	Eugene Doherty (CnaG)	Michael Óg McFadden (CnaG)	Hugh Law (CnaG)	James Myles (Ind.)	John White (FP)
7th	1932	Frank Carney (FF)	Neal Blaney (FF)	Brian Brady (FF)	Eugene Doherty (CnaG)	Daniel McMenamin (CnaG)	James Dillon (Ind.)	James Myles (Ind.)	John White (CnaG)
8th	1933	Joseph O'Doherty (FF)	Neal Blaney (FF)	Brian Brady (FF)	Hugh Doherty (FF)	Daniel McMenamin (CnaG)	James Dillon (NCP)	James Myles (Ind.)	Michael Óg McFadden (CnaG)
9th	1937	Constituency abolished. See Donegal East and Donegal West							

Note: The columns in this table are used only for presentational purposes, and no significance should be attached to the order of columns. For details of the order in which seats were won at each election, see the detailed results of that election.

=== TDs 1977–1981 ===
Teachtaí Dála (TDs) for Donegal 1977–1981
Key to parties: FF = Fianna Fáil; FG = Fine Gael; IFF = Independent Fianna Fáil
Dáil	Election	Deputy (Party)	Deputy (Party)	Deputy (Party)	Deputy (Party)	Deputy (Party)
21st	1977	Hugh Conaghan (FF)	Joseph Brennan (FF)	Neil Blaney (IFF)	James White (FG)	Paddy Harte (FG)
21st	1980 by-election	Hugh Conaghan (FF)	Clement Coughlan (FF)	Neil Blaney (IFF)	James White (FG)	Paddy Harte (FG)
22nd	1981	Constituency abolished. See Donegal North-East and Donegal South-West				

Note: The columns in this table are used only for presentational purposes, and no significance should be attached to the order of columns. For details of the order in which seats were won at each election, see the detailed results of that election.

=== TDs since 2016 ===
Teachtaí Dála (TDs) for Donegal 2016–
Key to parties: 100%R = 100% Redress; FF = Fianna Fáil; FG = Fine Gael; Ind = Independent; SF = Sinn Féin
Dáil	Election	Deputy (Party)	Deputy (Party)	Deputy (Party)	Deputy (Party)	Deputy (Party)
32nd	2016	Pearse Doherty (SF)	Pat "the Cope" Gallagher (FF)	Thomas Pringle (Ind.)	Charlie McConalogue (FF)	Joe McHugh (FG)
33rd	2020	Pearse Doherty (SF)	Pádraig Mac Lochlainn (SF)	Thomas Pringle (Ind.)	Charlie McConalogue (FF)	Joe McHugh (FG)
34th	2024	Pearse Doherty (SF)	Pádraig Mac Lochlainn (SF)	Charles Ward (100%R)	Charlie McConalogue (FF)	Pat "the Cope" Gallagher (FF)

Note: The columns in this table are used only for presentational purposes, and no significance should be attached to the order of columns. For details of the order in which seats were won at each election, see the detailed results of that election.

== Elections ==
*: Outgoing TD

=== 2024 general election ===
2024 general election: Donegal
Party	Candidate	FPv%	Count															
Party	Candidate	FPv%	1	2	3	4	5	6	7	8	9	10	11	12	13	14	15	16
Sinn Féin	Pearse Doherty	24.7	18,898															
Fianna Fáil	Pat "the Cope" Gallagher	13.1	10,024	10,504	10,517	10,528	10,604	10,636	10,667	10,675	10,680	10,798	10,922	11,294	11,751	12,310	13,660	
Sinn Féin	Pádraig Mac Lochlainn	12.8	9,799	13,095														
Fianna Fáil	Charlie McConalogue	10.5	8,019	8,127	8,137	8,149	8,233	8,261	8,310	8,315	8,338	8,470	8,531	8,771	9,029	9,172	11,019	11,683
100% Redress	Charles Ward	9.0	6,862	7,236	7,268	7,283	7,300	7,378	7,469	7,522	7,632	7,868	8,466	9,784	9,909	10,855	11,629	11,714
Independent	Thomas Pringle	6.9	5,289	5,664	5,691	5,693	5,708	5,740	5,776	5,798	5,825	6,179	6,457	6,795	7,366	9,513	10,255	10,395
Fine Gael	Nikki Bradley	4.8	3,658	3,719	3,722	3,729	3,761	3,782	3,818	3,823	3,830	4,080	4,134	4,280	6,001	6,176		
Sinn Féin	Noel Jordan	4.3	3,321	4,405	4,620	4,623	4,638	4,673	4,695	4,709	4,733	5,013	5,155	5,339	5,513			
Fine Gael	John McNulty	4.2	3,247	3,276	3,277	3,283	3,293	3,293	3,297	3,302	3,306	3,349	3,379	3,434				
Aontú	Mary T. Sweeney	3.2	2,469	2,530	2,534	2,550	2,561	2,589	2,637	2,685	2,808	2,883	3,376					
Independent	Niall McConnell	2.0	1,565	1,661	1,667	1,705	1,708	1,728	1,751	1,910	2,156	2,185						
Green	Nuala Carr	1.1	880	903	904	905	913	917	930	930	931							
PBP–Solidarity	Carol Gallagher (Note: Gallagher is a member of People Before Profit.)	0.8	606	669	674	684	688	691	692	699	707							
The Irish People	Kim McMenamin	0.7	531	542	544	545	547	550	554	621								
Irish Freedom	Eamon McGee	0.5	383	399	400	408	409	417	422									
Independent	Gerry McKeever	0.4	342	354	355	359	359	378										
Independent	Frank O'Donnell	0.4	313	328	330	336	337											
Fianna Fáil	Claudia Kennedy	0.4	273	290	291	292												
Independent	Vincent J. Bradley	0.1	111	116	116													
Independent	Arthur McGuinness	0.1	34	35	35													
Electorate: 131,306 Valid: 76,624 Spoilt: 697 Quota: 12,771 Turnout: 58.9%

=== 2020 general election ===
2020 general election: Donegal
Party	Candidate	FPv%	Count								
Party	Candidate	FPv%	1	2	3	4	5	6	7	8	9
Sinn Féin	Pearse Doherty	27.2	21,044								
Sinn Féin	Pádraig Mac Lochlainn	17.9	13,891								
Fianna Fáil	Charlie McConalogue	10.8	8,347	8,871	9,022	9,078	9,425	9,633	10,054	10,270	11,432
Fine Gael	Joe McHugh	9.8	7,621	8,093	8,129	8,170	8,309	8,740	8,988	10,920	12,104
Fianna Fáil	Pat "the Cope" Gallagher	9.6	7,469	8,661	8,688	8,729	8,905	9,035	9,518	10,146	11,074
Independent	Thomas Pringle	7.1	5,472	8,270	8,521	8,621	8,947	9,637	10,241	10,755	12,245
Independent	John O'Donnell	6.1	4,735	5,620	5,780	5,891	6,168	6,294	6,956	7,106	
Fine Gael	Martin Harley	3.9	3,056	3,491	3,502	3,526	3,650	3,771	3,896		
Aontú	Mary T. Sweeney	3.1	2,382	2,827	2,907	3,128	3,349	3,600			
Green	Michael White	2.1	1,656	2,113	2,194	2,220	2,339				
Independent	Peter Casey	1.5	1,143	1,804	1,950	2,132					
Independent	Niall McConnell	0.7	580	803	832						
Independent	Arthur McGuinness	0.1	56	99	109						
Electorate: 125,911 Valid: 77,452 Spoilt: 647 Quota: 12,909 Turnout: 78,099 (62.0%)

=== 2016 general election ===
2016 general election: Donegal
Party	Candidate	FPv%	Count												
Party	Candidate	FPv%	1	2	3	4	5	6	7	8	9	10	11	12	13
Fianna Fáil	Charlie McConalogue	17.1	12,533												
Sinn Féin	Pearse Doherty	14.1	10,300	10,305	10,330	10,524	10,870	11,053	11,190	14,600					
Fianna Fáil	Pat "the Cope" Gallagher	13.9	10,198	10,203	10,362	10,504	10,694	10,941	11,160	11,267	11,398	11,832	13,138		
Fine Gael	Joe McHugh	11.5	8,412	8,414	8,443	8,704	8,795	8,965	11,016	11,040	11,061	11,784	12,469		
Independent	Thomas Pringle	8.5	6,220	6,239	6,247	6,498	6,689	7,389	7,522	7,617	7,722	8,491	9,462	9,888	10,082
Sinn Féin	Pádraig Mac Lochlainn	7.8	5,742	5,743	5,773	5,893	5,961	6,008	6,032	6,567	8,509	9,143	9,716	9,852	9,898
Sinn Féin	Gary Doherty	5.6	4,136	4,138	4,142	4,183	4,377	4,420	4,456						
Independent	Dessie Shiels	5.1	3,724	3,724	3,739	3,986	4,166	4,288	4,463	4,497	4,540				
Independent	Tim Jackson	4.9	3,580	3,585	3,601	3,752	4,034	4,319	4,524	4,650	4,790	5,864			
Fine Gael	Paddy Harte Jnr	3.9	2,831	2,832	2,838	2,934	3,133	3,244							
Independent	Frank McBrearty Jnr	2.6	1,914	1,917	1,921	1,981									
Independent Alliance	Niamh Kennedy	2.5	1,836	1,842	1,848	1,983	2,057								
Independent	Ian McGarvey	1.3	982	982	989										
Green	Paula Flanagan	0.6	428	442	443										
Independent	Michael Mooney	0.5	397	402	407										
Fís Nua	Cordelia Nic Fhearraigh	0.1	70												
Electorate: 117,675 Valid: 73,303 Spoilt: 654 Quota: 12,218 Turnout: 73,957 (62.9%)

=== 1980 by-election ===
Joseph Brennan died in office as Ceann Comhairle on 13 July 1980. The by-election was held on 6 November 1980 and was won by the Fianna Fáil candidate Clement Coughlan.

1980 by-election: Donegal
Party	Candidate	FPv%	Count		
Party	Candidate	FPv%	1	2	3
Fianna Fáil	Clement Coughlan	39.0	23,456	24,000	29,219
Fine Gael	Dinny McGinley	33.3	20,022	20,793	24,085
Independent Fianna Fáil	Paddy Kelly	23.6	14,198	14,992	
Sinn Féin The Workers' Party	Séamus Rodgers	4.0	2,401		
Electorate: 81,340 Valid: 60,077 Quota: 30,039 Turnout: 73.9%

=== 1977 general election ===
1977 general election: Donegal
Party	Candidate	FPv%	Count								
Party	Candidate	FPv%	1	2	3	4	5	6	7	8	9
Fine Gael	James White	17.6	10,672								
Independent Fianna Fáil	Neil Blaney	17.3	10,499								
Fine Gael	Paddy Harte	13.9	8,483	8,554	8,990	9,001	9,412	11,900			
Fianna Fáil	Joseph Brennan	10.6	6,448	6,465	6,477	6,502	6,701	6,714	6,788	6,935	8,499
Fianna Fáil	Bernard McGlinchey	9.4	5,693	5,715	5,724	5,789	5,892	5,941	5,984	6,260	7,309
Fianna Fáil	Hugh Conaghan	8.9	5,413	5,423	5,425	5,435	5,474	5,609	5,690	6,340	7,597
Fianna Fáil	Patrick Delap	7.5	4,583	4,597	4,605	4,614	5,150	5,170	5,195	5,474	
Independent Fianna Fáil	Paddy Keaveney	5.5	3,325	3,353	3,362	3,645	4,110	4,283	4,460		
Fine Gael	Séamus Gill	4.8	2,946	2,959	2,996	2,998	3,057				
Sinn Féin The Workers' Party	Séamus Rodgers	4.1	2,505	2,548	2,569	2,575					
Independent	Charles Long	0.4	256								
Electorate: 77,813 Valid: 60,823 Quota: 10,138 Turnout: 78.2%

=== 1933 general election ===
1933 general election: Donegal
Party	Candidate	FPv%	Count							
Party	Candidate	FPv%	1	2	3	4	5	6	7	8
Independent	James Myles	15.5	10,784							
Fianna Fáil	Brian Brady	10.9	7,615	7,616	7,632	7,633	7,640	7,643	7,651	10,298
Fianna Fáil	Joseph O'Doherty	10.6	7,384	7,389	7,435	7,436	7,512	7,619	7,633	8,555
Fianna Fáil	Neal Blaney	10.5	7,310	7,317	7,350	7,350	7,371	7,380	7,393	8,764
Fianna Fáil	Hugh Doherty	10.1	7,055	7,068	7,243	7,245	7,280	7,474	7,485	8,469
Fianna Fáil	Archie Cassidy	8.7	6,036	6,045	6,109	6,110	6,124	6,147	6,157	
National Centre Party	James Dillon	7.6	5,319	5,484	5,976	5,998	6,348	8,753		
Cumann na nGaedheal	Daniel McMenamin	7.6	5,261	5,910	6,375	6,484	11,410			
Cumann na nGaedheal	Michael Óg McFadden	6.8	4,725	5,941	8,316					
Cumann na nGaedheal	Michael McGilligan	6.2	4,306	4,992	5,303	5,752				
Cumann na nGaedheal	Eugene Doherty	5.4	3,779	4,081						
Electorate: 88,666 Valid: 69,574 Quota: 7,731 Turnout: 78.5%

=== 1932 general election ===
1932 general election: Donegal
Party	Candidate	FPv%	Count											
Party	Candidate	FPv%	1	2	3	4	5	6	7	8	9	10	11	12
Independent	James Myles	15.5	10,077											
Independent	James Dillon	11.8	7,645											
Fianna Fáil	Neal Blaney	11.4	7,416											
Fianna Fáil	Brian Brady	7.6	4,955	4,970	5,001	5,149	5,179	5,563	5,582	6,138	6,388	6,409	6,436	8,482
Fianna Fáil	Hugh Doherty	7.2	4,691	4,702	4,719	4,728	4,762	5,006	5,068	5,904	5,958	6,014	6,024	
Cumann na nGaedheal	John White	7.2	4,654	5,870	5,892	5,892	5,970	6,111	6,572	6,676	7,221			
Cumann na nGaedheal	Eugene Doherty	6.7	4,313	4,549	4,640	4,642	4,679	5,082	5,911	5,978	7,116	8,121		
Cumann na nGaedheal	Daniel McMenamin	6.2	4,050	4,425	4,464	4,467	4,531	4,801	5,495	5,521	8,300			
Fianna Fáil	Frank Carney	6.0	3,874	3,888	3,915	3,950	3,984	4,621	4,641	6,245	6,295	6,311	6,323	9,139
Cumann na nGaedheal	Michael Óg McFadden	5.8	3,737	4,144	4,187	4,188	4,232	4,353	5,384	5,455				
Fianna Fáil	Patrick Doherty	5.2	3,370	3,383	3,392	3,395	3,432	3,559	3,596					
Cumann na nGaedheal	Hugh Law	4.3	2,795	3,249	3,280	3,282	3,304	3,428						
Labour	Archie Cassidy	3.9	2,506	2,610	2,732	2,742	3,107							
Labour	Charles Sweeney	1.1	733	763	774	775								
Electorate: 87,413 Valid: 64,816 Quota: 7,202 Turnout: 74.2%

Fianna Fáil TD Frank Carney died on 19 October 1932. The seat remained vacant until the dissolution of the 7th Dáil on 2 January 1933.

=== September 1927 general election ===
September 1927 general election: Donegal
Party	Candidate	FPv%	Count									
Party	Candidate	FPv%	1	2	3	4	5	6	7	8	9	10
Independent	James Myles	14.5	7,934									
Fianna Fáil	Neal Blaney	12.6	6,877									
Cumann na nGaedheal	Eugene Doherty	11.2	6,108									
Cumann na nGaedheal	Hugh Law	9.6	5,224	5,647	5,657	5,679	5,690	5,703	6,877			
Fianna Fáil	Frank Carney	8.8	4,811	4,824	5,503	5,503	5,526	6,392				
Cumann na nGaedheal	Michael Óg McFadden	8.7	4,740	4,883	4,885	4,891	4,915	4,949	5,455	6,001	6,004	6,107
Farmers' Party	John White	8.5	4,627	5,520	5,527	5,528	5,537	5,579	5,685	5,751	5,753	5,807
Cumann na nGaedheal	Patrick McGoldrick	7.1	3,889	3,944	3,948	3,949	3,961	4,035	4,249	4,374	4,375	4,425
Labour	Archie Cassidy	6.7	3,675	3,756	3,810	3,812	3,832	4,037	4,201	4,229	4,309	6,527
Fianna Fáil	Patrick McGinley	4.5	2,463	2,480	2,512	2,512	2,530	3,165	3,193	3,243	3,487	
Cumann na nGaedheal	Edward Kelly	3.8	2,067	2,291	2,298	2,312	2,325	2,348				
Fianna Fáil	John O'Flaherty	3.6	1,973	1,987	2,004	2,004	2,016					
Independent	Kate McCarry	0.3	164	173	176	176						
Electorate: 90,224 Valid: 54,552 Quota: 6,062 Turnout: 60.5%

=== June 1927 general election ===
June 1927 general election: Donegal
Party	Candidate	FPv%	Count										
Party	Candidate	FPv%	1	2	3	4	5	6	7	8	9	10	11
Independent	James Myles	14.6	7,557										
National League	Daniel McMenamin	11.3	5,828										
Fianna Fáil	Neal Blaney	11.0	5,681	5,693	5,696	5,700	6,533						
Farmers' Party	John White	9.7	5,031	5,903									
Cumann na nGaedheal	Eugene Doherty	7.8	4,005	4,354	4,412	4,417	4,458	4,459	4,625	4,683	4,730	4,812	5,427
Cumann na nGaedheal	Hugh Law	7.0	3,596	3,791	3,839	3,857	3,932	3,934	4,584	4,699	4,735	4,750	5,220
Cumann na nGaedheal	Michael Óg McFadden	6.0	3,105	3,220	3,231	3,244	3,268	3,269	3,628	3,694	3,736	3,745	4,941
Fianna Fáil	Frank Carney	5.8	3,002	3,012	3,012	3,013	3,258	3,872	3,885	3,963	6,664		
Fianna Fáil	Seamus Monaghan	5.6	2,899	2,902	2,903	2,904	3,083	3,217	3,226	3,285			
Cumann na nGaedheal	Patrick McGoldrick	5.3	2,750	2,795	2,812	2,819	2,845	2,847	3,272	3,318	3,335	3,341	
Labour	Archie Cassidy	4.8	2,491	2,559	2,564	2,573	2,650	2,676	2,719	4,264	4,365	4,524	4,761
Labour	Denis Houston	3.9	2,005	2,086	2,096	2,120	2,205	2,212	2,303				
Cumann na nGaedheal	Patrick McFadden	3.8	1,975	2,023	2,029	2,035	2,050	2,053					
Fianna Fáil	Joseph O'Doherty	3.3	1,714	1,735	1,741	1,743							
Electorate: 90,224 Valid: 51,639 Quota: 5,738 Turnout: 57.2%

=== 1924 by-election ===
Cumann na nGaedheal TD Peter J. Ward resigned on 1 August 1924. The by-election was held on 20 November 1924 and was won by the Cumann na nGaedheal candidate Denis McCullough.

1924 by-election: Donegal
Party	Candidate	FPv%	Count
Party	Candidate	FPv%	1
Cumann na nGaedheal	Denis McCullough	57.6	24,919
Republican	Thomas Daly	42.4	18,371
Electorate: 96,777 Valid: 43,290 Quota: 21,646 Turnout: 44.7%

=== 1923 general election ===
The 1923 general election to the 4th Dáil was the first in the Donegal constituency where the number of candidates exceeded the number of seats. Under the Electoral Act 1923, Donegal's representation had been increased from six to eight seats, and these were contested by no less than 19 candidates.

1923 general election: Donegal
Party	Candidate	FPv%	Count															
Party	Candidate	FPv%	1	2	3	4	5	6	7	8	9	10	11	12	13	14	15	16
Independent	James Myles	13.2	6,954															
Cumann na nGaedheal	Peter J. Ward	10.5	5,513	5,544	5,667	5,676	5,829	5,848	6,048									
Cumann na nGaedheal	Eugene Doherty	10.0	5,261	5,271	5,316	5,333	5,385	5,412	5,635	5,670	6,409							
Cumann na nGaedheal	Patrick McGoldrick	7.1	3,743	3,754	3,809	3,816	3,874	3,910	3,955	3,982	4,263	4,597	4,624	4,689	5,330	5,683	5,853	5,942
Republican	Brian Monaghan	7.0	3,678	3,683	3,696	3,819	3,838	3,841	3,899	3,899	3,909	3,910	4,112	4,124	4,218	4,251	4,262	4,263
Farmers' Party	John White	7.0	3,673	3,743	3,751	3,753	3,767	4,225	4,263	4,276	4,287	4,293	4,317	5,210	5,351	6,664		
Republican	Peadar O'Donnell	6.9	3,621	3,627	3,643	3,778	3,796	3,808	3,865	3,867	3,882	3,882	4,867	4,878	5,120	5,205	5,234	5,234
Cumann na nGaedheal	Patrick McFadden	6.6	3,492	3,500	3,521	3,531	3,587	3,604	3,737	3,761	4,017	4,200	4,222	4,311	4,888	5,747	5,980	
Republican	Joseph O'Doherty	6.1	3,213	3,216	3,225	3,407	3,420	3,452	3,477	3,480	3,545	3,551	4,055	4,076	4,324	4,385	4,416	4,418
Labour	Denis Houston	4.7	2,456	2,476	2,630	2,678	2,818	2,892	2,965	2,972	3,001	3,006	3,080	3,136				
Farmers' Party	Hugh Law	3.3	1,718	1,762	1,771	1,780	1,949	2,278	2,634	2,665	2,769	2,779	2,787	3,254	3,600			
Republican	Samuel O'Flaherty	3.1	1,647	1,651	1,678	1,950	1,963	1,976	1,981	1,982	1,992	1,993						
Cumann na nGaedheal	Hugh J. O'Kelly	2.8	1,489	1,498	1,521	1,550	1,574	1,656	1,696	1,707								
Ratepayers	Michael McNelis	2.7	1,432	1,449	1,457	1,462	1,609	1,617										
Farmers' Party	Neil Faulkner	2.3	1,209	1,215	1,239	1,252	1,267											
Farmers' Party	Andrew Lowry	2.1	1,127	1,960	1,968	1,976	1,995	2,081	2,130	2,134	2,182	2,186	2,209					
Independent	Daniel McMenamin	1.8	927	939	990	1,000												
Republican	Edward Gallen	1.7	908	910	920													
Independent	Henry McGowan	1.3	669	673														
Electorate: 96,977 Valid: 52,730 Quota: 5,859 Turnout: 54.4%

=== 1922 general election ===
As at the 1921 general election, Sinn Féin stood one candidate for every seat (except for two Dublin constituencies); the Treaty had divided the party between 65 pro-treaty candidates, 57 anti-treaty and 1 nominally on both sides. Unlike the elections a year earlier, other parties stood in most constituencies forcing single transferable vote elections, with Sinn Féin losing 30 seats.

In Donegal, Sinn Féin's six outgoing TDs from the Second Dáil were elected unopposed, Socialist Republican, Jack White having withdrawn his candidacy. Two had opposed the treaty, and four supported it; they are listed here in alphabetical order

1922 general election: Donegal (uncontested)
Party	Candidate
Sinn Féin (Pro-Treaty)	Joseph McGinley
Sinn Féin (Pro-Treaty)	Patrick McGoldrick
Sinn Féin (Anti-Treaty)	Joseph O'Doherty
Sinn Féin (Anti-Treaty)	Samuel O'Flaherty
Sinn Féin (Pro-Treaty)	Joseph Sweeney
Sinn Féin (Pro-Treaty)	Peter J. Ward
Electorate: 76,280

=== 1921 general election ===
At the 1921 general election to the Second Dáil, no seats were contested in the 26 counties which became the Irish Free State. In Donegal, six Sinn Féin candidates were nominated for the constituency's six seats. Major Robert L Moore, who had contested East Donegal in 1918, was selected as the Unionist candidate by 22 April 1921 but was described on 15 May 1921 as 'having at the last moment withdrawn'. No ballot was needed, and all six candidates were elected unopposed after the close of nominations on 24 May 1921. The 6 TDs elected are listed here in alphabetical order:

1921 general election: Donegal (uncontested)
Party	Candidate
Sinn Féin	Joseph McGinley
Sinn Féin	Patrick McGoldrick
Sinn Féin	Joseph O'Doherty
Sinn Féin	Samuel O'Flaherty
Sinn Féin	Joseph Sweeney
Sinn Féin	Peter J. Ward

== See also ==
- Dáil constituencies
- Elections in the Republic of Ireland
- Politics of the Republic of Ireland
- List of Dáil by-elections
- List of political parties in the Republic of Ireland
