= Patrick McFadden =

Irish politician

Teachta Dála
- In office August 1923 – June 1927
- Constituency: Donegal

Personal details
- Party: Cumann na nGaedheal

Patrick McFadden was an Irish Cumann na nGaedheal politician. He was elected as a Teachta Dála (TD) for Donegal at the 1923 general election. He lost his seat at the June 1927 general election.

| Dáil | Election | Deputy (Party) | Deputy (Party) | Deputy (Party) | Deputy (Party) | Deputy (Party) | Deputy (Party) | Deputy (Party) | Deputy (Party) |
|---|---|---|---|---|---|---|---|---|---|
| 2nd | 1921 | Joseph O'Doherty (SF) | Samuel O'Flaherty (SF) | Patrick McGoldrick (SF) | Joseph McGinley (SF) | Joseph Sweeney (SF) | Peter Ward (SF) | 6 seats 1921–1923 | |
| 3rd | 1922 | Joseph O'Doherty (AT-SF) | Samuel O'Flaherty (AT-SF) | Patrick McGoldrick (PT-SF) | Joseph McGinley (PT-SF) | Joseph Sweeney (PT-SF) | Peter Ward (PT-SF) | 6 seats 1921–1923 | |
| 4th | 1923 | Joseph O'Doherty (Rep) | Peadar O'Donnell (Rep) | Patrick McGoldrick (CnaG) | Eugene Doherty (CnaG) | Patrick McFadden (CnaG) | Peter Ward (CnaG) | James Myles (Ind.) | John White (FP) |
| 4th | 1924 by-election | Joseph O'Doherty (Rep) | Peadar O'Donnell (Rep) | Patrick McGoldrick (CnaG) | Eugene Doherty (CnaG) | Patrick McFadden (CnaG) | Denis McCullough (CnaG) | James Myles (Ind.) | John White (FP) |
| 5th | 1927 (Jun) | Frank Carney (FF) | Neal Blaney (FF) | Daniel McMenamin (NL) | Eugene Doherty (CnaG) | Michael Óg McFadden (CnaG) | Hugh Law (CnaG) | James Myles (Ind.) | John White (FP) |
| 6th | 1927 (Sep) | Frank Carney (FF) | Neal Blaney (FF) | Archie Cassidy (Lab) | Eugene Doherty (CnaG) | Michael Óg McFadden (CnaG) | Hugh Law (CnaG) | James Myles (Ind.) | John White (FP) |
| 7th | 1932 | Frank Carney (FF) | Neal Blaney (FF) | Brian Brady (FF) | Eugene Doherty (CnaG) | Daniel McMenamin (CnaG) | James Dillon (Ind.) | James Myles (Ind.) | John White (CnaG) |
| 8th | 1933 | Joseph O'Doherty (FF) | Neal Blaney (FF) | Brian Brady (FF) | Hugh Doherty (FF) | Daniel McMenamin (CnaG) | James Dillon (NCP) | James Myles (Ind.) | Michael Óg McFadden (CnaG) |
| 9th | 1937 | Constituency abolished. See Donegal East and Donegal West | | | | | | | |

| Dáil | Election | Deputy (Party) | Deputy (Party) | Deputy (Party) | Deputy (Party) | Deputy (Party) |
|---|---|---|---|---|---|---|
| 21st | 1977 | Hugh Conaghan (FF) | Joseph Brennan (FF) | Neil Blaney (IFF) | James White (FG) | Paddy Harte (FG) |
| 21st | 1980 by-election | Hugh Conaghan (FF) | Clement Coughlan (FF) | Neil Blaney (IFF) | James White (FG) | Paddy Harte (FG) |
| 22nd | 1981 | Constituency abolished. See Donegal North-East and Donegal South-West | | | | |

| Dáil | Election | Deputy (Party) | Deputy (Party) | Deputy (Party) | Deputy (Party) | Deputy (Party) |
|---|---|---|---|---|---|---|
| 32nd | 2016 | Pearse Doherty (SF) | Pat "the Cope" Gallagher (FF) | Thomas Pringle (Ind.) | Charlie McConalogue (FF) | Joe McHugh (FG) |
| 33rd | 2020 | Pearse Doherty (SF) | Pádraig Mac Lochlainn (SF) | Thomas Pringle (Ind.) | Charlie McConalogue (FF) | Joe McHugh (FG) |
| 34th | 2024 | Pearse Doherty (SF) | Pádraig Mac Lochlainn (SF) | Charles Ward (100%R) | Charlie McConalogue (FF) | Pat "the Cope" Gallagher (FF) |
